= 1918 Big Ten Conference football season =

- Sport: Football
- Number of teams: 10
- Co-champions: Illinois, Michigan, Purdue

Football seasons
- ← 1917 1919 →

1918 Big Ten Conference football standings
	Conf.					Overall
Team	W		L		T	W		L		T
Michigan +	2	–	0	–	0	5	–	0	–	0
Illinois +	4	–	0	–	0	5	–	2	–	0
Purdue +	1	–	0	–	0	3	–	3	–	0
Iowa	2	–	1	–	0	6	–	2	–	1
Minnesota	2	–	1	–	0	5	–	2	–	1
Northwestern	1	–	1	–	0	2	–	2	–	1
Wisconsin	1	–	2	–	0	3	–	3	–	0
Indiana	0	–	0	–	0	2	–	2	–	0
Ohio State	0	–	3	–	0	3	–	3	–	0
Chicago	0	–	5	–	0	4	–	6	–	1
$ – Conference champion

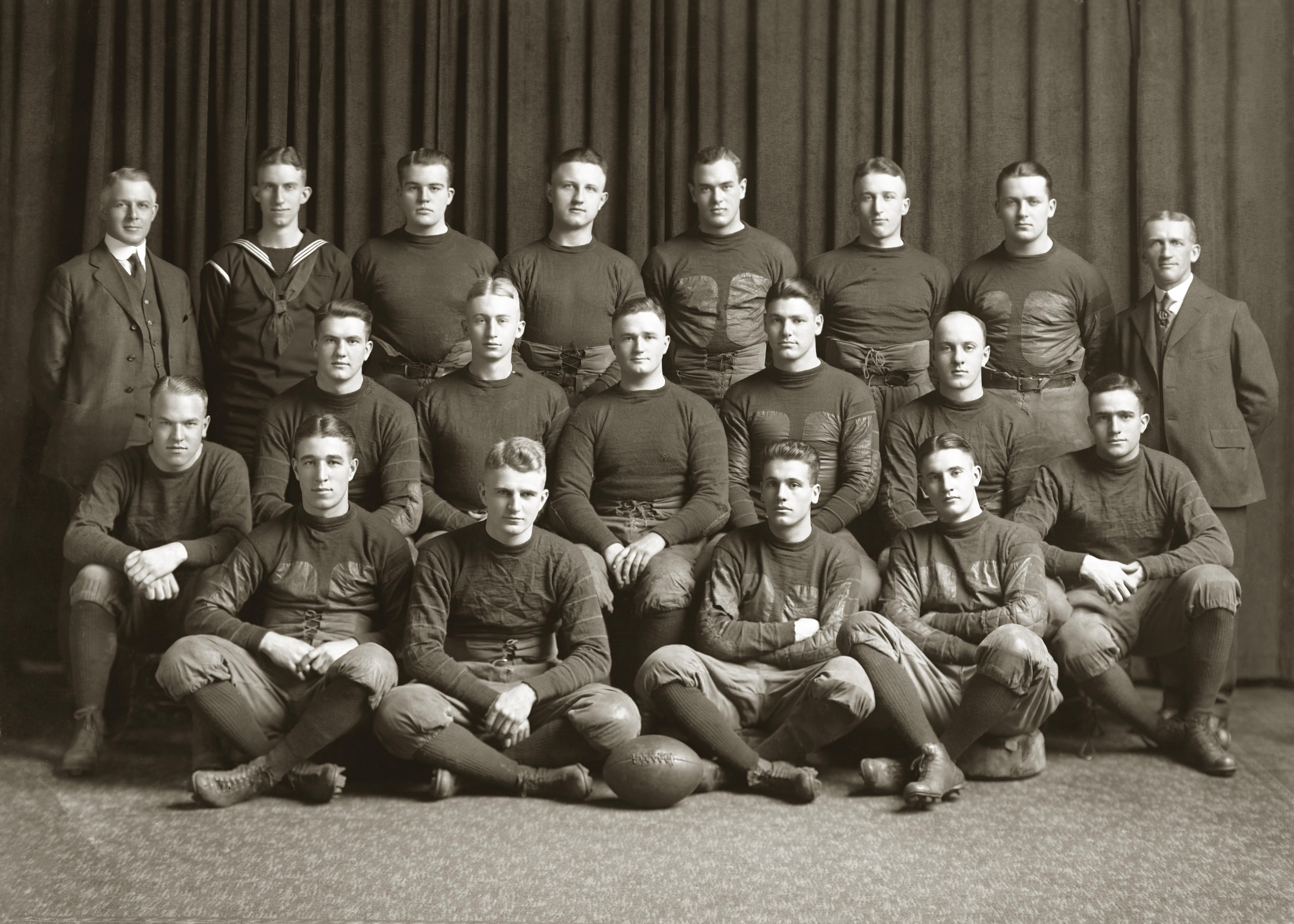
The undefeated 1918 Michigan Wolverines football team.

The 1918 Big Ten Conference football season was the 23rd season of college football played by the member schools of the Big Ten Conference (officially known as the Western Intercollegiate Conference Athletic Association and sometimes referred to as the Western Conference) and was a part of the 1918 college football season.

The 1918 season was played during World War I and the 1918 flu pandemic that killed 50 to 100 million persons worldwide. Due to travel and quarantine restrictions, many games were canceled, and the Big Ten teams played irregular schedules, some as short as five games and one as long as 11 games.

The 1918 Michigan Wolverines football team, under head coach Fielding H. Yost, finished with a perfect record of 5–0, shut out four of five opponents, led the conference in scoring defense (1.2 points per game allowed), and outscored all opponents by a combined total of 96 to 6. Fullback Frank Steketee was selected by Walter Camp as a first-team All-American, while tackle Angus Goetz and center Ernie Vick received first-team All-Big Ten honors. Michigan has been recognized as the 1918 national champion by the Billingsley Report and as a co-national champion with Pittsburgh by the National Championship Foundation.

The 1918 Illinois Fighting Illini football team, under head coach Robert Zuppke, tied for the Big Ten championship but lost two non-conference games. Center Jack Depler was a consensus first-team All-American. Tackle Burt Ingwersen received first-team All-Big Ten honors.

== Season overview ==
=== Results and team statistics ===
Conf. Rank	Team	Head coach	Overall record	Conf. record	PPG	PAG
1 (tie)	Illinois	Robert Zuppke	5–2	4–0	12.3	2.0
1 (tie)	Michigan	Fielding H. Yost	5–0	1–0	19.2	**1.2**
1 (tie)	Purdue	A. G. Scanlon	3–3	1–0	14.5	12.8
4 (tie)	Iowa	Howard Jones	6–2	2–1	13.7	4.0
4 (tie)	Minnesota	Henry L. Williams	5–2–1	2–1	16.6	4.9
6	Northwestern	Fred J. Murphy	2–2–1	1–1	15.0	12.2
7	Wisconsin	Guy Lowman	3–3	1–2	7.0	7.3
8	Ohio State	John Wilce	3–3	0–3	**22.3**	6.8
9	Chicago	Amos A. Stagg	4–6–1	0–5	11.6	8.3
10	Indiana	Ewald O. Stiehm	2–3	0–0	16.0	7.8

Key

PPG = Average of points scored per game (highest team average in bold)
PAG = Average of points allowed per game (lowest team average in bold)

=== Pre-season ===
==== Threat of cancellation ====
During the spring and summer of 1918, World War I moved into new phases with the German spring offensive followed by the Allies' Hundred Days Offensive. During the summer, the Big Ten universities considered calling off the fall football schedule. After the Department of War in mid-September encouraged the continuation of intercollegiate football, conference leadership decided to proceed with the football season. However, many of the conference's top players did not play due to military service. Players serving in the military included Chic Harley and Gaylord Stinchcomb of Ohio State and Archie Weston of Michigan.

The football season was also jeopardized by the 1918 flu pandemic which began in January 1918. The pandemic infected 500 million persons and resulted in the deaths of 50 to 100 million persons.

==== Quarantine and travel restrictions ====
In late September 1918, the Big Ten's faculty committee adopted a resolution that declared freshman eligible to play football, suspended the conference's activities as a controlling body during the period of emergency, and agreed to be governed by any rules of the War Department.

In late September, the War Department imposed quarantine and travel restrictions. The restrictions were clarified in early October, and included the following provisions: (1) a prohibition on more than one-and-a-half hours per day of football practice; (2) a prohibition on football games during the month of October that required absence from campus "for a longer period than from noon to taps on Saturday" (thus eliminating games that required lengthy travel); and (3) making allowance for only four November games per school, two at home and two on the road, "which shall in no case involve longer absences than from retreat Friday to taps Sunday."

The restrictions threatened to "kill" football in the west, where lengthy travel was required. Many games were canceled, including the planned resumption of the rivalry between Michigan and Minnesota. Concerns over spread of the flu pandemic also led to limitations on public gatherings and resulted in some games being played in stadiums with closed gates and with no spectators.

==== Coaching changes ====
Two Big Ten teams changed head coaches between the 1917 and 1918 football seasons:

- On September 10, 1918, Purdue's athletic director O. F. Cutts announced that Cleo A. O'Donnell was at his home in Boston and would probably not return as the school's head football coach. Cutts stated that assistant coach Butch Scanlon would take change of the team when students reported.
- At Wisconsin, John R. Richards was taken away from his duties as head football coach in mid-October 1918, after being appointed to a commission in charge of the welfare of war workers. Guy Lowman took over as head coach for the 1918 season; Lowman had come to Wisconsin in September 1917 to take charge of Wisconsin's physical education department and to serve as head coach of the basketball team and coach of the freshman football and baseball teams. Richards returned as head football coach in 1919.

=== Regular season ===
==== September 28 ====
On September 28, 1918, Iowa was the only Big Ten team to play a game.

- Great Lakes Naval Training Station 10, Iowa 0. Iowa lost to the Great Lakes Naval Training Station team, 10–0, before a crowd of 4,000 in Iowa City. Walter Eckersall in the Chicago Tribune called it "one of the best early games seen in the west in the last decade." The 1918 Great Lakes Navy Bluejackets football team compiled a 3–0–1 record against Big Ten opponents, went on to win the 1919 Rose Bowl, and featured three players (George Halas, Jimmy Conzelman, and Paddy Driscoll) who were later inducted into the Pro Football Hall of Fame. Charlie Bachman, who was hired as Northwestern's coach after the season and was later inducted into the College Football Hall of Fame, also played for the 1918 Great Lakes team.

==== October 5 ====
On October 5, 1918, the football season officially opened with six Big Ten football teams participating in non-conference games. The games resulted in five wins and one loss, giving the Big Ten a 5–2 non-conference record to that point in the season. Chicago, Northwestern, Wisconsin, and Purdue did not play games. Purdue had its game against Franklin College canceled and tried unsuccessfully to schedule a game against a team from Fort Benjamin Harrison. Wisconsin was unable to arrange a game due to the pandemic and instead conducted a scrimmage between the first and second teams.

- Michigan 33, Case 0. Michigan defeated the Case Scientific School (now Case Western Reserve University), 33–0, at Ferry Field in Ann Arbor, Michigan. Michigan came into the game with only two players (Angus Goetz and Abe Cohn) who had ever played for Michigan previously. The Detroit Free Press called Abe Cohn "an eye opener" as a ground gainer and noted: "He made a gain practically every time he was given the ball and, when he was stopped, it always took two or three men to turn the trick." Freshman Frank Steketee entered the game as a substitute and scored 21 points on three touchdowns and three kicks for goal.
- Illinois 3, Chanute Aviation Field 0. Illinois defeated the team from Chanute Aviation Field (Rantoul, Illinois), 3–0, before a crowd of 2,500 in Urbana, Illinois. The game's only points were scored by Illinois guard Leitsch on a field goal from the 38-yard line. The Chanute team was led by Archie Weston, who had played for Michigan in 1917. Eleven planes from the Chanute Field flew over the game. Illinois had originally been scheduled to play Iowa State on the date, but that game was canceled due to travel restrictions.
- Iowa 12, Nebraska 0. Iowa defeated Nebraska, 12–0, in Lincoln, Nebraska. After a scoreless first half, Iowa scored two touchdowns in the third quarter. The victory was the first for an Iowa team over a Nebraska team since 1899.
- Minnesota 0, Minnesota Consolidated 0. Minnesota's S.A.T.C. football team played a scoreless tie against Minnesota Consolidated, an all-star team organized by Sigmund Harris, before a crowd of 1,500 in Minneapolis. The Minneapolis Tribune wrote that the game proved to be "more or less of a good scrimmage" and "a tame affair with 'pep and punch' lacking on both sides." Minnesota had originally been scheduled to play South Dakota, but was forced to reschedule against the collection of all stars.
- Kentucky 24, Indiana 7. Indiana's S.A.T.C. team lost to Kentucky, 24–7, in Bloomington, Indiana. Kentucky's coach, Andrew Gill, was an Indiana alumnus.
- Ohio State 41, Ohio Wesleyan 0. Ohio State defeated Ohio Wesleyan, 41–0, in Columbus, Ohio.

==== October 12 ====
On October 12, 1918, four Big Ten teams played non-conference games, resulting in two wins and two losses and giving the conference a 7–4 record to that point in the season. The day's games gave the Big Ten a 7–4 non-conference record to that point in the season. Several planned games were canceled due to the flu pandemic, including games between Michigan and Camp Custer, Wisconsin and Ripon, Indiana and Wabash, and Purdue and DePauw. Minnesota staged a game between its S.A.T.C. unit and an "all star" unit that was actually the team's second string; The Minneapolis Tribune described it as "not an honest-to-goodness football game, but just a scrub affair."

- Great Lakes Naval Training Station 7, Illinois 0. Illinois lost to Great Lakes, 7–0, in Urbana, Illinois. Great Lakes scored a touchdown in the first quarter, and both teams were held scoreless thereafter. Paddy Driscoll returned the kickoff at the start of the second half for 65 yards.
- Iowa 27, Coe 0. Iowa defeated Coe College, 27–0, in Iowa City. The game was played before members of Iowa's Student Army Training Corps only. The game was canceled but then put back on schedule early on the day of the game.
- Ohio State 34, Denison 0. Ohio State defeated Denison, 34–0, in Columbus, Ohio. With Chic Harley serving in the military, halfback Thomas Davies was the star for the Buckeyes.
- United States Naval Reserve School 14, Chicago 7. Chicago lost to the team from the United States Naval Reserve School by a 14–7 score at Stagg Field in Chicago. The Naval Reserve School was established on Chicago's Municipal Pier in June 1918.

==== October 16 ====
On Wednesday, October 16, 1918, Chicago played the first of four midweek practice games.

- Chicago 46, Crane Tech 0. In a midweek game, Chicago defeated Crane Tech College, 46–0, at Stagg Field in Chicago. Amos Alonzo Stagg, Jr., made his college football debut in the game. Due to the influenza epidemic, city official forbade further athletic contests after this game.

==== October 19 ====
On October 19, 1918, only three of the Big Ten football teams saw action, playing and winning non-conference games. The day's games gave the Big Ten an 11–4 non-conference record to that point in the season, including Chicago's midweek practice game.

- Iowa 34, Cornell (IA) 0. Iowa defeated Cornell (IA), 34–0, in Iowa City.
- Minnesota 30, Overland Aviation Station 0. Minnesota, playing as an S.A.T.C. unit, defeated the Overland Aviation mechanics, 30–0, at Northrop Field in Minneapolis. The game was attended by 5,000 persons limited to soldiers from the Overland building and students enrolled in S.A.T.C. Minnesota scored five touchdowns but missed all five attempts at goal after touchdown. The Overland team was led by halfback Fred Chicken.
- Chicago 41, Hyde Park High School 0 (game played Friday, October 18). In an "unadvertised crowdless practice game", Chicago defeated Hyde Park High School, 41–0. Amos Alonzo Stagg, Jr., "ran the team for three quarters."

==== October 26 ====
On October 26, 1918, five of the Big Ten football teams participated in non-conference games, resulting in two wins and three losses. The day's games gave the Big Ten a 13–7 non-conference record to that point in the season, including Chicago's midweek practice games.

- United States Naval Reserve School 7, Illinois 0. Illinois lost, 7–0, against the team from the United States Naval Reserve School at Municipal Pier. The game was played in Urbana, Illinois. Due to health concerns, "the gates were barred and the spectators limited to coaches, water carriers, officials, and the few others necessary to pull off a contest."
- DePauw 9, Purdue 7. Purdue was upset by DePauw, 9–7, in Lafayette, Indiana. The DePauw team was delayed by a freight wreck that blocked the railroad near Roachdale, with the players traveling the remaining 45 miles in automobiles. The game began at 5 p.m. and was played in shortened quarters. DePauw threw a touchdown pass for the victory with minutes to play in the "gathering darkness."
- Minnesota 25, St. Thomas 7. The Minnesota S.A.T.C. football team defeated St. Thomas, 25–7, in a practice game in St. Paul, Minnesota. The game was played on a snow-covered field and in ankle deep mud.
- Northwestern 0, Great Lakes Naval 0. Northwestern and Great Lakes Naval Training Station played to a scoreless tie before a crowd of 15,000. The game was played in mud that was ankle deep.
- Camp Grant 7, Wisconsin 0. Wisconsin lost to Camp Grant, 7–0, in Madison, Wisconsin. Camp Grant's touchdown was scored by former Wisconsin star, Stark, who intercepted a pass and returned it for a touchdown. The game followed the lifting of a quarantine at Camp Grant where the influenza epidemic took a death toll of 1,040 men.

==== October 29 ====
On Tuesday, October 29, 1918, Chicago played the second of four midweek practice games.

- Chicago 6, Loyola Academy 0. In a midweek practice game, Chicago defeated the Loyola Academy prep school, 6–0. Amos Alonzo Stagg, Jr., sustained a broken collar bone in the game.

==== November 2 ====
On November 2, 1918, the Big Ten football teams played two conference games and four non-conference games. Michigan and Ohio State were idle. The day's games gave the Big Ten a 16–9 non-conference record to that point in the season, including Chicago's midweek practice games. A planned game between Michigan and Northwestern was canceled by order of the Health Board.

- Illinois 19, Iowa 0. Illinois defeated Iowa, 19–0, at Iowa City. Illinois scored touchdowns in the second, third, and fourth quarters. The Des Moines Register credited Illinois' victory to "perfectly executed forward passes and machinelike teamwork."
- Purdue 7, Chicago 3. Purdue defeated Chicago, 7–3, at Lafayette, Indiana. The Purdue victory broke a 20-game losing streak against Chicago dating back to 1898. According to a newspaper account, Chicago's coach Stagg "used everything at his command to put a winning score across, but the plucky Purdue men foiled him."
- Minnesota 59, Carleton-St. Olaf 6. Minnesota's S.A.T.C. team defeated the Carleton-St. Olaf team, 59–6, before a crowd of 1,500 persons at Lexington Park in St. Paul, Minnesota. Minnesota captain Norman Kingsley returned the opening kickoff of the second half 85 yards and scored two touchdowns. Fullback Gus Ekberg also scored two touchdowns.
- United States Naval Reserve School 25, Northwestern 0. Northwestern's S.A.T.C. team lost, 25–0, to the United States Naval Reserve School from Chicago's Municipal Pier. The game was played at Evanston Field.
- Wisconsin 21, Beloit 0. In a game played behind closed gates in Madison, Wisconsin defeated Beloit, 21–0. Guy Sundt scored two touchdowns for Wisconsin.
- Camp Taylor 7, Indiana 3. Indiana lost to Camp Taylor, 7–3, at Washington Park in Indianapolis. The Camp Taylor team was made up of former college stars who were then serving in the Army.

==== November 6 ====
On Wednesday, November 6, 1918, Chicago played the third of four midweek practice games.

- Chicago 0, Crane College 0. In a midweek practice game, Chicago played a scoreless tie with the Crane College S.A.T.C. on the Midway practice field. The game ended five minutes into the second half, because the Crane soldiers had to return to their barracks. A "ghost ball" was put into play late in the game because of the darkness on the field.

==== November 9 ====
On November 9, 1918, the Big Ten football teams played three conference games and four non-conference games. The non-conference games all resulted in victories. The day's games gave the Big Ten a 20–9–1 non-conference record to that point in the season, including Chicago's midweek practice games.

- Michigan 13, Chicago 0. Michigan defeated Chicago, 13–0, at Stagg Field in Chicago. The two teams, which had been one another's principal rivals from 1892 to 1905, had not met for 13 years. The game was played as negotiations were underway to end World War I, and the Chicago Daily Tribune wrote: "While the nations of the world are hoping for an armistice, the resumption of hostilities between forces guided by Gens. Yost and Stagg brought joy to thousands of football fans, and the opening battle attracted approximately 7,000 of them." Chicago's Stegman attempted a dropkick from the 45-yard line, but Goetz broke through the Chicago line and blocked the kick. Goetz picked it up and returned it 55 yards for a touchdown.
- Illinois 22, Wisconsin 0. Illinois defeated Wisconsin, 22–0, before a crowd of 7,000 at Camp Randall Field in Madison, Wisconsin. According to the Chicago Daily Tribune, the Badgers were "outclassed and outweighed" while the Illini "fought like wildcats" and had the Badgers on the defensive through most of the game.
- Iowa 6, Minnesota 0. Iowa defeated the Minnesota S.A.T.C. team, 6–0, in Iowa City. The victory was Iowa's first in the Iowa–Minnesota football rivalry, having lost 12 consecutive games dating back to 1891. Iowa's touchdown was scored in the third quarter after fullback Fred Lohman threw a pass from his own 23-yard line that was caught by William Donnelly and taken to Minnesota's four-yard line. Lohman scored the winning touchdown three plays later.
- Purdue 14, Michigan Agricultural 6. Purdue defeated Michigan Agricultural, 14–6, in Lansing, Michigan. Purdue scored twice in the second quarter, both times on interceptions returned for touchdowns.
- Northwestern 47, Knox 7. Northwestern defeated Knox College, 47–7. Knox scored on its first drive with a pass covering more than 90 yards. Northwestern then scored seven touchdowns.
- Indiana 41, Fort Harrison 0. Indiana defeated the team from Fort Benjamin Harrison, 41–0, in Bloomington, Indiana. Indiana allowed only two first downs in the game.
- Ohio State 56, Case 0. Ohio State defeated Case, 56–0, on a muddy field in Columbus, Ohio.

==== November 16 ====
On November 16, 1918, the Big Ten teams played three conference games and four non-conference games. The non-conference games all resulted in victories. The day's games gave the Big Ten a 24–9–1 non-conference record to that point in the season, including Chicago's midweek practice games.

Five days earlier, the Armistice of 11 November 1918 was signed, marking the end of fighting in World War I. Over nine million combatants and seven million civilians died as a result of the war.

- Illinois 13, Ohio State 0. Illinois defeated Ohio State, 13–0, on a muddy field in Champaign, Illinois. Kirkpatrick and Sabo scored touchdowns for Illinois.
- Minnesota 6, Wisconsin 0. Minnesota defeated Wisconsin, 6–0, before a crowd of 8,000 at Northrop Field in Minneapolis. At the end of the first quarter, 30 soldiers from the Fort Snelling hospital, all of whom had been injured in the war in France, some with missing limbs, came "limping and stumping" into the stands as the crowd stood, cheered, and applauded. Gus Ekberg scored the game's only touchdown.
- Northwestern 21, Chicago 6. Northwestern defeated Chicago, 21–6, in the rain, fog, and mud before a crowd of 8,000 at Evanston Field.
- Michigan 15, Syracuse 0. Michigan defeated Syracuse, 16–0, in pouring rain at Ferry Field in Ann Arbor. Steketee kicked three field goals and returned an interception 20 yards for a touchdown. The victory over Syracuse enhanced Michigan's reputation, as Syracuse and Pittsburgh had been viewed as the most powerful teams in the East.
- Purdue 53, Wabash 6. Purdue defeated Wabash, 53–6, at Washington Park in Indianapolis.
- Iowa 21, Iowa State 0. Iowa defeated Iowa State, 21–0, in Iowa City. Neither team scored in the first half, but Iowa scored one touchdown in the third quarter and two in the fourth quarter. Fullback Fred Lohman returned a punt 80 yards to set the stage for one of Iowa's touchdowns. The crowd was reported to be the smallest ever to watch an Iowa–Iowa State football rivalry to that point in time.
- Indiana 13, DePauw 0. Indiana defeated DePauw, 13–0, before a crowd of 3,000 at Jordan Field in Bloomington, Indiana.

==== November 19 ====
On Wednesday, November 19, 1918, Chicago played the fourth of four midweek practice games.

- Chicago 19, YMCA 0. Chicago defeated a YMCA college team, 19-0, at Stagg Field in Chicago.

==== November 23 ====
On November 23, 1918, the Big Ten teams played three conference games and three non-conference games. Indiana was idle, having concluded its season the previous week. The day's games gave the Big Ten a 26–11–1 non-conference record to that point in the season, including Chicago's midweek practice games.

- Illinois 29, Chicago 0. Illinois defeated Chicago, 29–0, at Stagg Field in Chicago.
- Iowa 23, Northwestern 7. Iowa defeated Northwestern, 23-7, in Iowa City.
- Wisconsin 14, Ohio State 3. Wisconsin defeated Ohio State, 14-3, in Columbus, Ohio.

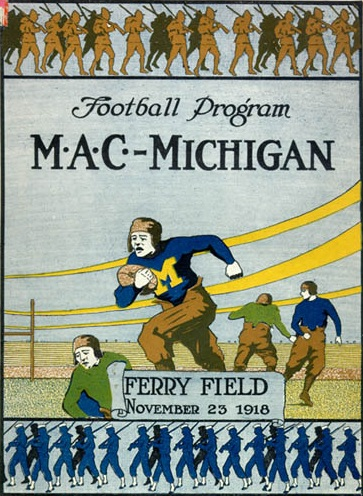
1918 M.A.C. program

- Michigan 21, Michigan Agricultural 6. Michigan defeated Michigan Agricultural, 21–6, at Ferry Field in Ann Arbor before a crowd estimated at between 10,000 and 20,000 persons. The Aggies had defeated Knute Rockne's Notre Dame the previous week (the only defeat of the year for the Fighting Irish). Michigan scored two touchdowns in the second quarter on a short run by Abe Cohn and a fumble recovery and return by Angus Goetz. Quarterback Mike Knode scored Michigan's final touchdown in the third quarter on a 30-yard run after faking a pass. The start of the game was delayed by lengthy pre-game ceremonies featuring the French Blue Devils, performances by the U. of M. Army and Navy bands and the M.A.C. bands, parades by the Students' Army Training Corps and Naval Units, and a fly-over by former Michigan football captain Pat Smith in his aeroplane. Because of the delay, the game was concluded in darkness.
- Notre Dame 26, Purdue 6. Notre Dame defeated Purdue, 26-6, before a crowd of 7,000 at Stuart Field in Lafayette, Indiana.
- Municipal Pier (Chicago) 20, Minnesota 6.

==== November 28 ====
On Thanksgiving Day, November 28, one Big Ten team played a non-conference game, resulting in a victory.

- Wisconsin 7, Michigan Agricultural 6. Wisconsin defeated Michigan Agricultural, 7–6, at Camp Randall Field in Madison, Wisconsin. Michigan Agricultural took a 6–0 lead in the second quarter when Archer blocked a punt and returned it to the one-yard line; Ferris ran the final yard for touchdown. Wisconsin scored a touchdown with a minute remaining in the game, and Barr converted the extra point to give the game to the Badgers.

==== November 30 ====
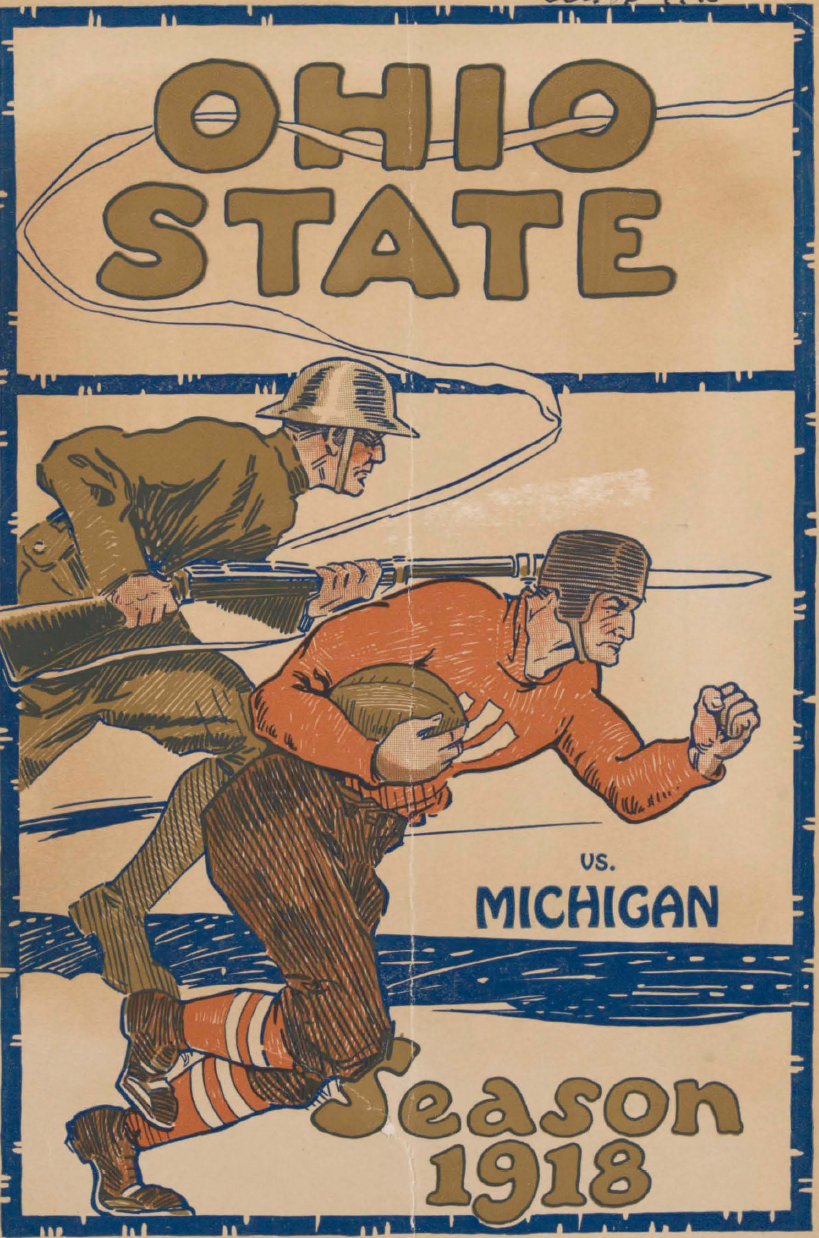
1918 Ohio State program

On November 30, 1918, the Big Ten teams played two conference games and two non-conference games. Illinois, Indiana, Northwestern, and Wisconsin were all idle, having already concluded their seasons. The day's games gave the Big Ten a 28–12–1 (.695) non-conference record for the season, including Chicago's midweek practice games.

- Michigan 14, Ohio State 0. Michigan defeated Ohio State, 14–0, in Columbus, Ohio. The game was played on a wet, muddy and slippery field that handicapped the offensive players. The teams played to a scoreless tie in a first half. Michigan's first touchdown was set up by a 73-yard punt from Frank Steketee that "stuck fast in the mud" at Ohio State's two- or three-yard line. Michigan's defense held, and Ohio State was forced to punt from his end zone. Angus Goetz blocked the punt and recovered it in the end zone for a touchdown. Later in the game, Steketee faked a run around the end and passed to Robert J. Dunne who was "camped near the uprights."
- Minnesota 7, Chicago 0. Minnesota defeated Chicago, 6–0, in Chicago. Gus Ekberg scored the game's only points on a run in the second quarter. The result was Minnesota's fifth consecutive victory over Chicago.
- Great Lakes Naval Station 27, Purdue 0. The Great Lakes Naval Station defeated Purdue, 27–0, at Northwestern Field in Evanston, Indiana. Great Lakes led, 6–0, at halftime, but scored 21 points in the third quarter to extend its lead.
- Iowa 0, Camp Dodge 0. Iowa and Camp Dodge played to a scoreless tie before a small crowd at Drake Stadium in Des Moines.

=== Post-season ===
On December 7, 1918, the Big Ten's faculty representatives met in Chicago and voted to disregard eligibility rules for the 1918 season, thus granting a total of four years of eligibility to those who played as freshman in 1918.

Two Big Ten team changed their head coaches between the 1919 and 1919 football seasons.

- On January 7, 1919, Northwestern announced that Fred J. Murphy had resigned after five years as the school's head football coach. Murphy stated that the resignation was required to allow him to devote his full attention to his mining interests in Colorado. Three weeks later, Charlie Bachman was appointed as Northwestern's head football and track coach.
- John R. Richards returned to his post as head coach at Wisconsin after wartime government service.

== Awards and honors ==
=== All-Big Ten honors ===
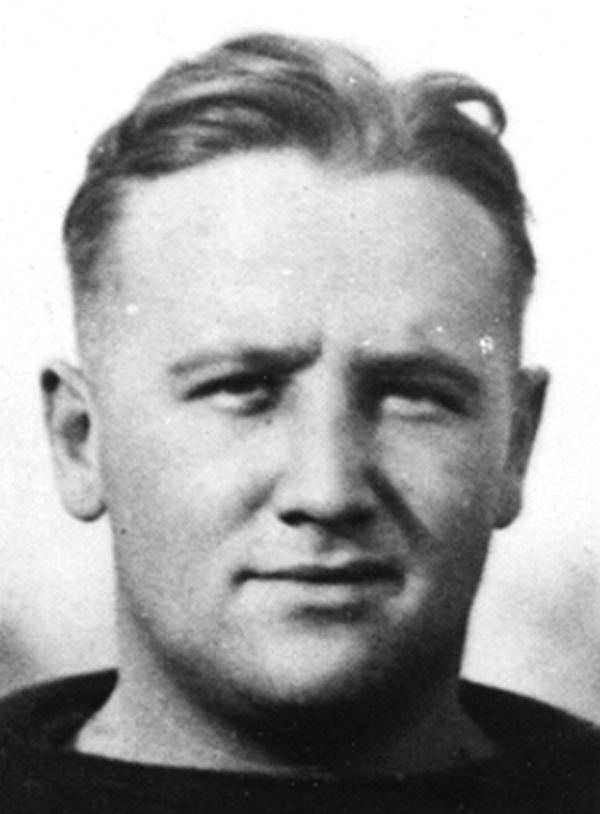
Jack Depler of Illinois was the Big Ten's only consensus All-American.

The following chart lists players who received first-team honors on the 1918 All-Big Ten Conference football team from Walter Eckersall (WE) in the Chicago Tribune. It also includes players listed as members of the 1918 "All-Conference Team" as published in the "ESPN Big Ten Football Encyclopedia" (BTFE).

Position	Name	Team	Selectors
End	Clarence A. MacDonald	Ohio State	BTFE, WE
End	Robert Reed	Iowa	BTFE, WE
Tackle	Burt Ingwersen	Illinois	BTFE, WE
Tackle	Angus Goetz	Michigan	BTFE, WE
Guard	Albert W. T. Mohr, Jr.	Illinois	BTFE, WE
Guard	Harry Hunzelman	Iowa	BTFE, WE
Center	Ernie Vick	Michigan	BTFE, WE
Quarterback	Marshall Underhill	Northwestern	BTFE, WE
Quarterback	Eber Simpson	Wisconsin	BTFE
Halfback	Jesse B. Kirkpatrick	Illinois	BTFE, WE
Halfback	Frank Steketee	Michigan	BTFE, WE
Fullback	Norman Kingsley	Minnesota	BTFE, WE

=== All-American honors ===
Only one Big Ten player, center Jack Depler of Illinois, was recognized as a consensus first-team player on the 1918 College Football All-America Team. Depler was selected as a first-team center by the Frank Menke Syndicate. Michigan fullback Frank Steketee also received first-team honors from Walter Camp.
