= 1918 Chicago Maroons football team =

American college football season

1918 Chicago Maroons football
- Conference: Big Ten Conference
- Record: 4–6–1 (0–5 Big Ten)
- Head coach: Amos Alonzo Stagg (27th season)
- Home stadium: Stagg Field

1918 Big Ten Conference football standings
	Conf.					Overall
Team	W		L		T	W		L		T
Michigan +	2	–	0	–	0	5	–	0	–	0
Illinois +	4	–	0	–	0	5	–	2	–	0
Purdue +	1	–	0	–	0	3	–	3	–	0
Iowa	2	–	1	–	0	6	–	2	–	1
Minnesota	2	–	1	–	0	5	–	2	–	1
Northwestern	1	–	1	–	0	2	–	2	–	1
Wisconsin	1	–	2	–	0	3	–	3	–	0
Indiana	0	–	0	–	0	2	–	2	–	0
Ohio State	0	–	3	–	0	3	–	3	–	0
Chicago	0	–	5	–	0	4	–	6	–	1
$ – Conference champion

The 1918 Chicago Maroons football team was an American football team that represented the University of Chicago during the 1918 Big Ten Conference football season. In their 27th season under head coach Amos Alonzo Stagg, the Maroons compiled a 4–6–1 record, finished in last place in the Big Ten Conference, but still outscored their opponents by a combined total of 128 to 91. No Chicago players were selected to the first team of that All-America or All-Big Ten teams.

== Schedule ==
Date	Opponent	Site	Result	Attendance
October 12	Chicago Naval Reserve*	Stagg Field; Chicago, IL	L 7–14	
October 16	Crane J.C.*	Stagg Field; Chicago, IL	W 46–0	
October 18	Hyde Park High*	Stagg Field; Chicago, IL	W 41–0	
October 29	Loyola Academy*	Stagg Field; Chicago, IL	W 6–0	
November 2	at Purdue	Stuart Field; West Lafayette, IN (rivalry)	L 3–7	
November 6	Crane J.C.*	Stagg Field; Chicago, IL	T 0–0	
November 9	Michigan	Stagg Field; Chicago, IL (rivalry)	L 0–13	8,000
November 16	at Northwestern	Northwestern Field; Evanston, IL	L 6–21	
November 19	Chicago YMCA*	Stagg Field; Chicago, IL	W 19–0	
November 23	Illinois	Stagg Field; Chicago, IL	L 0–29	
November 30	Minnesota	Stagg Field; Chicago, IL	L 0–7	3,000
*Non-conference game

== Quarantine and travel restrictions ==
In late September 1918, the Big Ten's faculty committee suspended the conference's activities as a controlling body during the period of emergency and agreed to be governed by any rules of the War Department.

In early October, the War Department announced quarantine and travel restrictions which included the following: (1) a prohibition on more than one-and-a-half hours per day of football practice; (2) a prohibition on football games during the month of October that required absence from campus "for a longer period than from noon to taps on Saturday" (thus eliminating games that required lengthy travel); and (3) making allowance for only four November games per school, two at home and two on the road, "which shall in no case involve longer absences than from retreat Friday to taps Sunday."

The restrictions threatened to "kill" football in the west, where lengthy travel was required. Many games were canceled, and concerns over spread of the 1918 flu pandemic also led to limitations on public gatherings and resulted in some games being canceled and others being played in stadiums with closed gates and no spectators.

== Games summaries ==
On Saturday, October 12, 1918, Chicago lost to Chicago Naval Reserve by a 14–7 score at Stagg Field in Chicago. The Naval Reserve School was established on Chicago's Municipal Pier in June 1918.

On Wednesday, October 16, 1918, Chicago played the first of four midweek practice games. The Maroons defeated Crane Tech College, 46–0, at Stagg Field in Chicago. Amos Alonzo Stagg, Jr., made his college football debut in the game. Due to the influenza epidemic, city official forbade further athletic contests after this game.

On Friday, October 18, 1918, in an "unadvertised crowdless practice game", Chicago defeated Hyde Park High School, 41–0. Amos Alonzo Stagg, Jr., "ran the team for three quarters."

On Tuesday, October 29, 1918, Chicago played the second of four midweek practice games. This time, the Maroons defeated the Loyola Academy prep school, 6–0. Amos Alonzo Stagg, Jr., sustained a broken collar bone in the game.

On Saturday, November 2, 1918, Purdue defeated Chicago, 7–3, at Lafayette, Indiana. The Purdue victory broke a 20-game losing streak against Chicago dating back to 1898. According to a newspaper account, Chicago's coach Stagg "used everything at his command to put a winning score across, but the plucky Purdue men foiled him."

On Wednesday, November 6, 1918, Chicago played the third of four midweek practice games. The Maroons played a scoreless tie with the Crane College S.A.T.C. on the Midway practice field. The game ended five minutes into the second half, because the Crane soldiers had to return to their barracks. A "ghost ball" was put into play late in the game because of the darkness on the field.

On Saturday, November 9, 1918, Michigan defeated Chicago, 13–0, at Stagg Field in Chicago. The two teams, which had been one another's principal rivals from 1892 to 1905, had not met for 13 years. The game was played as negotiations were underway to end World War I, and the Chicago Daily Tribune wrote: "While the nations of the world are hoping for an armistice, the resumption of hostilities between forces guided by Gens. Yost and Stagg brought joy to thousands of football fans, and the opening battle attracted approximately 7,000 of them." Chicago's Stegman attempted a dropkick from the 45-yard line, but Goetz broke through the Chicago line and blocked the kick. Goetz picked it up and returned it 55 yards for a touchdown.

On Saturday, November 16, 1918, Northwestern defeated Chicago, 21–6, in the rain, fog, and mud before a crowd of 8,000 at Evanston Field.

On Wednesday, November 19, 1918, Chicago played the fourth of four midweek practice games. The Maroons defeated a YMCA college team, 19-0, at Stagg Field in Chicago.

On Saturday, November 23, 1918, Illinois defeated Chicago, 29–0, at Stagg Field in Chicago.

On Saturday, November 30, 1918, Minnesota defeated Chicago, 6–0, in Chicago. Gus Ekberg scored the game's only points on a run in the second quarter. The result was Minnesota's fifth consecutive victory over Chicago.
