= 1918 Minnesota Golden Gophers football team =

American college football season

1918 Minnesota Golden Gophers football
- Conference: Big Ten Conference
- Record: 5–2–1 (2–1 Big Ten)
- Head coach: Henry L. Williams (19th season)
- Captain: Norman Kingsley
- Home stadium: Northrop Field

1918 Big Ten Conference football standings
	Conf.					Overall
Team	W		L		T	W		L		T
Michigan +	2	–	0	–	0	5	–	0	–	0
Illinois +	4	–	0	–	0	5	–	2	–	0
Purdue +	1	–	0	–	0	3	–	3	–	0
Iowa	2	–	1	–	0	6	–	2	–	1
Minnesota	2	–	1	–	0	5	–	2	–	1
Northwestern	1	–	1	–	0	2	–	2	–	1
Wisconsin	1	–	2	–	0	3	–	3	–	0
Indiana	0	–	0	–	0	2	–	2	–	0
Ohio State	0	–	3	–	0	3	–	3	–	0
Chicago	0	–	5	–	0	4	–	6	–	1
$ – Conference champion

The 1918 Minnesota Golden Gophers football team was an American football team that represented the University of Minnesota in the 1918 Big Ten Conference football season. In their 19th year under head coach Henry L. Williams, the Golden Gophers compiled a 5–2–1 record (2–1 against Big Ten Conference opponents) and outscored their opponents by a combined total of 133 to 39.

The 1918 team ended up in a tie for fourth place in the Big Ten. The conference had to suspend its normal eligibility requirements due to the large number of students who had entered the military.

Fullback Norman Kingsley received first-team All-Big Ten honors.

== Schedule ==
Date	Opponent	Site	Result	Attendance
October 5	All-Stars*	Northrop Field; Minneapolis, MN	T 0–0	15,000
October 19	Overland Aviation Station*	Northrop Field; Minneapolis, MN	W 30–0	5,000
October 26	at St. Thomas (MN)*	St. Thomas gridiron; Saint Paul, MN	W 25–7	500
November 2	vs. Carleton–St. Olaf*	Lexington Park; Saint Paul, MN	W 59–6	1,500
November 9	at Iowa	Iowa Field; Iowa City, IA (rivalry)	L 0–6	5,000
November 16	Wisconsin	Northrop Field; Minneapolis, MN (rivalry)	W 6–0	8,000
November 23	Chicago Naval Reserve*	Northrop Field; Minneapolis, MN	L 6–20	5,000
November 30	at Chicago	Stagg Field; Chicago, IL	W 7–0	3,000
*Non-conference game

== Game summaries ==
On October 5, 1918, Minnesota's S.A.T.C. (Student Army Training Corps) football team played a scoreless tie against Minnesota Consolidated, an all-star team organized by Sigmund Harris, before a crowd of 1,500 in Minneapolis. The Minneapolis Tribune wrote that the game proved to be "more or less of a good scrimmage" and "a tame affair with 'pep and punch' lacking on both sides." Minnesota had originally been scheduled to play South Dakota, but was forced to reschedule against the collection of all stars.

On October 19, 1918, Minnesota, playing as an S.A.T.C. unit, defeated the Overland Aviation mechanics, 30–0, at Northrop Field in Minneapolis. The game was attended by 5,000 persons limited to soldiers from the Overland building and students enrolled in S.A.T.C. Minnesota scored five touchdowns but missed all five attempts at goal after touchdown. The Overland team was led by halfback Fred Chicken.

On October 26, 1918, the Minnesota S.A.T.C. football team defeated St. Thomas, 25–7, in a practice game in St. Paul, Minnesota. The game was played on a snow-covered field and in ankle deep mud.

On November 2, 1918, Minnesota's S.A.T.C. team defeated the Carleton-St. Olaf team, 59–6, before a crowd of 1,500 persons at Lexington Park in St. Paul, Minnesota. Minnesota captain Norman Kingsley returned the opening kickoff of the second half 85 yards and scored two touchdowns. Fullback Gus Ekberg also scored two touchdowns.

On November 9, 1918, Iowa defeated the Minnesota S.A.T.C. team, 6–0, in Iowa City. The victory was Iowa's first in the Iowa–Minnesota football rivalry, having lost 12 consecutive games dating back to 1891. Iowa's touchdown was scored in the third quarter after fullback Fred Lohman threw a pass from his own 23-yard line that was caught by William Donnelly and taken to Minnesota's four-yard line. Lohman scored the winning touchdown three plays later.

On November 16, 1918, Minnesota defeated Wisconsin, 6–0, before a crowd of 8,000 at Northrop Field in Minneapolis. At the end of the first quarter, 30 soldiers from the Fort Snelling hospital, all of whom had been injured in the war in France, some with missing limbs, came "limping and stumping" into the stands as the crowd stood, cheered, and applauded. Gus Ekberg scored the game's only touchdown.

On November 23, 1918, Minnesota lost to Chicago Naval Reserve, a team from the United States Naval Reserve School at Chicago's Municipal Pier by a 20 to 6 score.
