= 1918 Wisconsin Badgers football team =

American college football season

1918 Wisconsin Badgers football
- Conference: Big Ten Conference
- Record: 3–3 (1–2 Big Ten)
- Head coach: Guy Lowman (1st season)
- Captain: Berthold Mann
- Home stadium: Camp Randall Stadium

1918 Big Ten Conference football standings
	Conf.					Overall
Team	W		L		T	W		L		T
Michigan +	2	–	0	–	0	5	–	0	–	0
Illinois +	4	–	0	–	0	5	–	2	–	0
Purdue +	1	–	0	–	0	3	–	3	–	0
Iowa	2	–	1	–	0	6	–	2	–	1
Minnesota	2	–	1	–	0	5	–	2	–	1
Northwestern	1	–	1	–	0	2	–	2	–	1
Wisconsin	1	–	2	–	0	3	–	3	–	0
Indiana	0	–	0	–	0	2	–	2	–	0
Ohio State	0	–	3	–	0	3	–	3	–	0
Chicago	0	–	5	–	0	4	–	6	–	1
$ – Conference champion

The 1918 Wisconsin Badgers football team was an American football team that represented the University of Wisconsin in the 1918 Big Ten Conference football season. In its first and only season under head coach Guy Lowman, the team compiled a 3–3 record (1–2 against conference opponents), finished in seventh place in the Big Ten Conference, and was outscored by its opponents by a combined total of 44 to 42. The team's captain was Berthold Mann.

Quarterback Eber Simpson was recognized as a first-team player on the 1918 All-Big Ten Conference football team.

== Schedule ==
Date	Opponent	Site	Result	Attendance
October 26	Camp Grant*	Camp Randall Stadium; Madison, WI	L 0–7	
November 2	Beloit*	Camp Randall Stadium; Madison, WI	W 21–0	
November 9	Illinois^{†}	Camp Randall Stadium; Madison, WI	L 0–22	7,000
November 16	at Minnesota	Northrop Field; Minneapolis, MN (rivalry)	L 0–6	8,000
November 23	at Ohio State	Ohio Field; Columbus, OH	W 14–3	
November 28	Michigan Agricultural*	Camp Randall Stadium; Madison, WI	W 7–6	
*Non-conference game; ^{†}Homecoming

== Pre-season ==
John R. Richards was taken away from his duties as Wisconsin's head football coach in mid-October 1918, after being appointed to a commission in charge of the welfare of war workers. Guy Lowman took over as head coach for the 1918 season; Lowman had come to Wisconsin in September 1917 to take charge of Wisconsin's physical education department and to serve as head coach of the basketball team and coach of the freshman football and baseball teams. Richards returned as head football coach in 1919.

== Game summaries ==
On October 26, 1918, Wisconsin lost to Camp Grant, 7–0, in Madison, Wisconsin. Camp Grant's touchdown was scored by former Wisconsin star, Stark, who intercepted a pass and returned it for a touchdown. The game followed the lifting of a quarantine at Camp Grant where the influenza epidemic took a death toll of 1,040 men.

On November 2, 1918, in a game played behind closed gates in Madison, Wisconsin defeated Beloit College, 21–0. Guy Sundt scored two touchdowns for Wisconsin.

On November 9, 1918, Illinois defeated Wisconsin, 22–0, before a crowd of 7,000 at Camp Randall Field in Madison, Wisconsin. According to the Chicago Daily Tribune, the Badgers were "outclassed and outweighed" while the Illini "fought like wildcats" and had the Badgers on the defensive through most of the game.

On November 16, 1918, Minnesota defeated Wisconsin, 6–0, before a crowd of 8,000 at Northrop Field in Minneapolis. At the end of the first quarter, 30 soldiers from the Fort Snelling hospital, all of whom had been injured in the war in France, some with missing limbs, came "limping and stumping" into the stands as the crowd stood, cheered, and applauded. Gus Ekberg scored the game's only touchdown.

On November 23, 1918, Wisconsin defeated Ohio State, 14-3, in Columbus, Ohio.

On Thanksgiving Day, November 28, Wisconsin defeated Michigan Agricultural, 7–6, at Camp Randall Field. Michigan Agricultural took a 6–0 lead in the second quarter when Archer blocked a punt and returned it to the one-yard line; Ferris ran the final yard for touchdown. Wisconsin scored a touchdown with a minute remaining in the game, and Barr converted the extra point to give the game to the Badgers.
