= 1918 Indiana Hoosiers football team =

American college football season

1918 Indiana Hoosiers football
- Conference: Big Ten Conference
- Record: 2–2 (0–0 Big Ten)
- Head coach: Ewald O. Stiehm (3rd season)
- Captain: Russell Julius
- Home stadium: Jordan Field

1918 Big Ten Conference football standings
	Conf.					Overall
Team	W		L		T	W		L		T
Michigan +	2	–	0	–	0	5	–	0	–	0
Illinois +	4	–	0	–	0	5	–	2	–	0
Purdue +	1	–	0	–	0	3	–	3	–	0
Iowa	2	–	1	–	0	6	–	2	–	1
Minnesota	2	–	1	–	0	5	–	2	–	1
Northwestern	1	–	1	–	0	2	–	2	–	1
Wisconsin	1	–	2	–	0	3	–	3	–	0
Indiana	0	–	0	–	0	2	–	2	–	0
Ohio State	0	–	3	–	0	3	–	3	–	0
Chicago	0	–	5	–	0	4	–	6	–	1
$ – Conference champion

The 1918 Indiana Hoosiers football team was an American football team that represented Indiana University during the 1918 Big Ten Conference football season. In their third season under head coach Ewald O. Stiehm, the Hoosiers compiled a 2–2 record and played no games against Big Ten Conference teams. No Indiana players received either All-American or All-Big Ten honors.

== Schedule ==
Date	Opponent	Site	Result
October 5	Kentucky*	Jordan Field; Bloomington, IN (rivalry)	L 7–24
November 2	vs. Camp Zachary Taylor*	Washington Park; Indianapolis, IN	L 3–7
November 9	Camp Harrison*	Jordan Field; Bloomington, IN	W 41–0
November 16	DePauw	Jordan Field; Bloomington, IN	W 13–0
*Non-conference game

== Game summaries ==
On October 5, 1918, Indiana's S.A.T.C. team lost to Kentucky, 24–7, in Bloomington, Indiana. Kentucky's coach, Andrew Gill, was an Indiana alumnus.

Indiana's game against Wabash, scheduled for October 12, was canceled due to the 1918 flu pandemic.

On November 2, 1918, Indiana lost to Camp Zachary Taylor, 7–3, at Washington Park in Indianapolis. The Camp Taylor team was made up of former college stars who were then serving in the Army.

On November 9, 1918, Indiana defeated the team from Fort Benjamin Harrison, 41–0, in Bloomington, Indiana. Indiana allowed only two first downs in the game.

On November 16, 1918, Indiana defeated DePauw, 13–0, before a crowd of 3,000 at Jordan Field in Bloomington, Indiana.

On November 25, 1918, Coach Stiehm sent a telegram instructing players to hand in their equipment. The season was ended early because of the pandemic.
