= 1918 Purdue Boilermakers football team =

American college football season

1918 Purdue Boilermakers football

Big Ten co-champion
- Conference: Big Ten Conference
- Record: 3–3 (1–0 Big Ten)
- Head coach: A. G. Scanlon (1st season)
- Captain: C. A. Barlett
- Home stadium: Stuart Field

1918 Big Ten Conference football standings
	Conf.					Overall
Team	W		L		T	W		L		T
Michigan +	2	–	0	–	0	5	–	0	–	0
Illinois +	4	–	0	–	0	5	–	2	–	0
Purdue +	1	–	0	–	0	3	–	3	–	0
Iowa	2	–	1	–	0	6	–	2	–	1
Minnesota	2	–	1	–	0	5	–	2	–	1
Northwestern	1	–	1	–	0	2	–	2	–	1
Wisconsin	1	–	2	–	0	3	–	3	–	0
Indiana	0	–	0	–	0	2	–	2	–	0
Ohio State	0	–	3	–	0	3	–	3	–	0
Chicago	0	–	5	–	0	4	–	6	–	1
$ – Conference champion

The 1918 Purdue Boilermakers football team was an American football team that represented Purdue University during the 1918 Big Ten Conference football season. In their first season under head coach A. G. Scanlon, the Boilermakers compiled a 3–3 record, finished in a tie for first place in the Big Ten Conference with a 1–0 record against conference opponents, and outscored opponents by a total of 87 to 78.

== Schedule ==
Date	Opponent	Site	Result	Attendance	Source
October 26	DePauw*	Stuart Field; West Lafayette, IN	L 7–9		
November 2	Chicago	Stuart Field; West Lafayette, IN (rivalry)	W 7–3		
November 9	at Michigan Agricultural*	Old College Field; East Lansing, MI	W 14–6		
November 16	vs. Wabash*	Washington Park; Indianapolis, IN	W 53–6		
November 23	Notre Dame*	Stuart Field; West Lafayette, IN (rivalry)	L 6–26	7,000	
November 30	at Great Lakes Navy*	Northwestern Field; Evanston, IL	L 0–27		
*Non-conference game

== Preseason ==
On September 10, 1918, Purdue's athletic director, Oliver Cutts, announced that Cleo A. O'Donnell was at his home in Boston and would probably not return as the school's head football coach. Cutts stated that assistant coach Butch Scanlon would take change of the team when students reported.

== Game summaries ==
On October 26, Purdue was upset by DePauw, 9–7, in Lafayette, Indiana. The DePauw team was delayed by a freight wreck that blocked the railroad near Roachdale, with the players traveling the remaining 45 miles in automobiles. The game began at 5 p.m. and was played in shortened quarters. DePauw threw a touchdown pass for the victory with minutes to play in the "gathering darkness."

On November 2, Purdue defeated Chicago, 7–3, at Lafayette. The Purdue victory broke a 20-game losing streak against Chicago dating back to 1898. According to a newspaper account, Chicago's coach Stagg "used everything at his command to put a winning score across, but the plucky Purdue men foiled him."

On November 9, Purdue defeated Michigan Agricultural, 14–6, in Lansing, Michigan. Purdue scored twice in the second quarter, both times on interceptions returned for touchdowns.

On November 16, Purdue defeated Wabash, 53–6, at Washington Park in Indianapolis.

On November 23, Notre Dame defeated Purdue, 26–6, before a crowd of 7,000 at Stuart Field in Lafayette.

On November 30, 1918, the Great Lakes Navy defeated Purdue, 27–0, at Northwestern Field in Evanston, Illinois. Great Lakes led, 6–0, at halftime, but scored 21 points in the third quarter to extend its lead. The 1918 Great Lakes Navy Bluejackets compiled a 3–0–1 record against Big Ten opponents, went on to win the 1919 Rose Bowl, and featured three players (George Halas, Jimmy Conzelman, and Paddy Driscoll) who were later inducted into the Pro Football Hall of Fame.

== Roster ==
- C. A. Bartlett, G
- H. H. Bendixon, E
- Ferdinand Birk, T
- Paul Church, HB
- J. Daly
- R. R. Foresman, HB
- C. E. Hargrove, G
- Bob Markley, RH
- S. C. McIntosh, HB
- John Meeker, RH
- Russ Mitchell, C
- Edgar Murphy, FB
- R. Phillips, G
- J. H. Quast, E
- Fred Roth, HB
- M. M. Smith, E
- C. C. Stanwood, C
- Ed Strubbe, G
- Earl Wagner
- J. R. Waters, HB
- Bob Whipkius, T
