= William R. Cruse =

American football coach

Biographical details
- Born: May 23, 1895; Lockport Township, Michigan, U.S.
- Died: June 23, 1944 (aged 49); Lansing, Michigan, U.S.
- Education: University of Michigan (1919)

Playing career

Football
- 1917–1919: Michigan
- Position: Halfback

Coaching career (HC unless noted)

Football
- 1921: Central (IA)

Basketball
- 1922–1923: Central (IA)

Administrative career (AD unless noted)
- 1921–1923: Central (IA)

Head coaching record
- Overall: 2–2–1 (football); 2–13 (basketball)

Accomplishments and honors

Championships
- National (1918)

William Roy Cruse (May 23, 1895 – June 23, 1944) was an American engineer, college athletics coach, and college administrator. He was the athletic director, head football coach, and basketball coach for Central College in the early 1920s.

A 1919 graduate of the University of Michigan, Cruse was a member of the national championship 1918 Michigan Wolverines football team under Fielding H. Yost as a halfback.

Cruse worked as an engineer for Jackson, Michigan. He later worked as the assistant chief engineer for the Michigan State Highway department. He died on June 23, 1944, after a long illness in his home in Lansing, Michigan.

== Head coaching record ==
=== Football ===
Year	Team	Overall	Conference	Standing	Bowl/playoffs
Central Dutch (Independent) (1921)
1921	Central	2–2–1			
Central:		2–2–1			
Total:		2–2–1			
