= 1918 Northwestern Purple football team =

American college football season

1918 Northwestern Purple football
- Conference: Big Ten Conference
- Record: 2–2–1 (1–1 Big Ten)
- Head coach: Fred J. Murphy (5th season)
- Captain: Gene McLaughlin
- Home stadium: Northwestern Field

1918 Big Ten Conference football standings
	Conf.					Overall
Team	W		L		T	W		L		T
Michigan +	2	–	0	–	0	5	–	0	–	0
Illinois +	4	–	0	–	0	5	–	2	–	0
Purdue +	1	–	0	–	0	3	–	3	–	0
Iowa	2	–	1	–	0	6	–	2	–	1
Minnesota	2	–	1	–	0	5	–	2	–	1
Northwestern	1	–	1	–	0	2	–	2	–	1
Wisconsin	1	–	2	–	0	3	–	3	–	0
Indiana	0	–	0	–	0	2	–	2	–	0
Ohio State	0	–	3	–	0	3	–	3	–	0
Chicago	0	–	5	–	0	4	–	6	–	1
$ – Conference champion

The 1918 Northwestern Purple team was an American football team that represented Northwestern University during the 1918 Big Ten Conference football season. In their fifth and final year under head coach Fred J. Murphy, the Purple compiled a 2–2–1 record (1–1 against Big Ten Conference opponents) and finished in sixth place in the Big Ten Conference.

Northwestern's quarterback Marshall Underhill was selected as a first-team player on the 1918 Big Ten Conference football season.

In response to the Spanish flu pandemic, the football schedule was modified. The game against Ohio State on October 19 was canceled.

== Schedule ==
Date	Opponent	Site	Result	Attendance	Source
October 26	at Great Lakes Navy*	Naval Station Great Lakes; North Chicago, IL	T 0–0	15,000	
November 2	Chicago Naval Reserve*	Northwestern Field; Evanston, IL	L 0–25		
November 9	Knox (IL)*	Northwestern Field; Evanston, IL	W 47–7		
November 16	Chicago	Northwestern Field; Evanston, IL	W 21–6	8,000	
November 23	at Iowa	Iowa Field; Iowa City, IA	L 7–23		
*Non-conference game

== Game summaries ==
On October 26, 1918, Northwestern and Great Lakes Navy played to a scoreless tie before a crowd of 15,000. The game was played in mud that was ankle deep. The 1918 Great Lakes Navy team compiled a 3–0–1 record against Big Ten opponents, went on to win the 1919 Rose Bowl, and featured three players (George Halas, Jimmy Conzelman, and Paddy Driscoll) who were later inducted into the Pro Football Hall of Fame. Charlie Bachman, who was hired as Northwestern's coach after the season and was later inducted into the College Football Hall of Fame, also played for the 1918 Great Lakes team.

On November 2, 1918, Northwestern's S.A.T.C. team lost, 25–0, to |Chicago Naval Reserve a team from the United States Naval Reserve School at Chicago's Municipal Pier. The game was played at Evanston Field.

On November 9, 1918, Northwestern defeated Knox, 47–7. Knox scored on its first drive with a pass covering more than 90 yards. Northwestern then scored seven touchdowns.

On November 16, 1918, Northwestern defeated Chicago, 21–6, in the rain, fog, and mud before a crowd of 8,000 at Evanston Field.

On November 23, 1918, Iowa defeated Northwestern, 23–7, in Iowa City.
