= 1918 Iowa Hawkeyes football team =

American college football season

1918 Iowa Hawkeyes football
- Conference: Big Ten Conference
- Record: 6–2 (2–1 Big Ten)
- Head coach: Howard Jones (3rd season)
- Offensive scheme: Single-wing
- Captain: Ronald Reed
- Home stadium: Iowa Field

Uniform
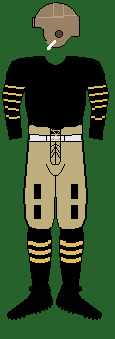

1918 Big Ten Conference football standings
	Conf.					Overall
Team	W		L		T	W		L		T
Michigan +	2	–	0	–	0	5	–	0	–	0
Illinois +	4	–	0	–	0	5	–	2	–	0
Purdue +	1	–	0	–	0	3	–	3	–	0
Iowa	2	–	1	–	0	6	–	2	–	1
Minnesota	2	–	1	–	0	5	–	2	–	1
Northwestern	1	–	1	–	0	2	–	2	–	1
Wisconsin	1	–	2	–	0	3	–	3	–	0
Indiana	0	–	0	–	0	2	–	2	–	0
Ohio State	0	–	3	–	0	3	–	3	–	0
Chicago	0	–	5	–	0	4	–	6	–	1
$ – Conference champion

The 1918 Iowa Hawkeyes football team was an American football team that represented the University of Iowa in the 1918 Big Ten Conference football season. In their third season under head coach Howard Jones, the Hawkeyes compiled a 6–2 (2–1 against Big Ten opponents) and finished in a tie for fourth place in the conference.

Iowa end Robert Reed and guard Harry Hunzelman received first-team All-Big Ten honors. African-American tackle Duke Slater also made his debut as a freshman for the 1918 Iowa team.

== Schedule ==
Date	Opponent	Site	Result	Attendance	Source
September 28	Great Lakes Navy*	Iowa Field; Iowa City, IA	L 0–10	4,000	
October 5	Nebraska*	Nebraska Field; Lincoln, NE (rivalry)	W 12–0		
October 12	Coe*	Iowa Field; Iowa City, IA	W 27–0		
October 19	Cornell (IA)*	Iowa Field; Iowa City, IA	W 34–0		
November 2	Illinois	Iowa Field; Iowa City, IA	L 0–19		
November 9	Minnesota^{†}	Iowa Field; Iowa City, IA (rivalry)	W 6–0	5,000	
November 16	Iowa State*	Iowa Field; Iowa City, IA (rivalry)	W 21–0		
November 23	Northwestern	Iowa Field; Iowa City, IA	W 23–7		
November 30	at Camp Dodge*	Johnston, IA	T 0–0		
*Non-conference game; ^{†}Homecoming

== Game summaries ==
On September 28, 1918, Iowa lost to Great Lakes Navy team, 10–0, before a crowd of 4,000 in Iowa City. Walter Eckersall in the Chicago Tribune called it "one of the best early games seen in the west in the last decade." The 1918 Great Lakes Navy Bluejackets football team compiled a 3–0–1 record against Big Ten opponents, went on to win the 1919 Rose Bowl, and featured three players (George Halas, Jimmy Conzelman, and Paddy Driscoll) who were later inducted into the Pro Football Hall of Fame. Charlie Bachman, who was hired as Northwestern's coach after the season and was later inducted into the College Football Hall of Fame, also played for the 1918 Great Lakes team.

On October 5, 1918, Iowa defeated Nebraska, 12–0, in Lincoln, Nebraska. After a scoreless first half, Iowa scored two touchdowns in the third quarter. The victory was the first for an Iowa team over a Nebraska team since 1899.

On October 12, 1918, Iowa defeated Coe College, 27–0, in Iowa City. The game was played before members of Iowa's Student Army Training Corps only. The game was canceled but then put back on schedule early on the day of the game.

On October 19, 1918, Iowa defeated Cornell (IA), 34–0.

On November 2, 1918, Illinois defeated Iowa, 19–0, at Iowa City. Illinois scored touchdowns in the second, third, and fourth quarters. The Des Moines Register credited Illinois' victory to "perfectly executed forward passes and machinelike teamwork."

On November 9, 1918, Iowa defeated the Minnesota S.A.T.C. team, 6–0, in Iowa City. The victory was Iowa's first in the Iowa–Minnesota football rivalry, having lost 12 consecutive games dating back to 1891. Iowa's touchdown was scored in the third quarter after fullback Fred Lohman threw a pass from his own 23-yard line that was caught by William Donnelly and taken to Minnesota's four-yard line. Lohman scored the winning touchdown three plays later.

On November 16, 1918, Iowa defeated Iowa State, 21–0, in Iowa City. Neither team scored in the first half, but Iowa scored one touchdown in the third quarter and two in the fourth quarter. Fullback Fred Lohman returned a punt 80 yards to set the stage for one of Iowa's touchdowns. The crowd was reported to be the smallest ever to watch an Iowa–Iowa State football rivalry to that point in time.

On November 23, 1918, Iowa defeated Northwestern, 23-7, in Iowa City.

On November 30, 1918, Iowa and Camp Dodge played to a scoreless tie before a small crowd at Drake Stadium in Des Moines.
