= Fred Hendershot =

American football player and coach (1895–1977)

Biographical details
- Born: April 25, 1895; Dighton, Michigan, U.S.
- Died: October 11, 1977 (aged 82); Tecumseh, Michigan, U.S.

Playing career

Football
- 1918: Michigan
- Position: End

Coaching career (HC unless noted)

Football
- 1919: Baldwin–Wallace

Basketball
- 1919–1920: Baldwin–Wallace

Head coaching record
- Overall: 0–8 (football); 5–13 (basketball)

Accomplishments and honors

Championships
- National (1918)

Fred E. Hendershot Sr. (April 25, 1895 – October 11, 1977) was an American football player and coach. He served as the head football coach at Baldwin–Wallace College—now known as Baldwin Wallace University—in Berea, Ohio in 1919, compiling a record of 0–8. He also served as the school's head men's basketball coach during the 1919–20 season, tallying a mark of 5–13.

== Head coaching record ==
=== Football ===
Year	Team	Overall	Conference	Standing	Bowl/playoffs
Baldwin–Wallace Yellow Jackets (Ohio Athletic Conference) (1919)
1919	Baldwin–Wallace	0–8	0–5	T–13th	
Baldwin–Wallace:		0–8	0–5		
Total:		0–8			
