= 1918 Michigan Wolverines football team =

American college football season

1918 Michigan Wolverines football
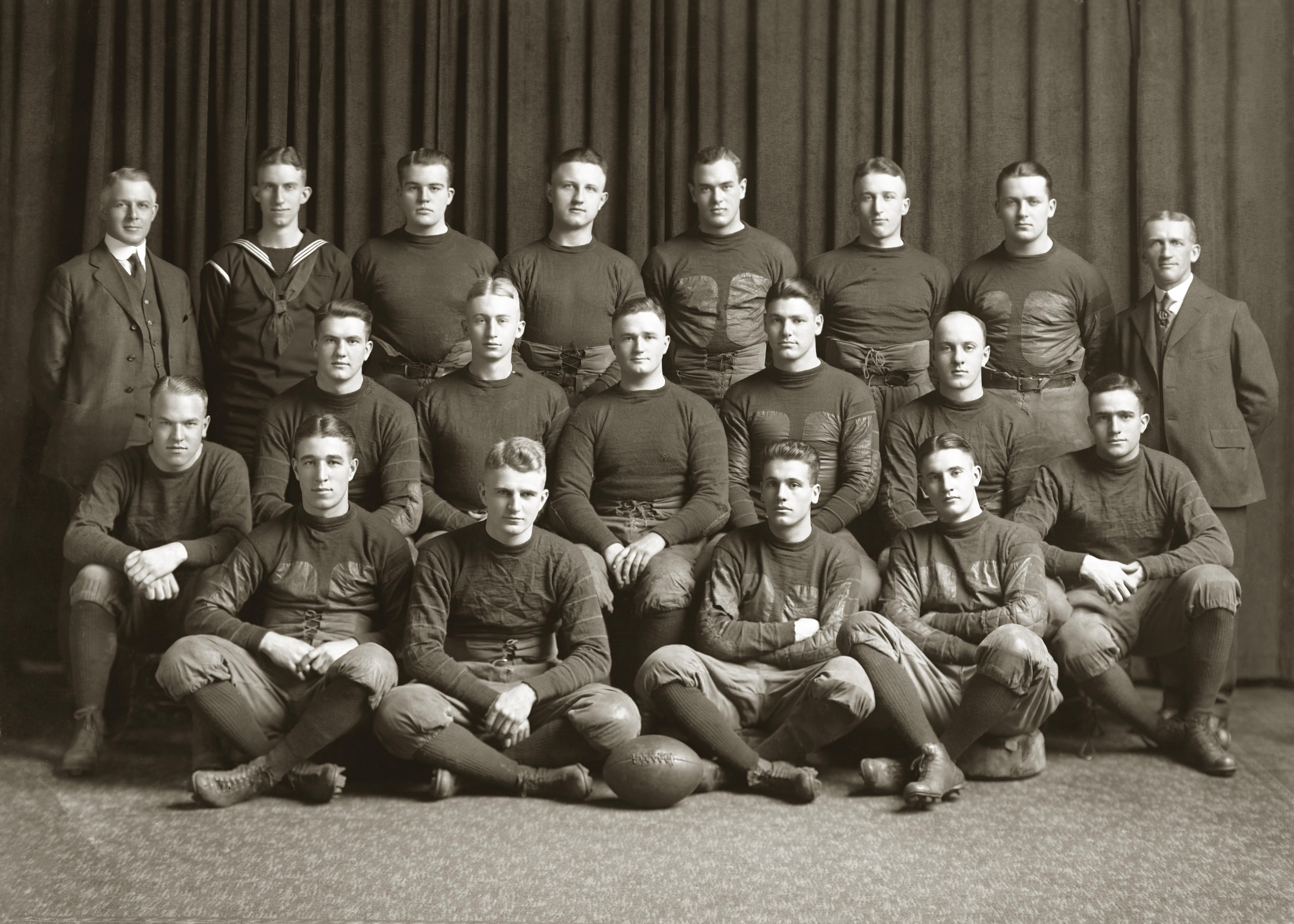

National champion (Billingsley) Co-national champion (NCF) Big Ten co-champion
- Conference: Big Ten Conference
- Record: 5–0 (2–0 Big Ten)
- Head coach: Fielding H. Yost (18th season)
- Captain: Tad Wieman
- Home stadium: Ferry Field

Uniform
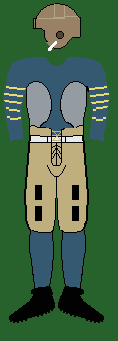

1918 Big Ten Conference football standings
	Conf.					Overall
Team	W		L		T	W		L		T
Michigan +	2	–	0	–	0	5	–	0	–	0
Illinois +	4	–	0	–	0	5	–	2	–	0
Purdue +	1	–	0	–	0	3	–	3	–	0
Iowa	2	–	1	–	0	6	–	2	–	1
Minnesota	2	–	1	–	0	5	–	2	–	1
Northwestern	1	–	1	–	0	2	–	2	–	1
Wisconsin	1	–	2	–	0	3	–	3	–	0
Indiana	0	–	0	–	0	2	–	2	–	0
Ohio State	0	–	3	–	0	3	–	3	–	0
Chicago	0	–	5	–	0	4	–	6	–	1
$ – Conference champion

The 1918 Michigan Wolverines football team represented the University of Michigan in the 1918 Big Ten Conference football season. The team's head football coach was Fielding H. Yost in his 18th season with the program. The 1918 team played in a season shortened by World War I travel restrictions and the 1918 flu pandemic. They shared the Big Ten Conference championship with Illinois and finished with a perfect record of 5–0, outscoring opponents 96 to 6. Although no formal mechanism existed in 1918 to select a national champion, the 1918 Michigan team was retroactively selected as the national champion by the Billingsley Report and a co-national champion with Pittsburgh by the National Championship Foundation. The Wolverines played their home games at Ferry Field.

Fullback Frank Steketee was selected by Walter Camp as a first-team All-American and was one of the top kickers in the game during the 1918 season. Center Ernie Vick and left tackle Angus Goetz were both selected as first-team All-Big Ten players.

== Schedule ==
Date	Opponent	Site	Result	Attendance
October 5	Case*	Ferry Field; Ann Arbor, MI	W 33–0	
November 9	at Chicago	Stagg Field; Chicago, IL (rivalry)	W 13–0	8,000
November 16	Syracuse*	Ferry Field; Ann Arbor, MI	W 15–0	
November 23	Michigan Agricultural*^{†}	Ferry Field; Ann Arbor, MI (rivalry)	W 21–6	15,000
November 30	at Ohio State	Ohio Field; Columbus, OH (rivalry)	W 14–0	7,000
*Non-conference game; ^{†}Homecoming

== Preseason ==
In 1918, the United States was embroiled in World War I. Many University of Michigan students, including athletes, were serving in the military. Team captain Tad Wieman did not play during the 1918 season as he had enlisted in the Aviation Corps. Halfback Eddie Usher was also taken into active military service after the first game of the season.

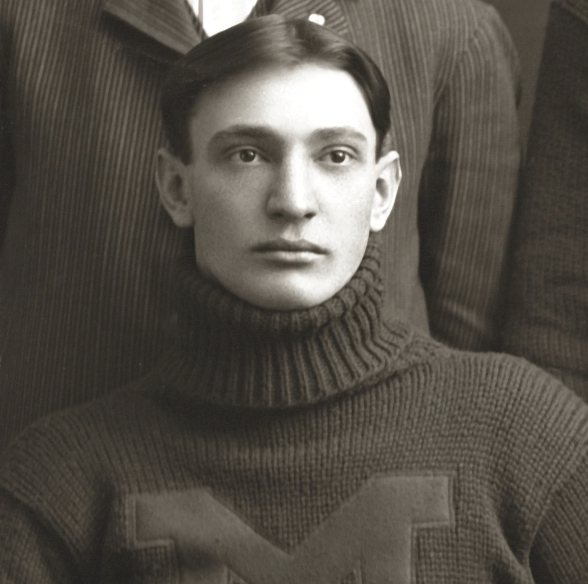
Curtis Redden's letter from the front was published before the start of the 1918 season.

Three former Michigan football players were killed in the war. One of the casualties was Curtis Redden, star end of Fielding Yost's "Point-a-Minute" teams. In April 1918, newspapers published a letter from Redden to a friend back home describing his unit's "baptism of fire":

"And so it went from day to day, but oftimes the nights were very bad. At night, when the infantry launched its raids, or the enemy his, or the infantry became nervous and called for help, the guns stamped like stallions and snorted their breaths of fire. The blackness of the night became a series of dots and dashes, until the world resembled a vast radio station, spelling hell, hell, and hell again. To this must be added the shriek of shells, the whistle of fragments, the automatic hammer effect of the machine gun, the rattle of the rifle fire, the rockets and star shells out over No Man's land—all combined to make the night weird, hideous, fascinating, sublime."

The Michigan Alumnus published a letter from another Michigan athlete, Cecil F. Cross, recalling memories of football in Ann Arbor:

"The autumn is approaching here. The days are getting shorter and there is a chill in the air ... It seems to bring back the old feeling which is experienced where the smell of football is in the air, the first cold days of autumn and it makes me homesick, though only slightly. Ralph Henning, of Bay City, is here, and though we come from different parts of Michigan and attended different schools, he being the captain of the Michigan Aggies' football team in 1916, we quite frequently talk over the old scenes with which we are both familiar. He, too, has mentioned the feeling of football in the air. If they were to train an army of football players and throw them into the lines, the last weeks of October, with Coach Yost to address them just before the battle, we would score a touchdown the first half, and before Thanksgiving we would have pushed the Germans under their own goal posts and eat dinner in Berlin."

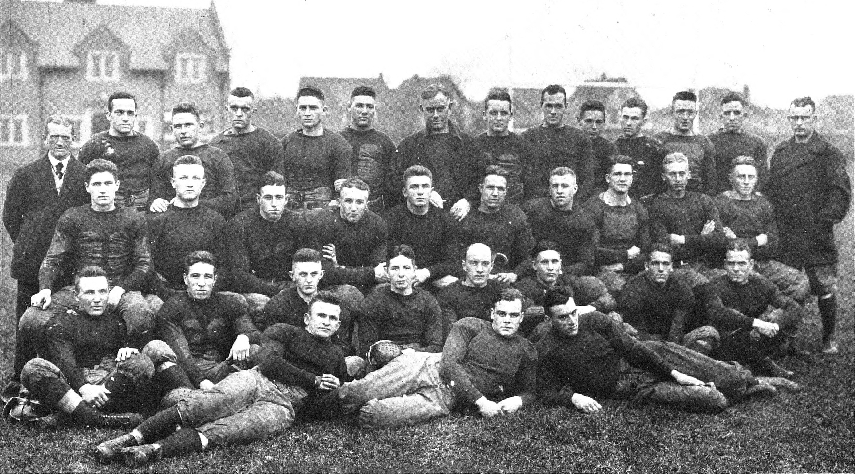
1918 Michigan football team (full squad) on Ferry Field.

Before the football season began, a rumor spread that football would be abandoned for 1918. The university decided to proceed with the football season, though war-time restrictions limited travel and practice time. To compensate for the players serving in the military, the existing prohibition on freshman players was lifted for the year.

As originally adopted, Michigan's 1918 schedule included games against Cornell (at Ithaca), Northwestern (at Ann Arbor) and Minnesota (at Ann Arbor). Those games, and planned replacement games against Camp Custer and the University of Mount Union, were canceled. Travel restrictions resulted in cancellation of the Cornell and Minnesota games, and the 1918 flu pandemic forced the cancellation or rescheduling of other games. After Cornell canceled its game, Syracuse was put on the schedule in its place.

== Game summaries ==
=== Michigan 33, Case 0 ===
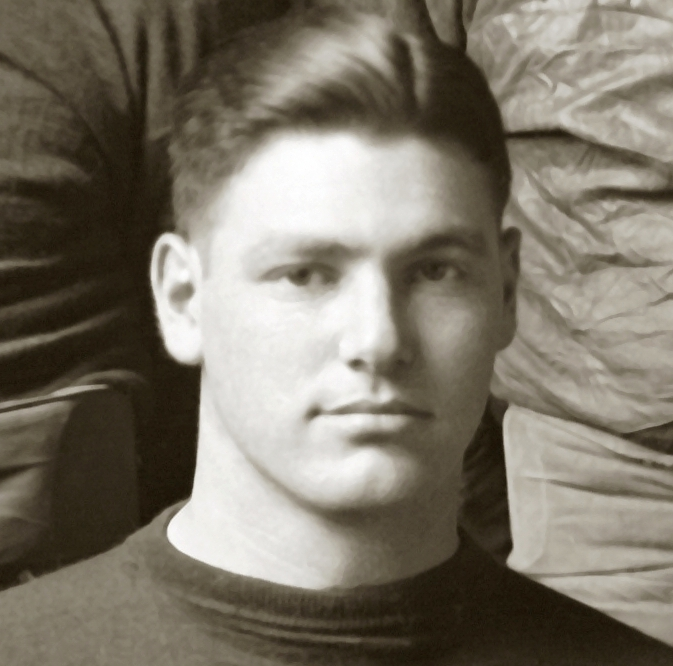
Halfback Abe Cohn was "an eye opener" against Case, requiring "two or three men" to stop him.

Michigan opened its season on October 7, 1918, with a home game against the Case Scientific School (now Case Western Reserve University) from Cleveland. Michigan came into the game with only two players (Angus Goetz and Abe Cohn) who had ever played for Michigan previously. Despite facing a Case team that returned seven letterman from 1917, head coach Fielding H. Yost expressed confidence in a pre-game interview: "I haven't had a scrimmage since Monday, but the team looks like it ought to go pretty good. Conditions are fair for a good game, and I expect one."

Michigan won easily by a score of 33–0, but the Detroit Free Press noted that the inexperienced team "played a ragged game," albeit showing "promise of development into a smooth playing machine." Cress, playing at center, was credited with playing "the best defensive game of any man on Ferry Field," and John Perrin was reported to have made "a splendid showing." The Detroit Free Press called Abe Cohn "an eye opener" as a ground gainer and noted: "He made a gain practically every time he was given the ball and, when he was stopped, it always took two or three men to turn the trick." Edward Usher tore ligaments in his ankle while running with the ball and had to be taken out of the game. Freshman Frank Steketee entered the game as a substitute and made an impressive debut; he accounted for 21 points, "making three of the five touchdowns and kicking three out of five attempts at goal."

Michigan's starting line-up against Case, as announced the day before the game, was Fletcher (left end), Clash (left tackle), Goetz (left guard), Cress (center), Freeman (right guard), Lent (right tackle), Dunne (right end), Walker (quarterback), Cohn (right halfback), Perrin (left halfback) and Usher (fullback).

=== Michigan 13, Chicago 0 ===
Michigan at Chicago

Team	1	2	3	4	Total
• Wolverines	7	0	0	6	13
Maroons	0	0	0	0	0

- Date: November 9
- Location: Stagg Field
  Chicago, IL

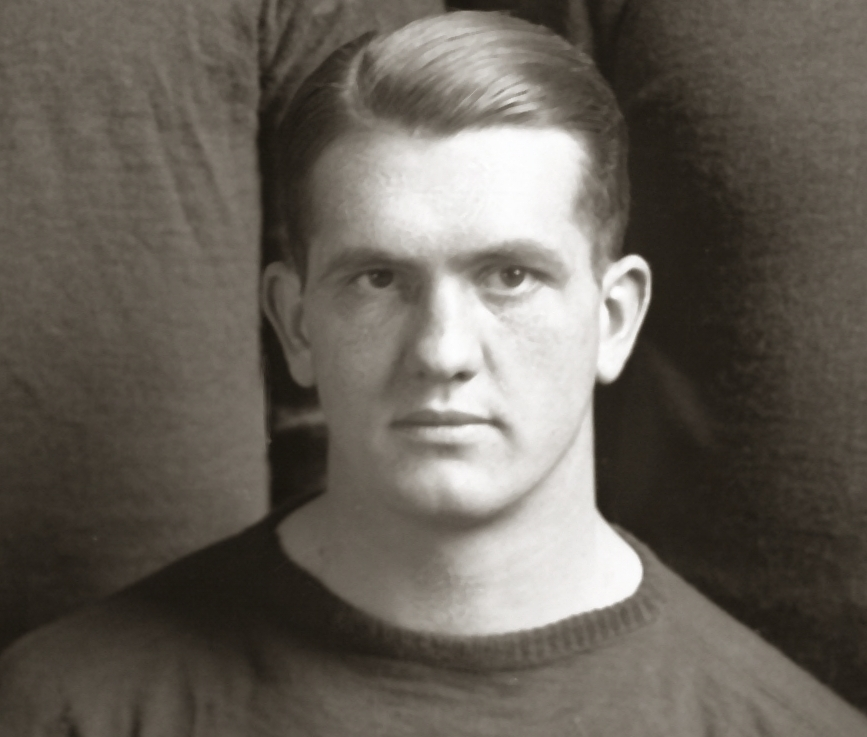
Angus Goetz blocked a punt and returned it 55 yards for a touchdown against Chicago.

After its season opener against Case, the Michigan team was idle for more than a month as games with Camp Custer and Mt. Union College were canceled, and the game against Michigan Agricultural College postponed, due to the influenza pandemic. On November 9, 1918, the team resumed play with a game against Amos Alonzo Stagg's Chicago Maroons at Stagg Field in Chicago. The two teams, which had been one another's principal rivals from 1890 to 1905, had not met for 13 years. In the prior meeting, Chicago had defeated Michigan 2–0, breaking a 56-game undefeated streak by the Wolverines. The game was played as negotiations were underway to end World War I, and the Chicago Daily Tribune wrote: "While the nations of the world are hoping for an armistice, the resumption of hostilities between forces guided by Gens. Yost and Stagg brought joy to thousands of football fans, and the opening battle attracted approximately 7,000 of them."

The game began at 2:30 pm Despite fumbles by Cohn and Knode early in the game, Michigan held on defense. After Knode's fumble, Chicago's Stegman attempted a dropkick from the 45-yard line, but Goetz broke through the Chicago line and blocked the kick. Goetz picked it up and returned it 55 yards for a touchdown. Steketee kicked the extra point, and Michigan led 7–0. The third quarter ended with Michigan driving deep in Chicago territory at the seven-yard line. On the first play of the fourth quarter, Perrin was stopped at the one-yard line on a run up the middle from a fake punt formation. On the next play, Perrin ran for the touchdown. Steketee missed the extra point, and Michigan led 13–0.

Michigan's starting lineup was Dunne (left end), Goetz (left tackle), Adams (left guard), Vick (center), Freeman (right guard), Morrison (right tackle), Karpus (right end), Knode (quarterback), Perrin (left halfback), Cohn (right halfback) and Steketee (fullback).

=== Michigan 15, Syracuse 0 ===
Syracuse at Michigan

Team	1	2	3	4	Total
Orange	0	0	0	0	0
• Wolverines	0	6	0	9	15

- Date: November 16
- Location: Ferry Field
  Ann Arbor, MI

On November 16, 1918, five days after the signing of the Armistice marking the end of hostilities in Europe, Michigan defeated Syracuse 16–0. The game was played in pouring rain at Ferry Field. Both teams failed to score in the first quarter, as Michigan fullback Frank Steketee missed a field goal from the 25-yard line on one drive and Knode fumbled at the Syracuse five-yard line to end another drive. Cohn and Vick both intercepted passes in the second quarter. After Knode made a fair catch on a punt and Syracuse was penalized for offsides, Steketee kicked a field goal from the 36-yard line to give Michigan a 3–0 lead. Michigan's next possession mirrored its last, as the ball was placed on Syracuse's 35-yard line after a roughing penalty was called against Syracuse for interfering with Knode as he attempted a fair catch of a punt at the 40-yard line. Steketee kicked his second field goal from the spot to give Michigan a 6–0 lead at halftime.

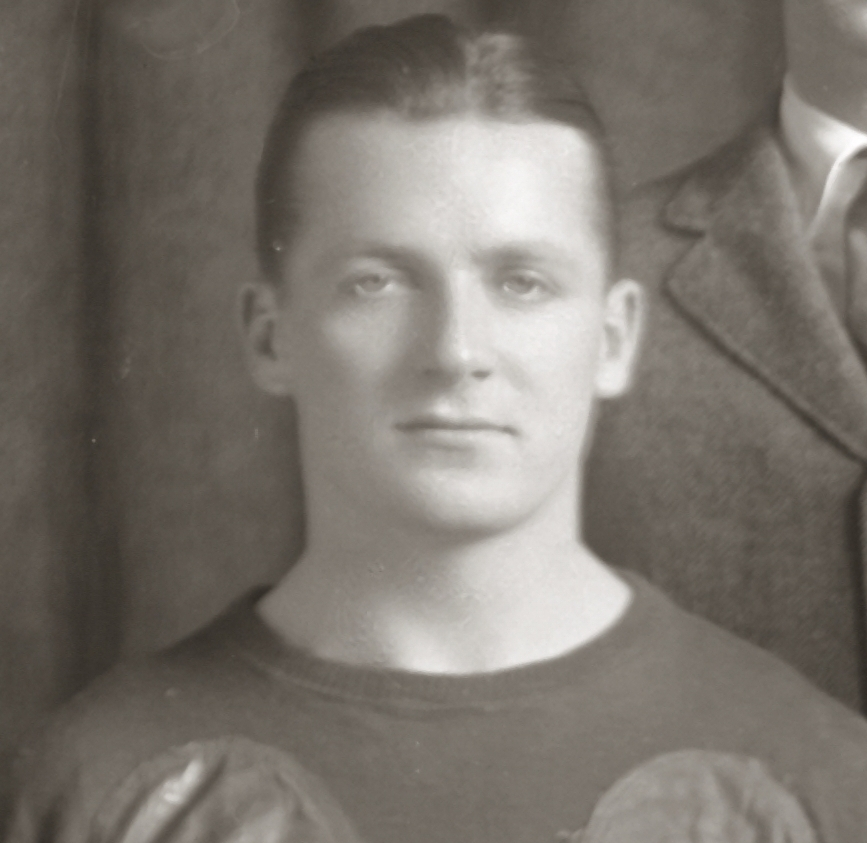
All-American fullback Frank Steketee scored all 15 points in Michigan's victory over Syracuse.

In the third quarter, Steketee missed a field goal from the 32-yard line. In the fourth quarter, Vick and Knode both intercepted pass. Vick's interception stopped a Syracuse drive at Michigan's 15-yard line, and Knode's interception gave Michigan the ball at the Syracuse 21-yard line. After advancing the ball to the 14-yard line, Steketee added a third field goal to give Michigan a 9–0 lead. Later in the fourth quarter, Steketee intercepted a pass and returned it 20 yards for a touchdown. Steketee missed the extra point, and Michigan led 15–0.

Steketee scored all 15 points in Michigan's win over Syracuse and received national media attention for his performance. In the Detroit Free Press, Harry Bullion wrote: "One man stood above all the rest in this sparkling triumph of the Wolverines. They'll be singing the praises of Steketee long after he trods the campus for the last time. All of the points assembled by Michigan are attributed to the educated toe and agility of Yost's brilliant fullback." The Syracuse Herald reported: "One man stood out in the Michigan triumph, Steketee of Grand Rapids. He made the entire 15 points scored by his team and otherwise mussed up perfect good intentions on the part of the visitors."

The victory over Syracuse also enhanced Michigan's reputation, as Syracuse and Pittsburgh had been viewed as the most powerful teams in the East. The Michiganensian called the Syracuse game "the best contest of the year" against the strongest team in the East and noted: "From the very first moment of play to final blowing of the whistle, the contest was one of the prettiest exhibitions of football ability that has been seen on Ferry Field."

Michigan's starting lineup was Dunne (left end), Goetz (left tackle), Adams (left guard), Vick (center), Freeman (right guard), Young (right tackle), Morrison (right end), Knode (quarterback), Perrin (left halfback), Cohn (right halfback) and Steketee (fullback).

=== Michigan 21, Michigan Agricultural 6 ===
M.A.C. at Michigan

Team	1	2	3	4	Total
Aggies	0	0	0	6	6
• Wolverines	0	14	7	0	21

- Date: November 23
- Location: Ferry Field
  Ann Arbor, MI

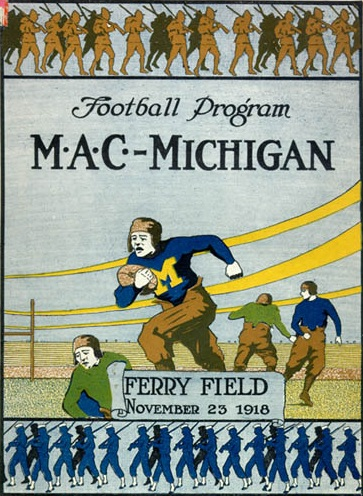
1918 M.A.C. program

On November 23, 1918, Michigan played its fourth game against Michigan Agricultural College (now known as Michigan State University). The game was played at Ferry Field in front of the largest crowd of the season estimated at between 10,000 and 20,000. Followers of both schools attended in large numbers, "the maize and blue of Michigan and the green and white of M.A.C. decorating the stands the length and breadth of them." The Aggies in 1918 had a new head coach, George Gauthier, and a highly touted African-American running back, Harry Graves. The Aggies had defeated Knute Rockne's Notre Dame the previous week in East Lansing.

After a scoreless first quarter, Michigan scored two touchdowns in the second quarter. Right halfback Abe Cohn scored Michigan's first touchdown on a two-yard run. Left tackle Angus Goetz scored the second touchdown after Graves fumbled a forward pass. Goetz recovered the fumble and ran it back for a touchdown. Quarterback Knode scored Michigan's final touchdown in the third quarter on a 30-yard run after faking a pass. Steketee converted all three extra points.

Michigan's line was given credit for stopping the Aggies' running attack. The Detroit Free Press reported that M.A.C.'s "vaunted stars", including Harry Graves (described as "the colored boy of whom so much was expected"), were unable to assert themselves. "Superiority of the Michigan line was the rock upon which the Aggies split. M.A.C. showed a fast backfield that might have created endless trouble, but it got little support from the forwards, who were cracked open to let the Wolverines surge through and flatten the runner."

The start of the game was delayed by lengthy pre-game ceremonies featuring the French Blue Devils, performances by the U. of M. army and navy bands and the M.A.C. bands, parades by the Students' Army Training Corps and Naval Units, and a fly-over by former Michigan football captain Pat Smith in his aeroplane. Because of the delay, the game was concluded in darkness. The Aggies took advantage of the darkness late in the game by unleashing a passing attack. The Aggies scored late in the game, "as the darkness already had begun to enshroud the playing field," on a pass from Archer to Schwei. The Detroit Free Press reported: "But for the review of the service corps and the ceremonies attending there hardly would have been an Aggie score."

After the game, sports writer Harry Bullion wrote in the Detroit Free Press: "M.A.C.'s defeat is nothing for her to be ashamed of. It simply was a case of a better-conditioned and smarter eleven overpowering another that, though it lacked nothing in the way of fight that its enemy possessed, failed to cope with the superior knowledge of the game that was Michigan's by right of judgment and the attending conditions."

Michigan's starting lineup was Dunne (left end), Goetz (left tackle), Adams (left guard), Vick (center), Freeman (right guard), Fortune (right tackle), Boville (right end), Knode (quarterback), Cohn (left halfback), Perrin (right halfback) and Steketee (fullback).

=== Michigan 14, Ohio State 0 ===
Michigan at Ohio State

Team	1	2	3	4	Total
• Wolverines	0	0	0	14	14
Buckeyes	0	0	0	0	0

- Date: November 30
- Location: Ohio Field
  Columbus, OH

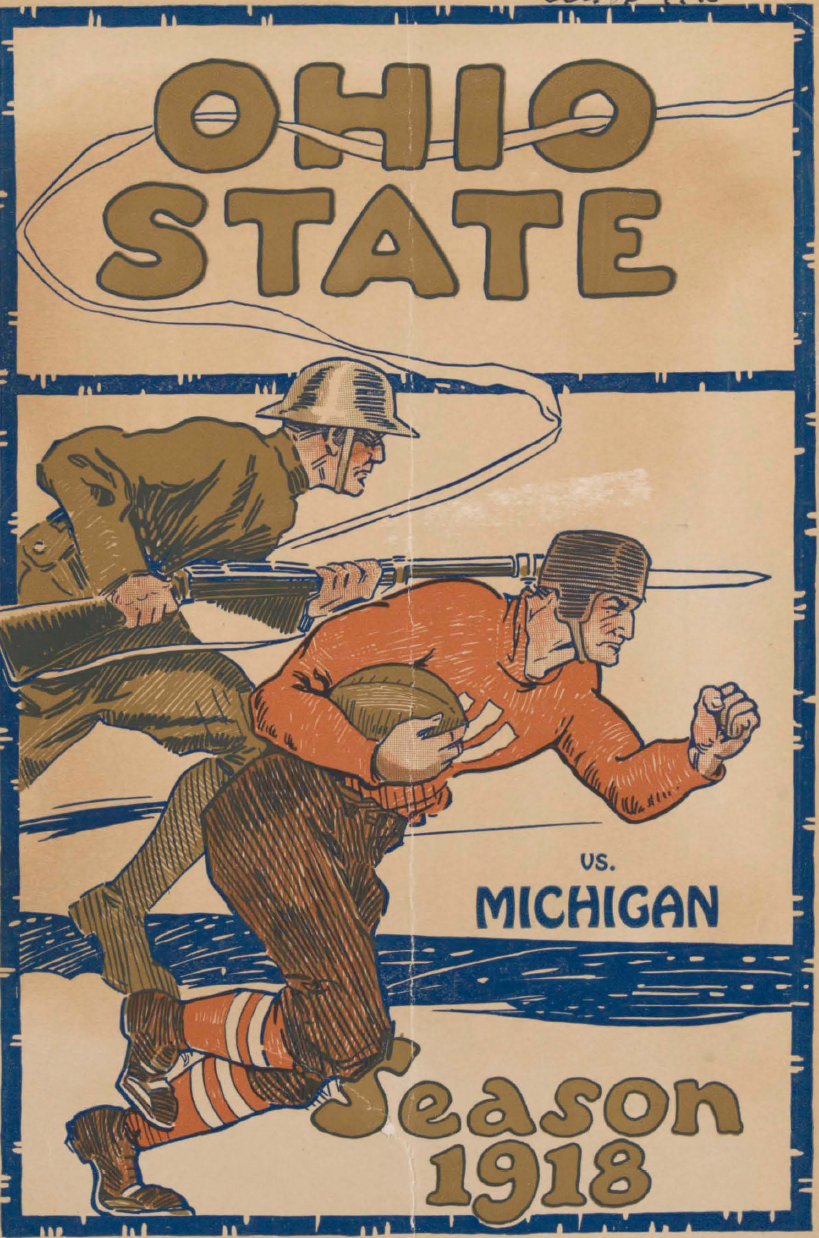
1918 Ohio State program

For its fifth game, Michigan traveled to Columbus to play Ohio State. The game presented an opportunity for Michigan to lay claim to the Big Ten Conference championship. Illinois had previously beaten Ohio State by a 13–0 margin, and Michigan supporters hoped that a greater margin of victory would allow the Wolverines to prove themselves superior to the Illini. Michigan did not achieve the large margin it had hoped for, but won the game 14–0, scoring one point more than Illinois.

The game was played on a wet and slippery field that handicapped the offensive players. The Detroit Free Press reported that players had difficulty untracking themselves in "the mire that lay over the gridiron like custard." The teams played to a scoreless tie in a first half that featured a punting duel between Steketee and Rife. Michigan's first touchdown was set up by a 73-yard punt from Steketee that "stuck fast in the mud" at Ohio State's two- or three-yard line. Michigan's defense held, and Rife was forced to punt from his end zone. In the outstanding play of the game, Goetz blocked the punt and recovered it in the end zone for a touchdown. The Detroit Free Press described the key play as follows:

"The pass from center was perfect and there seemed to be no fear that Rife would not get it away. But Goetz, one man who has starred in every game the Maize and Blue played this year, shattered the line and rammed the Buckeye punter. Leather and Goetz collided and the pigskin went bounding away with Goetz in hot pursuit. Three scarlet-robed athletes tried to block Goetz's path to the ball, but he thrust them aside and went to earth with it just as his rivals in the race catapulted themselves at the leather."

Later in the quarter, with the ball at Ohio State's 28-yard line, Steketee faked a run around the end and passed to Dunne who was "camped near the uprights." Steketee kicked both extra points to give Michigan a 14–0 margin. Michigan had an earlier touchdown called back in the third quarter when the head linesman ruled that Knode had stepped out of bounds on a long run.

Michigan's starting lineup was Dunne (left end), Goetz (left tackle), Fortune (left guard), Vick (center), Freeman (right guard), Czysz (right tackle), Bovill (right end), Knode (quarterback), Perrin (left halfback), Cohn (right halfback) and Steketee (fullback).

== Postseason ==
The team finished the season with a 5–0 record and outscored opponents 96 to 6, allowing only a single touchdown all season. Though Illinois had two non-conference losses, it finished with a 4–0 record in Big Ten play, resulting in a shared conference championship between Michigan and Illinois. Although no formal mechanism existed in 1918 to select a national champion, several organizations recognized by the NCAA have developed systems to identify "national champions" for past seasons. Two of those organizations, the Billingsley Report and the National Championship Foundation, selected Michigan as a national championship team for 1918.

=== Dispute over Big Ten championship ===
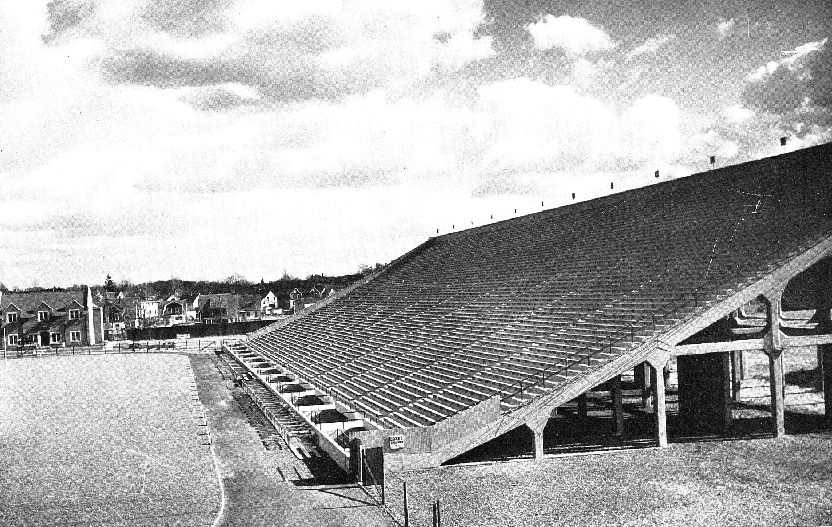
South Stand at Ferry Field, 1918

The 1918 season was Michigan's first season in the Big Ten Conference following its withdrawal in 1906. Due to the cancellation of games against Minnesota and Northwestern, Michigan played only two games against Big Ten opponents, Chicago and Ohio State. Illinois, which had lost a non-conference game, but finished 4–0 against Big Ten opponents, declined Michigan's invitation to meet in a post-season game to decide the championship. The Detroit Free Press chided Illinois for refusing the match:

"[Illinois athletic director] Huff's explanation was as humorous as it was disappointing. He attempted to excuse Illinois on the grounds that the weather in December would be too cold for a game and for that reason there could be no meeting. ... the fact remains that it couldn't be too cold for Michigan, whose players have the same number of arms and legs and a covering of skin no thicker than the athletes who disport themselves under the colors of the Illini."

Some sources refer to Illinois and Michigan as co-champions in 1918. However, at the time, the question of conference supremacy was contested. The following excerpt from Michigan's 1919 yearbook outlines the opposing arguments: "Eastern critics were of the opinion that the Maize and Blue team was rightfully entitled to claim the honors, but western writers held that since Illinois played four Conference games, all of which went to them, they should hold the honors. Despite the fact that they were beaten once by the Municipal Pier Service team of Chicago, and although Michigan had lost no games, the opinion of the western critics could not be changed."

=== Honors ===
Fullback Frank Steketee, who scored all 15 points in Michigan's victory over Syracuse, was the only Michigan player selected as a first-team All-American. Left tackle Angus Goetz won All-Big Ten Conference honors after scoring touchdowns off fumble recoveries and a blocked punt against Chicago, Michigan Agricultural and Ohio State. Center Ernie Vick also won All-Big Ten honors and played so well on defense that Fielding Yost called him "a second [Germany] Schultz." Quarterback Kenneth Knode, "though not a brilliant player individually," was credited with piloting the team with "fine judgment."

== Players ==
=== Letter winners ===
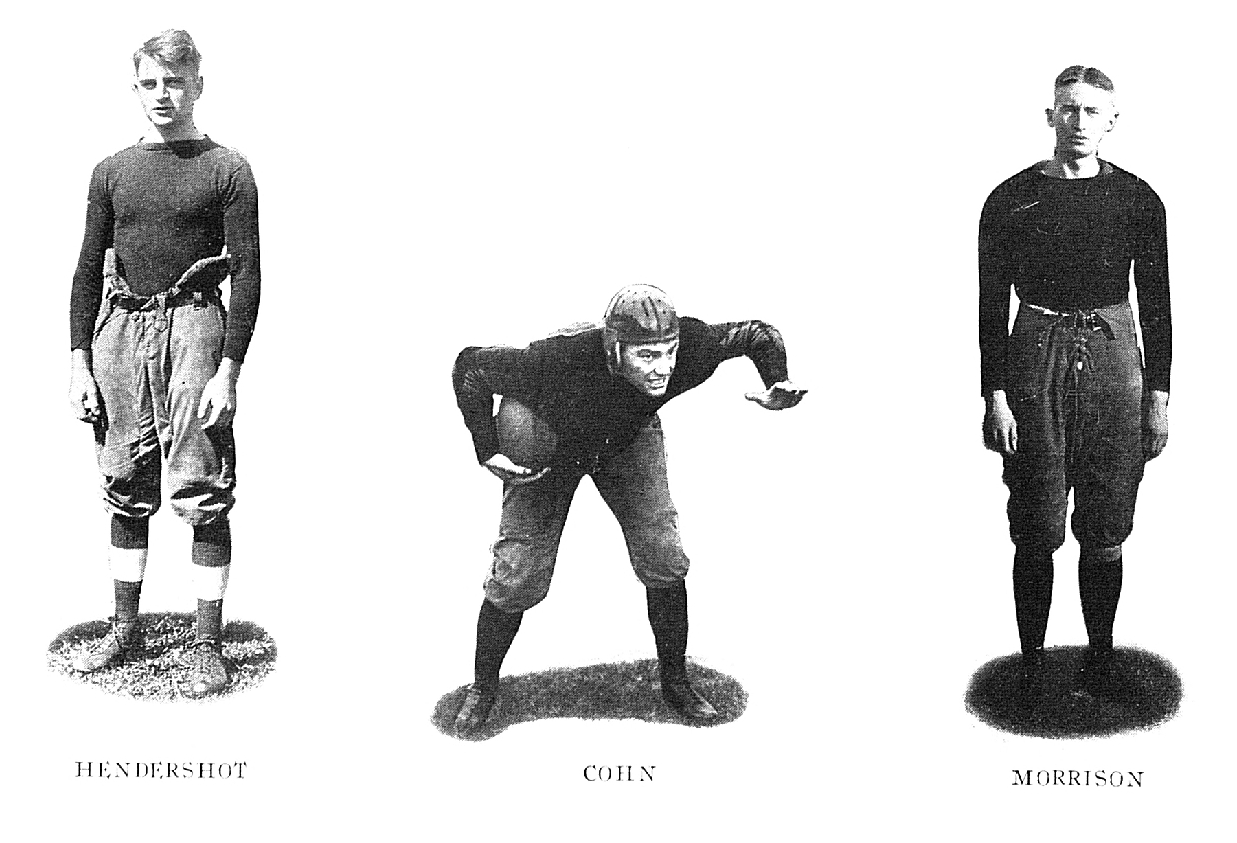
Photographs of Fred Hendershot, Abe Cohn and Chester Morrison from the 1919 Michiganensian.

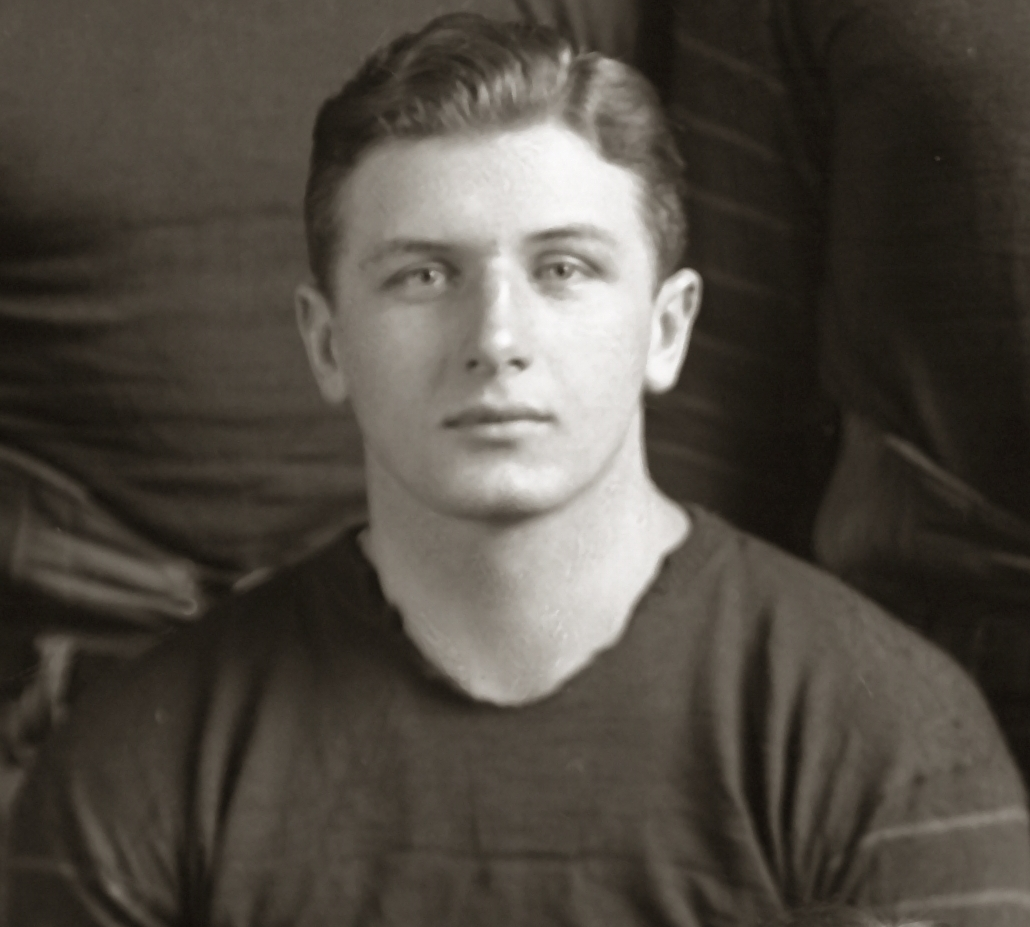
Center Ernie Vick was inducted into the College Football Hall of Fame.

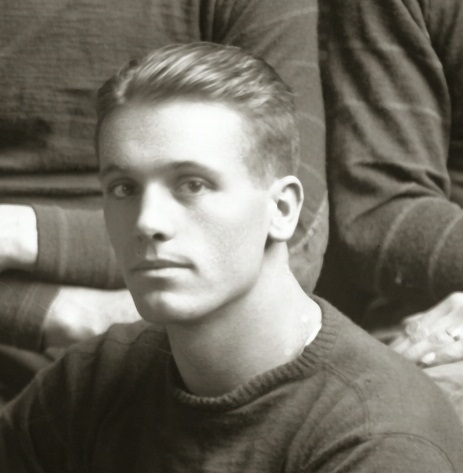
Quarterback Kenneth Knode later played Major League Baseball.

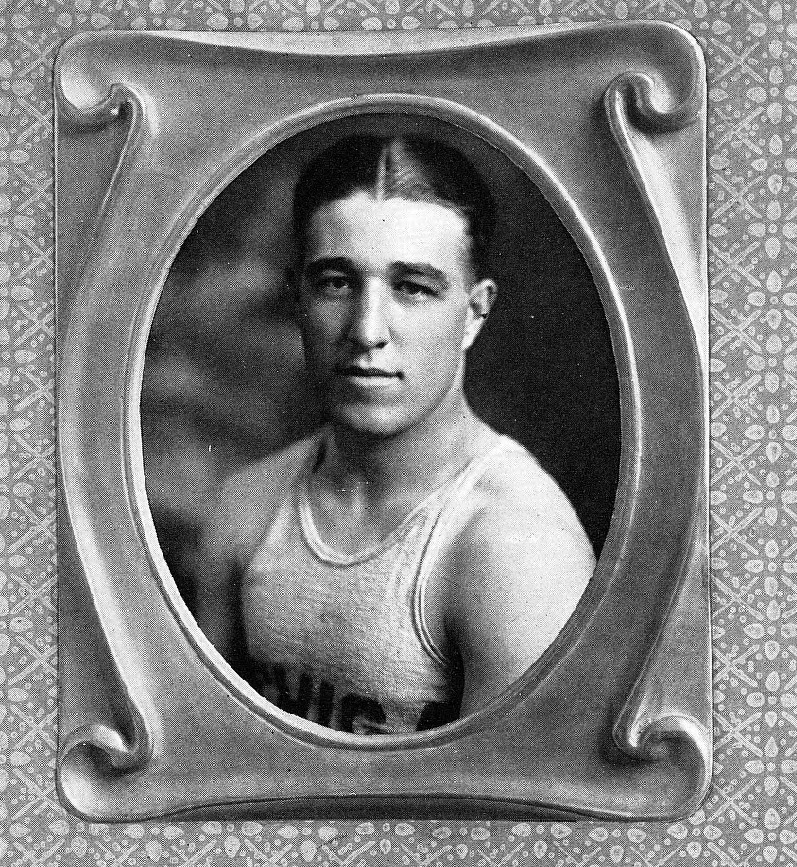
Arthur Karpus was also captain of Michigan's 1921 basketball team.

The following 18 players from Michigan's 1918 football team won varsity letter M's. Names of players who started at least three games are in bold.

- Theodore "Theo" Adams: started 3 games at guard, Ann Arbor, Michigan
- Theodore G. "Ted" Boville: started 2 games at end, Detroit, Michigan
- Abe Cohn: started 5 games at halfback, Spokane, Washington
- William R. Cruse: halfback, Detroit, Michigan
- Francis T. "Frank" Czysz (1899–1971): started 1 game at tackle, Dunkirk, New York
- **Robert J. Dunne** (1899–1980): started 5 games at end, Chicago, Illinois
- William Fortune: started 1 game at guard and 1 game at tackle, Springfield, Illinois
- Paul J. Freeman: started all 5 games at right guard, Great Falls, Montana
- **Angus Goetz** (1897–1977): started 4 games at tackle, 1 game at guard, Sault Ste. Marie, Michigan
- Fred Hendershot: end, Tecumseh, Michigan
- Arthur Karpus (1899–1983): started 1 game at end
- **Kenneth Thomson "Mike" Knode** (1895–1980): started 4 games at quarterback, Martinsburg, West Virginia
- Chester C. Morrison: started 1 game at tackle and 1 game at end, Pittsburgh, Pennsylvania (Peabody H.S.)
- **John Perrin** (1898–1969): started 4 games at halfback, Escanaba, Michigan
- **Frank Steketee** (1900–1951): fullback, Grand Rapids, Michigan
- Edward Usher: started 1 game at fullback, Toledo, Ohio (Scott H.S.)
- **Ernie Vick** (1900–1980): started 4 games at center, Toledo, Ohio (Scott H.S.)
- Harlan N. Walker: quarterback, Highland Park, Michigan

=== Non-letter winners ===
The following individuals from the 1918 team were not awarded M's but instead received "AMA" or "R" designations.

- Fred W. Andreas (R): Cleveland, Ohio
- John M. Barnes (AMA): guard, Washington, D.C.
- Stanley J. Carter (AMA): started 1 game at quarterback, Pontiac, Michigan
- Oscar H. Cartwright (AMA): Detroit, Michigan
- C. C. Clash (R): started 1 game at tackle
- Dudley A. Daniels (R): Cleveland, Ohio
- Frederick S. Fletcher (AMA): started 1 game at end, Chicago, Illinois
- Cyrus R. Funk (R) (1898–1965): Cassopolis, Michigan
- Milton S. Geiger (R) (1900–1991): Alliance, Ohio
- Lowell B. Genebach (AMA) (1898–1978): halfback, Battle Creek, Michigan
- Paul J. Gingrass (R) (1899–1966): Marquette, Michigan
- Cosimer J. "Cass" Gogulski (R) (1897–1978): Grand Rapids, Michigan
- D. L. Hadden (AMA):
- Edward Hauser (R): Ann Arbor, Michigan
- Paul D. Henderson (AMA): tackle, Detroit, Michigan
- Harold J. Hunt (AMA): Northfield, Minnesota
- Albert Hyde (R): Grant, Michigan
- Archie F. Jordan (AMA): quarterback, Detroit, Michigan
- F. S. Kerwin (R):
- Albert John Lent (R): started 1 game at tackle, Saginaw, Michigan
- F. H. Lillis:
- L. O. Lindstrom (AMA): right guard, Marquette, Michigan
- Oscar C. Olson (AMA): fullback, Saginaw, Michigan
- Isadore Rosenfield (R): Toledo, Ohio
- Nicholas O. Scheidler (R) (1897–1978): tackle, Ann Arbor, Michigan
- H. B. Smith (R):
- Theodore A. Timchac (AMA): Saginaw, Michigan
- Murray D. Van Wagoner (AMA): center, Pontiac, Michigan
- C. Wilford Wilson (AMA): Ann Arbor, Michigan

== Awards and honors ==
- Captain: Tad Wieman
- All-Americans: Frank Steketee
- All-Conference: Frank Steketee, Ernie Vick, Angus Goetz

== Coaching staff ==
- Head coach: Fielding H. Yost
- Assistant coach: Prentiss Douglass
- Freshman coach: Elmer Mitchell
- Trainer: Dr. George May (physical director of the Waterman Gymnasium)
- Manager: Donald M. Springer
- Assistant managers: H. Hart Anderson, C. T. Hogan
