= 1918 Illinois Fighting Illini football team =

American college football season

1918 Illinois Fighting Illini football
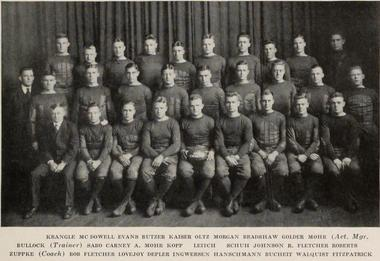

Big Ten co-champion
- Conference: Big Ten Conference
- Record: 5–2 (4–0 Big Ten)
- Head coach: Robert Zuppke (6th season)
- Offensive scheme: I formation
- Captain: Burt Ingwersen
- Home stadium: Illinois Field

1918 Big Ten Conference football standings
| | Conf. | | | | | Overall |
| Team | W | | L | | T | W | | L | | T |
|---|---|---|---|---|---|---|---|---|---|---|
| Michigan + | 2 | – | 0 | – | 0 | 5 | – | 0 | – | 0 |
| Illinois + | 4 | – | 0 | – | 0 | 5 | – | 2 | – | 0 |
| Purdue + | 1 | – | 0 | – | 0 | 3 | – | 3 | – | 0 |
| Iowa | 2 | – | 1 | – | 0 | 6 | – | 2 | – | 1 |
| Minnesota | 2 | – | 1 | – | 0 | 5 | – | 2 | – | 1 |
| Northwestern | 1 | – | 1 | – | 0 | 2 | – | 2 | – | 1 |
| Wisconsin | 1 | – | 2 | – | 0 | 3 | – | 3 | – | 0 |
| Indiana | 0 | – | 0 | – | 0 | 2 | – | 2 | – | 0 |
| Ohio State | 0 | – | 3 | – | 0 | 3 | – | 3 | – | 0 |
| Chicago | 0 | – | 5 | – | 0 | 4 | – | 6 | – | 1 |
$ – Conference champion

The 1918 Illinois Fighting Illini football team was an American football team that represented the University of Illinois during the 1918 Big Ten Conference football season. In their sixth season under head coach Robert Zuppke, the Illini compiled a 5–2 record and tied for the Big Ten Conference championship.

Center Jack Depler was a consensus first-team All-American. Depler was selected as a first-team center by the Frank Menke Syndicate. He was the only Big Ten player to be named a consensus All-American in 1918.

Tackle Burt Ingwersen, guard Albert Mohr, and halfback Jesse Kirkpatrick received first-team All-Big Ten honors. Ingwersen was also the acting team captain.

== Schedule ==
| Date | Opponent | Site | Result | Attendance |
|---|---|---|---|---|
| October 4 | at Chanute Air Force Base* | Chanute Field; Rantoul, IL | W 3–0 | |
| October 12 | Great Lakes Navy* | Illinois Field; Champaign, IL | L 0–7 | 2,535 |
| October 26 | Chicago Naval Reserve* | Illinois Field; Champaign, IL | L 0–7 | |
| November 2 | Iowa | Iowa Field; Iowa City, IA | W 19–0 | |
| November 9 | at Wisconsin | Camp Randall Stadium; Madison, WI | W 22–0 | 7,000 |
| November 16 | Ohio State^{†} | Illinois Field; Champaign, IL (rivalry) | W 13–0 | 2,786 |
| November 23 | at Chicago | Stagg Field; Chicago, IL | W 29–0 | |
*Non-conference game; ^{†}Homecoming

== Game summaries ==
On October 5, 1918, Illinois opened its season with a victory over the team from Chanute Aviation Field from Rantoul, Illinois. The Illini won, 3–0, before a crowd of 2,500 in Urbana, Illinois. The game's only points were scored by Illinois guard Leitsch on a field goal from the 38-yard line. The Chanute team was led by Archie Weston, who had played for Michigan in 1917. Eleven planes from the Chanute Field flew over the game. Illinois had originally been scheduled to play Iowa State on the date, but that game was canceled due to travel restrictions.

On October 12, 1918, Illinois lost to the Great Lakes Naval Training Station team, 7–0, in Urbana, Illinois. Great Lakes scored a touchdown in the first quarter, and both teams were held scoreless thereafter. Paddy Driscoll returned the kickoff at the start of the second half for 65 yards. The 1918 Great Lakes Navy Bluejackets football team compiled a 3–0–1 record against Big Ten opponents, went on to win the 1919 Rose Bowl, and featured three players (George Halas, Jimmy Conzelman, and Paddy Driscoll) who were later inducted into the Pro Football Hall of Fame. Charlie Bachman, who was hired as Northwestern's coach after the season and was later inducted into the College Football Hall of Fame, also played for the 1918 Great Lakes team.

On October 26, 1918, Illinois lost, 7–0, against Chicago Naval Reserve a team from the United States Naval Reserve School at Chicago's Municipal Pier. The game was played in Urbana, Illinois. Due to health concerns, "the gates were barred and the spectators limited to coaches, water carriers, officials, and the few others necessary to pull off a contest."

On November 2, 1918, Illinois defeated Iowa, 19–0, at Iowa City. Illinois scored touchdowns in the second, third, and fourth quarters. The Des Moines Register credited Illinois' victory to "perfectly executed forward passes and machinelike teamwork."

On November 9, 1918, Illinois defeated Wisconsin, 22–0, before a crowd of 7,000 at Camp Randall Field in Madison, Wisconsin. According to the Chicago Daily Tribune, the Badgers were "outclassed and outweighed" while the Illini "fought like wildcats" and had the Badgers on the defensive through most of the game.

On November 16, 1918, Illinois defeated Ohio State, 13–0, on a muddy field in Champaign, Illinois. Kirkpatrick and Sabo scored touchdowns for Illinois.

On November 23, 1918, Illinois defeated Chicago, 29–0, at Stagg Field in Chicago.

== Roster ==
| Player | Position |
| Burt Ingwersen (captain) | Tackle |
| William Kopp | Fullback |
| John C. Depler | Center |
| Robert Fletcher | Quarterback |
| Ralph Fletcher | Halfback, kicker |
| Chuck Carney | End, punter |
| Lawrence Walquist | Halfback, quarterback |
| Albert Mohr | Guard |
| Milton Olander | Guard, tackle |
| George Buchheit | End |
| Ralph Lanum | Fullback |
| Neil Leitch | Guard |
| C. Ernest Lovejoy | End |
| Fred Hanschmann | Guard |
| John Sabo Jr. | Halfback |
| Jesse Kirkpatrick | Halfback |

- Head coach: Robert Zuppke (6th year at Illinois)

== Awards and honors ==
- Jack Depler, center

- First-team selection by the Frank Menke Syndicate for the 1918 College Football All-America Team
- Second-team selection by Walter Camp for the 1918 All-America team
