= 1918 Ohio State Buckeyes football team =

American college football season

1918 Ohio State Buckeyes football
- Conference: Big Ten Conference, Ohio Athletic Conference
- Record: 3–3 (0–3 Big Ten, 3–0 OAC)
- Head coach: John Wilce (6th season)
- Home stadium: Ohio Field

1918 Big Ten Conference football standings
	Conf.					Overall
Team	W		L		T	W		L		T
Michigan +	2	–	0	–	0	5	–	0	–	0
Illinois +	4	–	0	–	0	5	–	2	–	0
Purdue +	1	–	0	–	0	3	–	3	–	0
Iowa	2	–	1	–	0	6	–	2	–	1
Minnesota	2	–	1	–	0	5	–	2	–	1
Northwestern	1	–	1	–	0	2	–	2	–	1
Wisconsin	1	–	2	–	0	3	–	3	–	0
Indiana	0	–	0	–	0	2	–	2	–	0
Ohio State	0	–	3	–	0	3	–	3	–	0
Chicago	0	–	5	–	0	4	–	6	–	1
$ – Conference champion

1918 Ohio Athletic Conference football standings
	Conf.					Overall
Team	W		L		T	W		L		T
Wittenberg $	3	–	0	–	0	4	–	0	–	0
Miami (OH)	4	–	0	–	1	5	–	0	–	1
Mount Union	5	–	1	–	0	6	–	1	–	0
Wooster	5	–	1	–	0	6	–	1	–	0
Western Reserve	5	–	1	–	0	5	–	2	–	0
Ohio	1	–	0	–	1	4	–	0	–	1
Cincinnati	0	–	0	–	2	3	–	0	–	2
Ohio Wesleyan	2	–	2	–	0	3	–	2	–	0
Case	2	–	3	–	2	3	–	5	–	2
Akron	1	–	2	–	1	2	–	2	–	1
Oberlin	1	–	4	–	0	1	–	4	–	0
Baldwin–Wallace	0	–	4	–	1	5	–	4	–	1
Kenyon	0	–	4	–	0	1	–	4	–	0
Ohio Northern	0	–	5	–	0	1	–	5	–	0
Denison	0	–	5	–	0	1	–	6	–	0
Ohio State *	3	–	0	–	0	3	–	3	–	0
$ – Conference champion; * – did not complete for championship

The 1918 Ohio State Buckeyes football team was an American football team that represented Ohio State University in the 1918 Big Ten Conference football season. In their sixth year under head coach John Wilce, the Buckeyes compiled a 3–3 record (0–3 against conference opponents) and outscored opponents by a combined total of 134 to 41.

End Clarence A. MacDonald received first-team honors on the 1918 All-Big Ten Conference football team.

With the country involved in World War I, many of the top football players did not play due to military service. Players serving in the military included Chic Harley and Gaylord Stinchcomb of Ohio State.

In response to the Spanish flu pandemic, the football schedule was modified. The matchup with Northwestern was canceled while the game against Michigan was moved to the last game in November.

== Schedule ==
Date	Opponent	Site	Result	Attendance
October 5	Ohio Wesleyan	Ohio Field; Columbus, OH	W 41–0	
October 12	Denison	Ohio Field; Columbus, OH	W 34–0	
October 19	Northwestern		Canceled	
November 9	Case	Ohio Field; Columbus, OH	W 56–0	
November 16	at Illinois	Illinois Field; Champaign, IL (rivalry)	L 0–13	2,786
November 23	Wisconsin	Ohio Field; Columbus, OH	L 3–14	
November 30	Michigan	Ohio Field; Columbus, OH (rivalry)	L 0–14	7,000

== Game summaries ==
On October 5, 1918, Ohio State defeated Ohio Wesleyan, 41–0, in Columbus, Ohio.

On October 12, 1918, Ohio State defeated Denison, 34–0, in Columbus, Ohio. With Chic Harley serving in the military, halfback Thomas Davies was the star for the Buckeyes.

On November 9, 1918, Ohio State defeated Case, 56–0, on a muddy field in Columbus, Ohio.

On November 16, 1918, Illinois defeated Ohio State, 13–0, on a muddy field in Champaign, Illinois. Kirkpatrick and Sabo scored touchdowns for Illinois.

On November 23, 1918, Wisconsin defeated Ohio State, 14–3, in Columbus, Ohio.

On November 30, 1918, Michigan defeated Ohio State, 14–0, in Columbus, Ohio. The game was played on a wet, muddy and slippery field that handicapped the offensive players. The teams played to a scoreless tie in a first half. Michigan's first touchdown was set up by a 73-yard punt from Frank Steketee that "stuck fast in the mud" at Ohio State's two- or three-yard line. Michigan's defense held, and Ohio State was forced to punt from his end zone. Angus Goetz blocked the punt and recovered it in the end zone for a touchdown. Later in the game, Steketee faked a run around the end and passed to Robert J. Dunne who was "camped near the uprights." This was the first matchup between the rivals while they were both members of the Western (Big Ten) Conference.
