= Guy Lowman =

American football, basketball and baseball coach and player of baseball

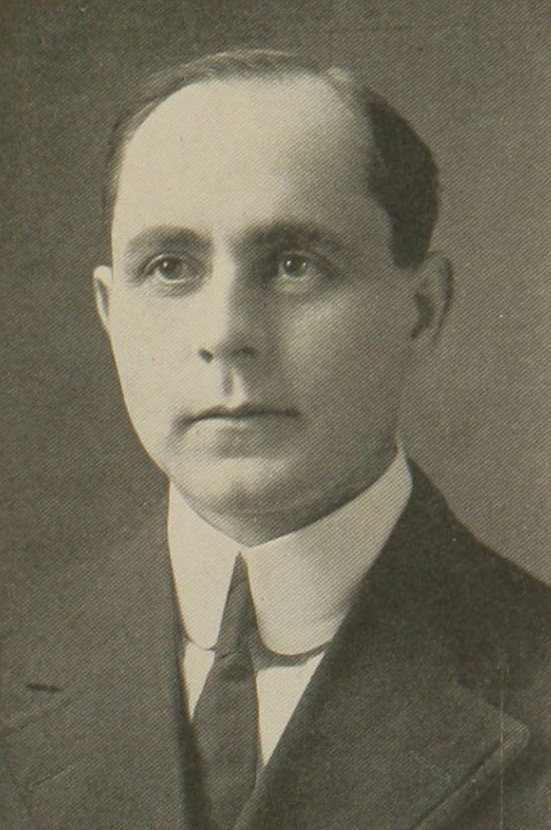
- Lowman pictured in The Royal Purple 1913, Kansas State yearbook

Biographical details
- Born: May 12, 1877; Griswold, Iowa, U.S.
- Died: September 14, 1943 (aged 66); Madison, Wisconsin, U.S.

Playing career

Baseball
- 1905: Springfield

Coaching career (HC unless noted)

Football
- 1907: Warrensburg Teachers
- 1909: Missouri (assistant)
- 1910: Alabama
- 1911–1914: Kansas State
- 1918: Wisconsin

Basketball
- 1907–1908: Warrensburg Teachers
- 1908–1910: Missouri
- 1911–1914: Kansas State
- 1916–1917: Indiana
- 1917–1920: Wisconsin

Baseball
- 1907–1908: Warrensburg Teachers
- 1909–1910: Missouri
- 1911: Alabama
- 1912–1915: Kansas State
- 1918: Wisconsin
- 1921–1932: Wisconsin

Administrative career (AD unless noted)
- 1907–1908: Warrensburg Teachers
- 1910–1911: Alabama

Head coaching record
- Overall: 31–24–3 (football); 100–57 (basketball)

Accomplishments and honors

Championships
- Football; 1 KCAC (1912)

Guy Sumner Lowman (May 1877 – September 14, 1943) was an American football, basketball, and baseball coach and a player of baseball. He served as the head football coach at Warrensburg Teachers College—now the University of Central Missouri (1907), the University of Alabama (1910), Kansas State University (1911–1914), and the University of Wisconsin–Madison (1918). Lowman also coached basketball at Warrensburg Teachers College, now known as the University of Central Missouri (1907–1908), the University of Missouri, (1908–1910), Kansas State (1911–1914), Indiana University (1916), and Wisconsin (1917–1920) and baseball at Central Missouri State (1907–1908), Missouri (1909–1910), Alabama (1911), Kansas State (1912–1915), and Wisconsin (1918, 1921–1932).

== Playing career ==
Lowman graduated from Springfield College in 1905, where he lettered in baseball.

== Coaching career ==
Following graduation, he began his career at Warrensburg Teachers College, coaching football, basketball, and baseball from 1907 to 1908. Subsequently, from 1908 to 1910, he coached baseball and basketball at the University of Missouri, posting a 19–15 record in basketball and 20–11–1 record in baseball. In 1910, he moved to the University of Alabama, where he coached the football team for one season, recording a 4–4 mark.

Leaving Alabama after one season, he moved to Kansas State University, where he coached football (four seasons), basketball (three seasons), and baseball (four seasons) between 1911 and 1915. His basketball teams posted winning records each year he coached them. His best football season at Kansas State was 1912, when his squad posted an 8–2 record and won the Kansas Collegiate Athletic Conference title. He was fired after his 1914 football team recorded a 1–5–1 mark.

In 1916, Lowman moved to Indiana University, where he coached the basketball squad to a 13–6 record. From 1917 to 1920, he coached baseball and basketball at the University of Wisconsin–Madison. He also coached the Wisconsin football team for the 1918 season, posting a 3–3 mark. His 1917–18 basketball team posted a 14–3 record and won the Big Ten Conference title.

== Later life, death and honors ==
After his coaching career ended, Lowman remained at the University of Wisconsin–Madison as a professor, and served as chairman of the Physical Education Department there. He died on September 14, 1943, at the age of 66 after a long illness. The baseball field at Wisconsin was named in his honor.

== Head coaching record ==
=== Football ===
Year	Team	Overall	Conference	Standing
Warrensburg Teachers () (1907)
1907	Warrensburg Teachers	7–2		
Warrensburg Teachers:		7–2		
Alabama Crimson Tide (Southern Intercollegiate Athletic Association) (1910)
1910	Alabama	4–4	1–4	
Alabama:		4–4	1–4	
Kansas State Aggies (Kansas Collegiate Athletic Conference) (1911–1912)
1911	Kansas State	5–4–1		
1912	Kansas State	8–2	5–0	1st
Kansas State Aggies (Kansas Collegiate Athletic Conference / Missouri Valley Conference) (1913)
1913	Kansas State	3–4–1	2–1–1 / 0–2	4th / 6th
Kansas State Aggies (Missouri Valley Conference) (1914)
1914	Kansas State	1–5–1	0–3	7th
Kansas State:		17–15–3		
Wisconsin Badgers (Big Ten Conference) (1918)
1918	Wisconsin	3–3	1–2	7th
Wisconsin:		3–3	1–2	
Total:		31–24–3		
National championship Conference title Conference division title or championship game berth
