= Ernie Vick =

American football and baseball player (1900–1980)

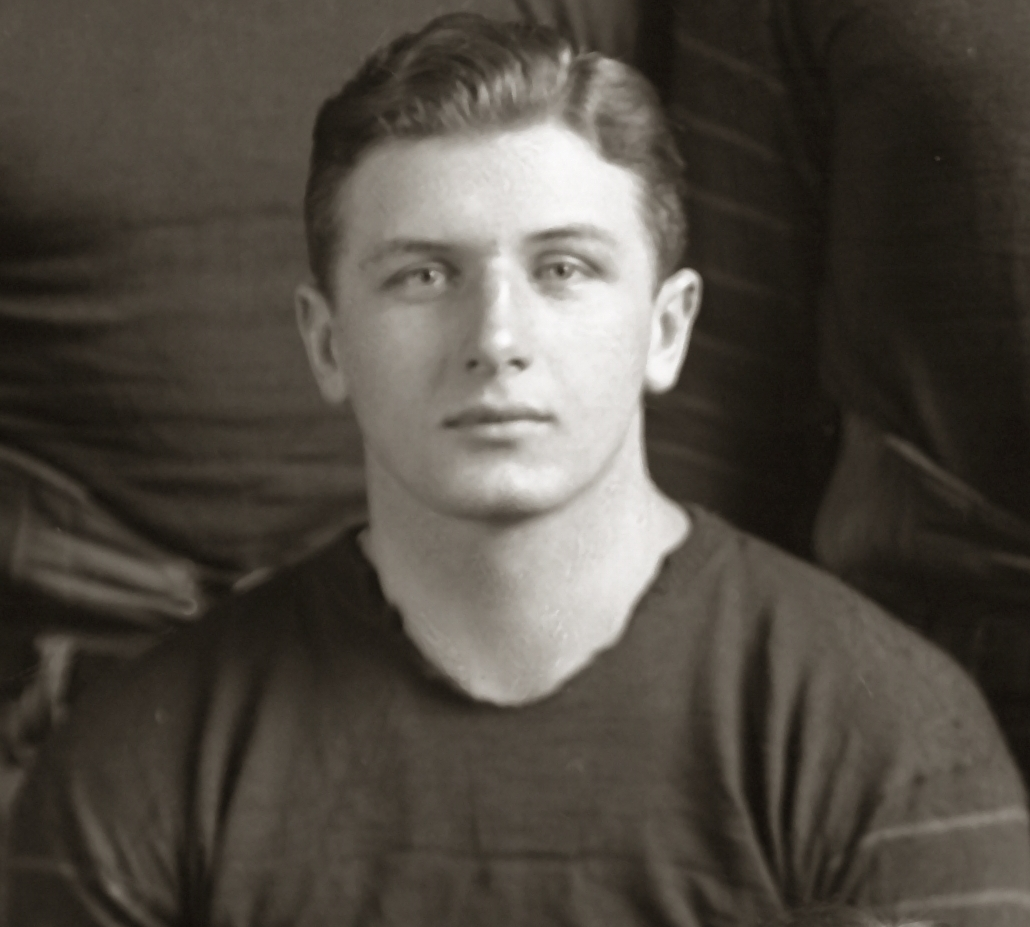
- Vick in 1920

Profile
- Positions: Catcher in baseball Center in football

Personal information
- Born: July 2, 1900; Toledo, Ohio, U.S.
- Died: July 16, 1980 (aged 80); Ann Arbor, Michigan, U.S.

Career information
- College: University of Michigan

Career history
- St. Louis Cardinals (1922–1926); Detroit Panthers (1925); Chicago Bears (1927–1928); Detroit Wolverines (1928)

Awards and highlights
- National champion (1918); First-team All-American (1921); First-team All-Big Ten (1921)
- College Football Hall of Fame

Henry Arthur "Ernie" Vick (July 2, 1900 – July 16, 1980) was an American football and baseball player. He was selected as an All-American center in 1921, played on the 1926 World Series champion St. Louis Cardinals, and was elected to the College Football Hall of Fame in 1983.

== University of Michigan ==
Born in Toledo, Ohio, Vick graduated from Toledo Scott High School. He attended the University of Michigan where he lettered four years in football (1918–1921) and two years in baseball (1921–1922).

=== Football ===
As a 180-pound freshman in 1918, Vick was permitted to play varsity football under the Students' Army Training Corps rule in effect during World War I. He was named to a number of All-Western teams as a freshman in 1918.

In 1919, owing to "the lack of backfield material" in Ann Arbor, Vick was moved to the fullback position. After being laid up with a foot blister in Michigan's early games, Vick built a reputation as "a star line plunger" who was "fast for his weight."

In 1920, Vick was moved back to the center position, where he was Michigan's starter in 1920 and 1921. Michigan's Coach Fielding H. Yost said of Vick: "He is the most accurate passer from center that has ever put a ball into play. Under pressure he was dependable at all times." Vick was named to Walter Camp's All-American team in 1921. Camp said of Vick: "He is the only man who has throughout the season added great power and aggressiveness to steadiness and consistency." After exception was taken by many to Camp's selection of Vick, Michigan's Harry Kipke wrote a column in the Lansing State Journal defending the selection. Kipke wrote:

"Vick is the greatest lineman Michigan has had since the days of "Germany" Schultze. He is good on the offense and even greater on the defense. He has studied football and knows the game from all angles. His defensive work is the best that has been seen on the western gridirons in years. … He is a rough, rugged and dependable man to have in the pivot position."

Kipke noted that Coach Yost had so much confidence in Vick that he would often ask Vick's opinion on plays and players. Kipke said, "When as great a coach as Yost takes in his confidence one of the men playing on his team, he must be far superior to any player on the eleven."

After Vick's selection as an All-American, newspapers across the country published articles about his unusual practice schedule. Vick enrolled in Michigan's medical school in the fall of 1921, and the heavy load of classes and study prevented him from practicing with the team. A substitute ran through the signals at practice each night, but Vick donned his uniform and played the center position on game days. Under the headline "All-American Center Played Only Seven Hours in 1921," The Bridgeport Telegram noted:

"Allowing that there were seven conference games on Michigan's grid schedule in the fall, it can safely be said that 'Ernie' did not play more than that number of hours during the entire season."

Press accounts praised Vick for "his absolute dependability in passing the ball, coupled with his almost superhuman defensive play." It was also reported that, despite his lack of practice time, Vick "never had one minute of time taken out," and was never "credited with a bad pass to a back field man." The Michigan Alumnus devoted more than a page to Vick after his selection as an All-American, including the following:

"Followers of football at Michigan did not doubt Vick's supremacy as a centre. … Vick was unquestionably the mainstay of the line. There was hardly a play that he did not get into. It is admitted that there was not a better lineman in the West at diagnosing a play, and when the play was completed Vick usually emerged from the mass of men who had stopped the formation."

After Vick graduated from Michigan, sports columnist Billy Evans wrote, "The name Vick will live long in the memory of those who like Big Ten football. Michigan will always remember his great work."

=== Baseball ===
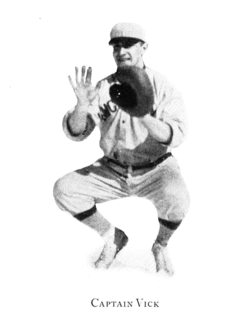
Vick as U of M baseball coach in 1922.

Vick also played on Michigan's baseball team, as a catcher, in 1921 and 1922. During Vick's two seasons on the Michigan baseball team, they had a record of 42-10. Vick proved himself to be "a great baseball player" and was considered the best catcher in the Big Ten in 1921. At the conclusion of the 1921 season, the team voted unanimously to elect Vick as the captain of the 1922 Woverines baseball team. Vick had been set to join the St. Louis Cardinals in 1922, but opted to stay for his senior year after being selected as the team's captain. Former Michigan baseball coach Branch Rickey had seen Vick's ability and reportedly kept a contract ready for Vick to sign "any time he desires." Vick ended his athletic career at Michigan with the conclusion of the baseball season in June 1922.

== Professional athlete ==
=== Baseball ===
As soon as the college baseball season had ended, Vick signed with the St. Louis Cardinals and joined the team in Boston on June 5, 1922. He made his Major League debut on June 29, 1922, but spent most of the 1922 season playing for the Cardinals' affiliate in the American Association at Syracuse. Vick batted .320 with Syracuse in 1922. In the spring of 1923, Vick played with the Houston Buffs, and did not play in any Major League games during the 1923 season. In 1924, Vick appeared in 16 games for the Cardinals and compiled a .348 batting average and .423 on-base percentage. After the 1925 season, columnist Billy Evans wrote that Vick was an "excellent baseball prospect," but injuries had "kept him from proving his real worth as a big leaguer." His most serious injury was "a badly shattered thumb" that threatened to end his career.

In 1926, Vick appeared in 24 games for the Cardinals team that won the 1926 World Series. Vick was best known in baseball as the catcher for Grover Cleveland Alexander. Vick played in his last Major League game on September 25, 1926. In April 1927, Vick refused to follow the Cardinals' orders and report to Houston in the Texas League, and was sold to Indianapolis in the American Association.

In four seasons with the Cardinals, Vick appeared in 57 Major League games, compiling 26 hits in 112 at-bats for a .232 batting average with 7 RBIs and scoring 12 runs.

In 1958, when Vick visited the Baseball Hall of Fame, a New York newspaper reported that he was wearing a 1926 World Series ring that had been on his finger for 32 years. The paper reported that there was "a twinkle in his eyes" when he saw his picture in the team photo of the 1926 Cardinals, seated in the front row with Billy Southworth, Bob O'Farrell and Grover Cleveland Alexander. When he arrived at the plaque of his former teammate, Rogers Hornsby, Vick remarked, "This is a great moment in my life. Rajah, the greatest hitter in all National League history, and, maybe including the American League."

=== Football ===
In 1922 and 1923, Vick returned to Ann Arbor after baseball season ended. He served there as a line coach for the football team under Fielding H. Yost in 1922 and George Little in 1923. During his coaching days, Vick published an article about proper technique for centers in which he described the center as "the mainspring of the football machine." He noted there were two ways of passing the ball to the backfield—the spiral or end-over-end. Vick wrote that he preferred the end-over-end, because he was a more accurate passer that way. In October 1925, Vick told a reporter that he loved football and enjoyed coaching, but he had decided to sever his connection with football as a means of making a living. Vick complained that the salaries paid by the western schools was insufficient to make it worthwhile. In 1925, Vick decided not to return to Ann Arbor and instead signed to play professional football with the Detroit Panthers. He played in 10 games for the Panthers in 1925. With Vick playing at center, the 1925 Panthers finished with a record of 8-2-2, allowing only 39 points on defense—2nd best in the NFL. In 1927, Vick signed with George Halas's Chicago Bears team. Vick was secured by the Bears after the Panthers fell "on the financial rocks." Vick played in 10 games for the 1927 Bears team.

In 1928, Vick split the season between the Bears and the Detroit Wolverines, playing one game for Chicago and six for Detroit.

== Big Ten official and manufacturer's representative ==
In February 1929, Vick signed a contract to serve as an umpire in the Piedmont League. And in the fall of 1929, Vick was working as a bond salesman in Michigan, but also signed up to serve as an assistant football coach under Bud Daugherty at Albion College. Vick later worked as a football official for the Big Ten Conference. He spent 22 years working games for the conference before retiring in 1953. He also officiated in baseball games and worked the Rose Bowl game and other important post-season contests.

He also worked as a manufacturer's representative before retiring in 1959. Vick died in July 1980, in Ann Arbor, Michigan.

== See also ==
- University of Michigan Athletic Hall of Honor
- List of Michigan Wolverines football All-Americans
- List of athletes who played in Major League Baseball and the National Football League
