= Fred J. Murphy =

American athlete, coach, and administrator (1886–1956)

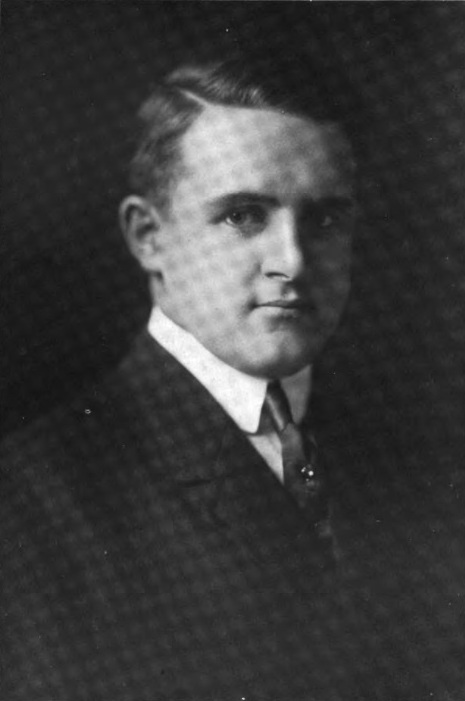
- Murphy in 1914

Biographical details
- Born: February 4, 1886; Southville, Massachusetts, U.S.
- Died: December 17, 1956 (aged 70); Miami, Florida, U.S.

Playing career

Football
- 1907–1909: Yale

Basketball
- c. 1910: Yale

Baseball
- c. 1910: Yale
- Positions: Halfback (football); Guard (basketball); Center fielder (baseball)

Coaching career (HC unless noted)

Football
- 1911: Yale (field coach)
- 1912–1913: Yale (advisory coach)
- 1914–1918: Northwestern
- 1920–1922: Denver
- 1924–1926: Kentucky

Basketball
- 1912–1913: Manhattan
- 1914–1917: Northwestern

Baseball
- 1914–1916: Northwestern
- 1925–1926: Kentucky

Administrative career (AD unless noted)
- 1913–1918: Northwestern

Head coaching record
- Overall: 40–37–4 (football); 36–45 (basketball); 20–31–2 (baseball)

Frederick James Murphy (February 4, 1886 – December 17, 1956) was an American college football, college basketball, and college baseball player and coach and college athletics administrator. Murphy served as the head football coach at Northwestern University (1914–1918), University of Denver (1920–1922), and University of Kentucky (1924–1926), compiling a career college football head coaching record of 40–37–4. He was also the head basketball coach at Manhattan College (1912–1913) and at Northwestern (1914–1917), and the head baseball coach at Northwestern (1914–1916) and Kentucky (1925–1926). In addition, Murphy served as Northwestern's athletic director from 1913 to 1918.

== Early life, family, and playing career ==
Murphy was born on February 4, 1886, in Southville, Massachusetts, to Dennis Henry and Georgia (Blades) Murphy. He was a nephew of Mike Murphy and Yale Murphy. A native of Westborough, Massachusetts, Murphy attended Phillips Academy in Andover, Massachusetts. He then went to Yale University, where he played football as halfback in football, basketball as a guard, and baseball as center fielder.

== Coaching career ==
=== Northwestern ===
Murphy was the 12th head coach at Northwestern University and he held that position for five seasons, from 1914 until 1918. His coaching record at Northwestern was 16–16–1. This ranks him 11th at Northwestern in total wins and tenth at Northwestern in winning percentage.

=== University of Denver ===
Murphy returned to coaching in the 1920 season to coach at the University of Denver, a coaching position he held for three seasons until 1922. At Denver, he compiled a record of 12–7–2. His best season at Denver was 1922, when the team's record was 6–1–1, second only to his 6–1 season at Northwestern in 1916.

=== Kentucky ===
Murphy's next move was to become the head coach at the University of Kentucky from 1924 to 1926. There he compiled a record of 12–14–1.

== Later life and death ==
Murphy later worked as a personnel manager for Interchemical Corp. in New York before retiring, in 1948, due to poor health. He died on December 17, 1956, in Miami.

== Head coaching record ==
=== Football ===
Year	Team	Overall	Conference	Standing
Northwestern Purple (Western Conference / Big Ten Conference) (1914–1918)
1914	Northwestern	1–6	0–6	9th
1915	Northwestern	2–5	0–5	9th
1916	Northwestern	6–1	4–1	2nd
1917	Northwestern	5–2	3–2	T–3rd
1918	Northwestern	2–2–1	1–1	6th
Northwestern:		16–16–1	8–15	
Denver Ministers/Pioneers (Rocky Mountain Conference) (1920–1922)
1920	Denver	2–4	2–4	T–5th
1921	Denver	4–2–1	2–2–1	T–4th
1922	Denver	6–1–1	3–1–1	3rd
Denver:		12–7–2	7–6–2	
Kentucky Wildcats (Southern Conference) (1924–1926)
1924	Kentucky	4–5	2–3	T–14th
1925	Kentucky	6–3	4–2	7th
1926	Kentucky	2–6–1	1–4–1	T–19th
Kentucky:		12–14–1	7–9–1	
Total:		40–37–4		
