= Gus Ekberg =

American football player (1898–1952)

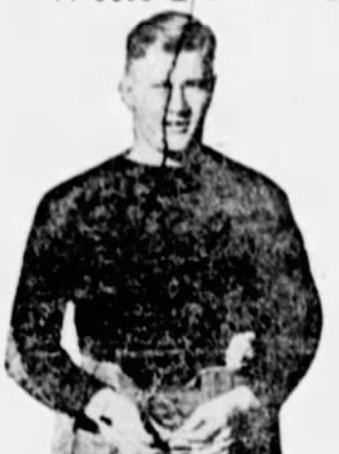

Profile
- Position: Fullback

Personal information
- Born: August 25, 1898; Minneapolis, Minnesota, U.S.
- Died: September 23, 1952 (aged 54); Minneapolis, Minnesota, U.S.
- Listed height: 5 ft 9 in (1.75 m)
- Listed weight: 180 lb (82 kg)

Career information
- High school: North (North St. Paul, Minnesota)
- College: West Virginia

Career history
- Cleveland Bulldogs (1925)

Awards and highlights
- Third-team All-American (1918)
- Stats at Pro Football Reference

Gustav Anthony Ekberg (August 25, 1898 – September 23, 1952), sometimes spelled Gus Eckberg, was an American professional football player who was a fullback for the Cleveland Bulldogs of the National Football League (NFL). He played college football for the West Virginia Mountaineers. He played in one game for the Cleveland in 1925.
