= List of people from Galesburg =

The following list includes notable people who were born or have lived in Galesburg, Illinois. For a similar list organized alphabetically by last name, see the category page People from Galesburg, Illinois.

== Educators, scientists, writers, and journalists ==
- Barry Bearak, Pulitzer Prize-winning journalist (lived in Galesburg while attending Knox College)
- Edward Beecher, theologian and abolitionist; brother of Harriet Beecher Stowe; first president of Illinois College
- Jonathan Blanchard, abolitionist, social reformer, and educator; president of Knox and founder of Wheaton College
- Ira Clifton Copley, publisher and statesman, founder of Copley Press
- John Huston Finley, former editor of the New York Times, professor at Princeton University, president of Knox and City College of New York
- George Helgesen Fitch, author, humorist, journalist
- George Washington Gale, founder of Knox College
- Anna Groff Bryant, vocal teacher at Lombard College
- Mikiso Hane, Japanese historian and professor at Knox College
- Robert Hellenga, novelist and George A. Lawrence Distinguished Service Professor of English at Knox
- George William Hunter, biologist and author of Civic Biology, textbook at heart of famed Scopes Monkey Trial (former professor at Knox)
- Tim Kasser, psychologist known for his work on materialism and well-being; professor at Knox 1995–2019
- Hiram Huntington Kellogg Sr., First President of Knox College (Illinois)
- Alexander Kuo, author, poet, essayist
- Johanna Maska, journalist and former White House director of Press Advance
- Francis T. McAndrew, evolutionary psychologist and essayist; Cornelia H. Dudley Professor of Psychology at Knox (1979–2025)
- Emily Arnold McCully, children's book author, winner of 1993 Caldecott Medal
- Carl Sandburg, writer and editor; winner of three Pulitzer Prizes, two for poetry and one for biography of Abraham Lincoln; born in Galesburg
- Ellen Browning Scripps, journalist and philanthropist, founder of Scripps Institution of Oceanography
- Robert Seibert, Robert W. Murphy Professor Emeritus of Political Science at Knox and coauthor of Politics and Change in the Middle East
- Chad Simpson, short and flash fiction author
- Marilyn Salzman Webb, activist, author, and journalist
- Mary Allen West, journalist, editor, educator, superintendent of schools, and temperance worker
- Douglas L. Wilson, author, co-director of Lincoln Studies Center; George A. Lawrence Distinguished Service Professor Emeritus of English at Knox
- Richard L. Wilson, newspaperman, recipient of 1954 Pulitzer Prize for National Reporting; born in Galesburg in 1905
- Quincy Wright, political scientist
- Sewall Wright, evolutionary biologist, a founder of modern population genetics
- Theodore Paul Wright, aeronautical engineer; served as acting president of Cornell University

== Business innovators and inventors ==
- Earnest Elmo Calkins, advertising executive, founder of first modern advertising agency
- Ellen Davis, coined the phrase "Cyber Monday" in 2005
- Albert Blake Dick, businessman; founded the A. B. Dick Company, a major American copier manufacturer and office supply company of the 20th century; coined the word "mimeograph"
- George Washington Gale Ferris Jr., inventor of the Ferris wheel
- Whitcomb L. Judson, inventor of the zipper
- Charles Rudolph Walgreen, founder of Walgreens

== Arts and entertainment ==
- Frank Shaver Allen, architect of Streator and Joliet, later of California, born in Galesburg in 1860
- Karen Bjornson (born 1952), model; born in Galesburg
- Amy Carlson, television actress best known for roles in Blue Bloods, Third Watch, and Another World (lived in Galesburg when she attended Knox College)
- Vir Das, comedian and Bollywood actor (lived in Galesburg while attending Knox College)
- Mae Shumway Enderly (born 1871), harpist, entertainer born in Galesburg
- Jack Finney, Prolific author primarily known for The Body Snatchers and Time and Again. Lived in Galesburg while attending Knox College.
- Hugh Gillin, actor
- Michael Greer, actor, comedian, and cabaret performer
- Otto Harbach, lyricist and librettist; known for "Smoke Gets in Your Eyes", "Indian Love Call" and "Cuddle up a Little Closer, Lovey Mine" (lived in Galesburg while attending Knox College)
- Justin Hartley, Actor, TV producer, director. Best known for playing the lead in the TV drama "Tracker (American TV series)"
- Dorsha Hayes, actress
- Richard Hunt, sculptor
- Kayleigh McKee, voice actress
- Mark Nicolson, opera singer
- Tim Piper, visual designer; born in Galesburg
- Stephen Prina, contemporary artist
- George Reeves, actor, played Superman in popular 1950s television show
- Dorothea Tanning, painter, printmaker, sculptor and writer
- Rudy Vaughn, singer-songwriter
- Chris Verene, artist
- Allan Arthur Willman, classical pianist and composer
- Matthew Wilson, jazz drummer, composer and band leader, born in Galesburg in 1964

== Military leaders ==
- Joseph A. Ahearn, U.S. Air Force general
- Mary Ann Bickerdyke, also known as "Mother Bickerdyke"; Civil War nurse for Union Army
- Gustavus Cheyney Doane, US Army officer and explorer
- David P. Fridovich, retired lieutenant general and Green Beret in U.S. Army, deputy commander of U.S. military's United States Special Operations Command (lived in Galesburg while attending Knox College)
- Hobart R. Gay, U.S. Army general, served under General George S. Patton

== Politics, government, and law ==
- William Adcock, Illinois state representative and farmer, lived in Galesburg
- Edgar Bancroft, lawyer and diplomat; served as U.S. ambassador to Japan
- John Rusling Block, cabinet member in Ronald Reagan administration; born in Galesburg
- Susan E. Cannon Allen, African-American suffragist
- George Radcliffe Colton, US Army colonel; governor of Puerto Rico (1909–1913)
- Edwin H. Conger, U.S. congressman, diplomat, and lawyer
- Omer N. Custer, Illinois state treasurer and newspaper editor; lived in Galesburg
- Phil Hare, U.S. congressman representing Illinois's 17th district
- Don Harmon, president of the Illinois State Senate (lived in Galesburg while attending Knox College)
- Carl Hawkinson, Illinois politician; born in Galesburg
- Russell Jump, mayor of Wichita, Kansas; born in Galesburg
- Richard R. Larson, Illinois state legislator, educator, and businessman; born in Galesburg
- Charles B. Lawrence, chief justice of Illinois Supreme Court; lived in Galesburg
- Leo F. O'Brien, Illinois state representative and lawyer; born in Galesburg
- John Podesta, chairman of Hillary Clinton presidential campaign, 2016, chief of staff to President Bill Clinton, and counselor to President Barack Obama; lived in Galesburg while attending Knox
- Ronald Reagan, 40th president of the United States; lived in Galesburg in his youth
- Don Samuelson, 25th governor of Idaho
- George L. Shoup, first governor of Idaho; moved to Galesburg at age 16
- Wallace Thompson, Illinois state senator; born in Galesburg
- Richard H. Whiting, U.S. representative 1875-77; lived in Galesburg

== Sports figures ==
- Barry Cheesman, former PGA Tour golfer, born and raised in Galesburg
- Mike Davison, pitcher for San Francisco Giants; born in Galesburg
- Bill Essick, former professional baseball pitcher
- A. J. Fike, driver with NASCAR
- Aaron Fike, driver with NASCAR
- Jimmie Foxx, Major League Baseball Hall of Famer; lived in retirement in Galesburg during the 1960s
- Todd Hamilton, golfer with PGA Tour, 2004 British Open champion; born in Galesburg
- Willie Heston, college football halfback and coach; state judge in Michigan; born in Galesburg
- Irma Hopper, Olympic fencer; born in Galesburg
- Elbert Kimbrough, safety with NFL's Los Angeles Rams, San Francisco 49ers, and New Orleans Saints; born in Galesburg
- Todd Monken, head coach of the NFL's Cleveland Browns, former offensive coordinator for the NFL's Baltimore Ravens, former Quarterbacks coach for the University of Georgia, former offensive coordinator of the NFL's Cleveland Browns and Tampa Bay Buccaneers, and former head coach at the University of Southern Mississippi (lived in Galesburg while attending Knox College)
- Jason Shay, assistant men's basketball coach for Wake Forest
- Jim Sundberg, catcher with Milwaukee Brewers, Kansas City Royals, Chicago Cubs, and Texas Rangers; born in Galesburg
- Art Twineham, catcher for St. Louis Browns; born in Galesburg
- Pete Weber, sports broadcaster, voice of NHL's Nashville Predators; born in Galesburg
- John Wozniak, former running backs coach at Oklahoma State University; current wide receivers coach with the NFL's Cleveland Browns
