= Philip Green Wright =

American economist

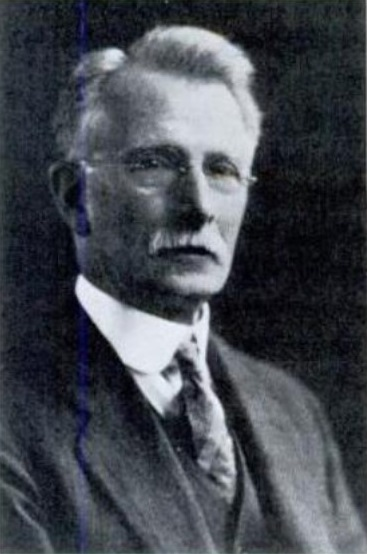
- Born: October 3, 1861; Boston, Massachusetts
- Died: September 4, 1934 (aged 72); Washington, D.C.
- Spouse(s): Elizabeth Quincy Sewall m. 1889, died 1952

Academic background
- Education: Tufts University; Harvard University

Academic work
- Discipline: Econometrics; International economics
- Institutions: Lombard College; Harvard University; Brookings Institution
- Notable ideas: Instrumental variables estimation

Philip Green Wright (October 3, 1861 – September 4, 1934) was an American economist who in 1928 first proposed the use of instrumental variables estimation as the earliest known solution to the identification problem in econometrics. In a book review published in 1915 he wrote one of the first explanations of the identification problem. His primary topic of applied research was tariff policy, and he wrote several books on the topic. He also wrote poetry, was a mentor to the poet and author Carl Sandburg, and published some of Sandburg's earliest works. Wright was the father of geneticist Sewall Wright.

== Early life ==
Wright was born in Boston, Massachusetts, in 1861 to John Seward Wright and Mary Clark Green Wright. His grandfather was Elizur Wright, an abolitionist and pioneer of life insurance regulation. Philip Wright grew up in Medford, Massachusetts, and in 1884 graduated from Tufts College with a bachelor of mechanic arts (AMB) degree. From 1884 to 1886 he taught mathematics at Buchtel College in Akron, Ohio, after which he attended Harvard University and graduated with a Master of Arts (AM) degree in economics in 1887.

After graduating from Harvard, Wright worked as a civil engineer and a life insurance actuary. In 1889 he married Elizabeth Quincy Sewall of Saint Paul, Minnesota, who was Wright's first cousin. Elizabeth would be a local leader in the women's suffrage movement. The couple had three sons, geneticist Sewall Wright, political scientist Quincy Wright, and aeronautical engineer Theodore Paul Wright.

== Lombard College and Sandburg ==
From 1892 to 1912, Wright was professor of mathematics, astronomy, and economics at Lombard College in Galesburg, Illinois. Lombard was a small Universalist college that would ultimately fold in 1930. During Wright's tenure, the typical enrollment was from 150 to 200 students with about 12 to 15 full-time faculty members. Wright's teaching load was heavy and covered a wide variety of subjects. In addition to teaching mathematics (through calculus), astronomy, and economics, he also taught classes in fiscal history, surveying, English composition, and literature and was director of the gymnasium. He owned a hand printing press, which he used to print college notices and bulletins from the basement of his home.

During his two decades at Lombard, Wright published little if any work in economics. Instead, he pursued poetry and published several volumes. In 1894 his book Natives and Exotics, a collection of 25 poems, was published by Brotherhood Steam Print, and in 1905 The Dial of the Heart was published by R.G. Badger. He also wrote two books of poetry, A Baker's Dozen for a Few Score Friends (1903) and The Dreamer (1906), that he published from his own basement press, which he named "Asgard Press." The Dreamer was favorably reviewed by William Marion Reedy, editor of The Mirror, who described it as "poetry of this very time, a poetry of intense concern of practicality, full of 'the hate of hater, the scorn of scorn, the love of love.'". Carl Sandburg wrote forewords for both The Dial of the Heart and The Dreamer under the name "Charles Sandburg" that he was using at the time.

From 1898 to 1902, Sandburg, recently discharged from military service in the Spanish–American War, enrolled as a student at Lombard College. Wright taught a class called "Daily Themes" in which students were required to write one or two-page essays each day and then critique their work. He also invited about a dozen students to his home each Sunday evening for a literary discussion group. During Sandburg's final year at Lombard, Wright organized a "Poor Writers' Club" consisting of Sandburg, two other students who were interested in creative writing, and himself, in which they discussed each other's work and endeavored to improve it. Sandburg was influenced not only by Wright's interests in poetry and literature, but also by his political theory and emphasis on social consciousness. Sandburg wrote, "I had four years of almost daily contact with [Wright] and visited with him in later years as often as possible. And there was never a time that he didn't deepen whatever reverence I had for the human mind and the workings of a vast mysterious Universe."

In 1904 Wright's Asgard Press published Sandburg's first book, In Reckless Ecstasy, a 39-page book containing 17 poems and six prose vignettes. Wright wrote the foreword, writing that the contents have "the delightful bloom and freshness and spontaneous enthusiasm of expression of one who is witnessing the sunrise for the first time." The edition of 100 copies sold out at a price of $1.00 each. Subsequently, the Asgard Press published three more brochure-sized works by Sandburg: Incidentals, a 32-page booklet containing short pieces on topics such as the pursuit of happiness; The Plaint of a Rose, a ten-page "prose-poem," and Joseffy, An Appreciation, a nine-page booklet about the magician Joseffy.

== Economics and instrumental variables ==
=== Return to Massachusetts ===
In 1912, with his two oldest sons having graduated from Lombard College, Wright decided to return to Massachusetts. He first took a position as an assistant professor at Williams College, substituting for a professor on leave. In 1913 he obtained employment at Harvard University, first as the assistant to Frank W. Taussig, his former advisor, then as an instructor in economics. Finally having the time and opportunity to write on economics, Wright was prolific, writing several articles and reviews for the Quarterly Journal of Economics, which Taussig edited.

In 1915, the Quarterly Journal of Economics published Wright's review of Economic Cycles: Their Law and Cause by Henry L. Moore, which included an early effort to estimate statistical demand curves. According to the law of demand, demand curves should show a negative relationship between price of a commodity and the quantity demanded. But in Moore's book, his statistical demand curve for one product, pig iron, infamously yielded a positive relationship between price and quantity. Moore tried to explain it as a new kind of demand curve, but Wright's review established that the positive slope could have been the result of a demand curve that was shifting to the right along a stable supply curve. In other words, without additional identifying information, it is impossible to determine whether a data correlation between price and quantity represents a demand curve, a supply curve, or an indeterminate mix of the two. Wright's review was one of the earliest statements of the identification problem in econometrics. At about the same time, the identification problem was also independently discovered by Marcel Lenoir in his 1913 doctoral dissertation, Etudes sur la Formation et le Mouvement des Prix, and by R.A. Lehfeldt in his 1915 review of Moore's book for the Economic Journal.

=== Move to Washington ===
In 1917, Wright accepted a position in Washington with the newly formed U.S. Tariff Commission where Taussig had been appointed as the first chairman. Wright remained at the Tariff Commission until 1922, when he accepted a position at the Institute of Economics, which would later become the Brookings Institution. He worked at Brookings until his retirement in 1929, writing several monographs and scholarly articles on international trade and tariffs. Meanwhile, Philip Wright's son, Sewall, completed his doctorate in genetics at Harvard University in 1915, then spent 10 years at the U.S. Department of Agriculture in Washington before taking a faculty position at the University of Chicago in 1926. In addition to studying physiological genetics, Sewall also worked in statistics investigating the relationship between correlation and causal inference and developing the method of path analysis to model causal relationships.

=== Instrumental variables ===
In an appendix of his 1928 book, The Tariff on Animal and Vegetable Oils, Wright proposed instrumental variables regression as a solution to the identification problem for a supply-and-demand model. Wright needed to estimate the slope of a demand curve in order to measure the impact of a tariff. But, as he had noted in his 1915 review of Moore's book, the observed data were determined simultaneously by supply and demand, so the demand curve could not be determined directly from data on price and quantity alone. The appendix begins with a thorough explanation of the identification problem in the context of a supply-and-demand model. Wright noted that statistical methods "must be based on the introduction of additional factors. Such additional factors may be factors which (A) affect demand conditions without affecting cost conditions or which (B) affect cost conditions without affecting demand conditions." He referred to these additional factors, which are now known as instrumental variables, as the "method of external factors." After solving the identification problem with instrumental variables, Wright then analyzed the problem using the method of path analysis and showed that it also could be used to solve the identification problem. He concluded by using both methods to estimate supply and demand equations for flaxseed and butter and found that the two methods produced similar results.

For more than four decades Wright's 1928 publication on instrumental variables was overlooked and largely forgotten. In the 1940s Olav Reiersøl and Roy C. Geary independently discovered the idea of using instrumental variables to solve the identification problem in an errors-in-variables model, and a 1945 paper by Reiersøl introduced the name "instrumental variables." In a 1972 article that largely focused on Sewall Wright's method of path analysis, Arthur Goldberger rediscovered Philip Wright's 1928 appendix.

Goldberger said that Wright prepared the 1928 appendix on instrumental variables in collaboration with his son, Sewall. Philip Wright's book did not acknowledge collaboration or authorship by Sewall, but the stark difference between the sophisticated statistical theory of the appendix and the tedious presentation of information on animal and vegetable oils in the rest of the book, together with Sewall's extensive publication record in statistics led many researchers citing the work to assume that Sewall was the author of the appendix. In 2003 James H. Stock and Francesco Trebbi endeavored to determine authorship by conducting stylometric analysis, comparing word usage and grammatical constructions to other samples of each author's writings, and concluded that the evidence clearly supports Philip as the writer. They acknowledged, however, that the stylometric analysis could not determine which man was responsible for coming up with the idea. Later, Stock and Kerry Clark obtained correspondence between Philip and Sewall Wright written during the winter of 1925–26 in which they worked out the two solutions to the identification problem, instrumental variables and path analysis. The letters made it clear that the solutions were worked out collaboratively with each man contributing to them. The letters also showed that prior to publication of the appendix, Philip Wright had submitted a paper describing the research to the Quarterly Journal of Economics, but it was rejected.

=== Retirement and death ===
After Wright's retirement from the Brookings Institution, he did research on tariffs for the Institute of Pacific Relations and on the effects of inflation for the Duke Foundation. With his wife, Elizabeth, he coauthored a biography of their grandfather, Elizur Wright, which was published after Philip's death.

Wright died on September 4, 1934, in Washington, D.C.

== Honors, recognition, and legacy ==
In January 1930, Wright received an honorary degree from Lombard College just a few months before the college folded and merged its academic programs with Knox College. A newspaper reported that at Lombard College's final commencement ceremonies on June 2, 1930, the exercises "were closed by the singing of 'The Lombard Hymn,' written by Dr. Philip G. Wright, Lombard ... former professor, of Washington, DC."

In honor of Wright and other teachers from Lombard College, Knox College annually presents the Philip Green Wright – Lombard College Prizes for Distinguished Teaching to two Knox faculty members.

On October 3, 2011, Tufts University organized a seminar honoring Wright on the 150th anniversary of his birth.
