= 1926 Western State Normal Hilltoppers football team =

American college football season

1926 Western State Normal Hilltoppers football
- Conference: Independent
- Record: 7–1
- Head coach: Earl Martineau (3rd season)
- Captain: Frank Banach
- Home stadium: Normal field

1926 Midwestern college football independents records
	Conf.			Overall
Team	W	L	T	W		L		T
Haskell		–		12	–	0	–	1
No. 3 Notre Dame		–		9	–	1	–	0
Western State Normal		–		7	–	1	–	0
Michigan State Normal		–		6	–	1	–	0
Muncie Normal		–		5	–	1	–	1
Northern Illinois State		–		5	–	1	–	1
Marquette		–		6	–	3	–	0
Lombard		–		5	–	3	–	0
Loyola (IL)		–		4	–	3	–	0
Central Michigan		–		3	–	4	–	1
Michigan State		–		3	–	4	–	1
Detroit		–		3	–	6	–	1
Butler		–		3	–	6	–	0
Saint Louis		–		3	–	6	–	0
John Carroll		–		2	–	5	–	1
Kent State		–		2	–	6	–	0
Valparaiso		–		1	–	4	–	1
Michigan Mines		–		0	–	2	–	1
Rankings from Dickinson System

The 1926 Western State Normal Hilltoppers football team was an American football team that represented Western State Normal School (later renamed Western Michigan University) during the 1926 college football season. In their third season under head coach Earl Martineau, the Hilltoppers compiled a 7–1 record, shut out five opponents, and outscored all opponents by a combined total of 132 to 20. Fullback Frank Banach was the team captain.

== Schedule ==
Date	Time	Opponent	Site	Result	Source
September 25	2:30 p.m.	Olivet	Normal field; Kalamazoo, MI	W 25–0	
October 2	2:30 p.m.	Bradley	Normal field; Kalamazoo, MI	L 0–12	
October 9	2:30 p.m.	Albion^{†}	Normal field; Kalamazoo, MI	W 28–0	
October 16		at Western Kentucky State Normal	Ogden Stadium; Bowling Green, KY	W 3–2	
October 23	2:30 p.m.	Chicago YMCA College	Normal field; Kalamazoo, MI	W 7–0	
October 30		at Valparaiso	Brown Field; Valparaiso, IN	W 37–0	
November 13	2:30 p.m.	Notre Dame hall team	Normal field; Kalamazoo, MI	W 12–6	
November 20	2:30 p.m.	Oshkosh State	Normal field; Kalamazoo, MI	W 20–0	
^{†}Homecoming; All times are in Central time
