= 1926 Muncie Normal Hoosieroons football team =

American college football season

1926 Muncie Normal Hoosieroons football
- Conference: Independent
- Record: 5–1–1
- Head coach: Norman G. Wann (1st season)

1926 Midwestern college football independents records
| | Conf. | | | Overall |
| Team | W | L | T | W | | L | | T |
|---|---|---|---|---|---|---|---|---|
| Haskell | | – | | 12 | – | 0 | – | 1 |
| No. 3 Notre Dame | | – | | 9 | – | 1 | – | 0 |
| Western State Normal | | – | | 7 | – | 1 | – | 0 |
| Michigan State Normal | | – | | 6 | – | 1 | – | 0 |
| Muncie Normal | | – | | 5 | – | 1 | – | 1 |
| Northern Illinois State | | – | | 5 | – | 1 | – | 1 |
| Marquette | | – | | 6 | – | 3 | – | 0 |
| Lombard | | – | | 5 | – | 3 | – | 0 |
| Loyola (IL) | | – | | 4 | – | 3 | – | 0 |
| Central Michigan | | – | | 3 | – | 4 | – | 1 |
| Michigan State | | – | | 3 | – | 4 | – | 1 |
| Detroit | | – | | 3 | – | 6 | – | 1 |
| Butler | | – | | 3 | – | 6 | – | 0 |
| Saint Louis | | – | | 3 | – | 6 | – | 0 |
| John Carroll | | – | | 2 | – | 5 | – | 1 |
| Kent State | | – | | 2 | – | 6 | – | 0 |
| Valparaiso | | – | | 1 | – | 4 | – | 1 |
| Michigan Mines | | – | | 0 | – | 2 | – | 1 |
Rankings from Dickinson System

The 1926 Muncie Normal Hoosieroons football team was an American football team that represented Muncie State Normal School (later renamed Ball State University) during the 1926 college football season. In its first season under head coach Norman G. Wann, the team compiled a 5–1–1 record.

== Schedule ==
| Date | Opponent | Site | Result | Attendance | Source |
|---|---|---|---|---|---|
| October 2 | at Wabash | Crawfordsville, IN | L 0–46 | | |
| October 15 | Indiana Central | Walnut Street Park; Muncie, IN | W 35–0 | | |
| October 20 | Manchester | Walnut Street Park; Muncie, IN | W 19–3 | | |
| October 30 | Central Normal | Walnut Street Park; Muncie, IN | T 0–0 | | |
| November 6 | at Oakland City | Oakland City, IN | W 54–7 | | |
| November 13 | Hanover^{†} | Walnut Street Park; Muncie, IN | W 13–0 | 2,000 | |
| November 20 | at Earlham | Reid Field; Richmond, IN | W 6–0 | | |
^{†}Homecoming
