= 1926 Saint Louis Billikens football team =

American college football season

1926 Saint Louis Billikens football
- Conference: Independent
- Record: 3–6
- Head coach: Robert L. Mathews (1st season)
- Home stadium: St. Louis University Athletic Field, Sportsman's Park

1926 Midwestern college football independents records
	Conf.			Overall
Team	W	L	T	W		L		T
Haskell		–		12	–	0	–	1
No. 3 Notre Dame		–		9	–	1	–	0
Western State Normal		–		7	–	1	–	0
Michigan State Normal		–		6	–	1	–	0
Muncie Normal		–		5	–	1	–	1
Northern Illinois State		–		5	–	1	–	1
Marquette		–		6	–	3	–	0
Lombard		–		5	–	3	–	0
Loyola (IL)		–		4	–	3	–	0
Central Michigan		–		3	–	4	–	1
Michigan State		–		3	–	4	–	1
Detroit		–		3	–	6	–	1
Butler		–		3	–	6	–	0
Saint Louis		–		3	–	6	–	0
John Carroll		–		2	–	5	–	1
Kent State		–		2	–	6	–	0
Valparaiso		–		1	–	4	–	1
Michigan Mines		–		0	–	2	–	1
Rankings from Dickinson System

The 1926 Saint Louis Billikens football team was an American football team that represented Saint Louis University as an independent during the 1926 college football season. In their first season under head coach Robert L. Mathews, the Billikens compiled a 3–6 record and were outscored by a total of 198 to 87. The team played its home games at St. Louis University Athletic Field and Sportsman's Park in St. Louis.

== Schedule ==
Date	Opponent	Site	Result	Attendance	Source
October 2	Southwest Missouri State	St. Louis University Athletic Field; St. Louis, MO	W 12–0		
October 9	Drury	Sportsman's Park; St. Louis, MO	W 52–0		
October 16	Marquette	Sportsman's Park; St. Louis, MO	L 0–28	6,000	
October 23	Boston College	Sportsman's Park; St. Louis, MO	L 0–61		
October 30	Missouri Mines	Sportsman's Park; St. Louis, MO	W 9–7		
November 6	at Detroit	University of Detroit Stadium; Detroit, MI	L 7–28		
November 13	Loyola (IL)	Sportsman's Park; St. Louis, MO	L 7–13		
November 20	at Oklahoma	Memorial Stadium; Norman, OK	L 0–47		
November 25	South Dakota State	Sportsman's Park; St. Louis, MO	L 0–14		
