= 1926 Central Michigan Dragons football team =

American college football season

1926 Central Michigan Dragons football
- Conference: Independent
- Record: 3–4–1
- Head coach: Wallace Parker (4th season)
- Home stadium: Island Park

1926 Midwestern college football independents records
	Conf.			Overall
Team	W	L	T	W		L		T
Haskell		–		12	–	0	–	1
No. 3 Notre Dame		–		9	–	1	–	0
Western State Normal		–		7	–	1	–	0
Michigan State Normal		–		6	–	1	–	0
Muncie Normal		–		5	–	1	–	1
Northern Illinois State		–		5	–	1	–	1
Marquette		–		6	–	3	–	0
Lombard		–		5	–	3	–	0
Loyola (IL)		–		4	–	3	–	0
Central Michigan		–		3	–	4	–	1
Michigan State		–		3	–	4	–	1
Detroit		–		3	–	6	–	1
Butler		–		3	–	6	–	0
Saint Louis		–		3	–	6	–	0
John Carroll		–		2	–	5	–	1
Kent State		–		2	–	6	–	0
Valparaiso		–		1	–	4	–	1
Michigan Mines		–		0	–	2	–	1
Rankings from Dickinson System

The 1926 Central Michigan Dragons football team represented Central Michigan Normal School, later renamed Central Michigan University, as an independent during the 1926 college football season. In their fourth non-consecutive season under head coach Wallace Parker, Central Michigan compiled a 3–4–1 record (1–1 against MCC opponents) opponents and were outscored by their opponents by a combined total of 90 to 66. The team lost to its in-state rival Michigan State Normal (0–41) and defeated Detroit City College (9-0).

Wallace Parker was hired as the team's head football coach in June 1925, following the resignation of Lester Barnard. A graduate of the Springfield YMCA Training School, Parker had been the football coach at Central Michigan from 1921 to 1923, but he left in 1924 to coach at North Carolina A&M.

== Schedule ==
Date	Opponent	Site	Result	Attendance	Source
October 2	at Albion	Albion, MI	L 14–20	2,000	
October 9	at Ferris Institute	Big Rapids, MI	L 6–7		
October 16	Northern State Teachers	Mount Pleasant, MI	W 24–7		
October 23	Michigan State Normal^{†}	Mount Pleasant, MI (rivalry)	L 0–41		
October 30	at Bowling Green	Bowling Green, OH	L 0–13		
November 11	Alma	Island Park; Mount Pleasant, MI	W 13–2		
November 13	Battle Creek College	Mount Pleasant, MI	T 0–0		
November 25	at Detroit City College	Codd Field; Detroit, MI	W 9–0		
^{†}Homecoming
