= 1926 Kent State Silver Foxes football team =

American college football season

1926 Kent State Silver Foxes football
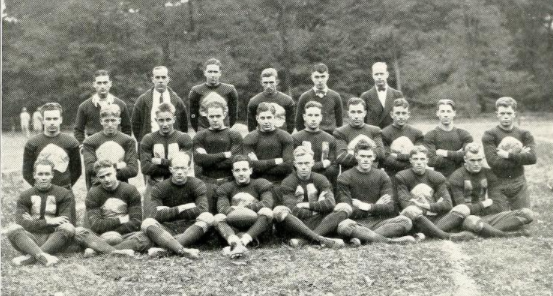
- Conference: Independent
- Record: 2–6
- Head coach: Merle E. Wagoner (2nd season)
- Captain: Donald Menough
- Home stadium: Rockwell Field

1926 Midwestern college football independents records
| | Conf. | | | Overall |
| Team | W | L | T | W | | L | | T |
|---|---|---|---|---|---|---|---|---|
| Haskell | | – | | 12 | – | 0 | – | 1 |
| No. 3 Notre Dame | | – | | 9 | – | 1 | – | 0 |
| Western State Normal | | – | | 7 | – | 1 | – | 0 |
| Michigan State Normal | | – | | 6 | – | 1 | – | 0 |
| Muncie Normal | | – | | 5 | – | 1 | – | 1 |
| Northern Illinois State | | – | | 5 | – | 1 | – | 1 |
| Marquette | | – | | 6 | – | 3 | – | 0 |
| Lombard | | – | | 5 | – | 3 | – | 0 |
| Loyola (IL) | | – | | 4 | – | 3 | – | 0 |
| Central Michigan | | – | | 3 | – | 4 | – | 1 |
| Michigan State | | – | | 3 | – | 4 | – | 1 |
| Detroit | | – | | 3 | – | 6 | – | 1 |
| Butler | | – | | 3 | – | 6 | – | 0 |
| Saint Louis | | – | | 3 | – | 6 | – | 0 |
| John Carroll | | – | | 2 | – | 5 | – | 1 |
| Kent State | | – | | 2 | – | 6 | – | 0 |
| Valparaiso | | – | | 1 | – | 4 | – | 1 |
| Michigan Mines | | – | | 0 | – | 2 | – | 1 |
Rankings from Dickinson System

The 1926 Kent State Silver Foxes football team represented Kent State during the 1926 college football season. In its second season under head coach Merle E. Wagoner, Kent State compiled a 2–6 record and was outscored by a total of 176 to 35.

In the final game of the season, the Silver Foxes gave up two first-quarter touchdowns to Wilmington College. Kent State came back with touchdowns by Searle and Schwartz, but the extra points were missed and the Silver Foxes trailed, 14-12. With one minute remaining in the game, Joe DeLeone drop-kicked the game-winning field goal. Kent State won by a 15-14 score.

== Schedule ==
| Date | Opponent | Site | Result | Source |
|---|---|---|---|---|
| September 25 | at Wittenberg | Springfield, OH | L 0–27 | |
| October 9 | West Liberty State Normal | Rockwell Field; Kent, OH | L 2–25 | |
| October 16 | at Heidelberg | Tiffin, OH | L 0–25 | |
| October 23 | at Ashland | Ashland, OH | L 0–55 | |
| October 30 | Edinboro | Rockwell Field; Kent, OH | W 12–0 | |
| November 6 | at Findlay | Findlay, OH | L 6–7 | |
| November 13 | Indiana Normal (PA)^{†} | Rockwell Field; Kent, OH | L 0–23 | |
| November 20 | Wilmington | Rockwell Field; Kent, OH | W 15–14 | |
^{†}Homecoming

== Roster ==
The following 24 players received varsity letters for their participation in the 1926 football team:

- Colville, senior
- Feeley, senior
- Rogers, senior
- Peterka, senior
- Williamson, senior
- Gandee, senior
- Schwartz, senior
- Donald Menough, Ravenna, Ohio, junior, captain
- Burkett, junior
- Levering, junior
- C. Davis, junior
- Chernin, junior
- Thomas, junior
- A. Davis, junior
- Vair, sophomore
- Curtiss, sophomore
- Searl, sophomore
- R. Hall, sophomore
- Spanlger, sophomore
- Graber, sophomore
- McDermott, sophomore
- Dunlavy, sophomore
- Kelso, freshman
- M. McDermott, freshman
