= 1926 Michigan State Spartans football team =

American college football season

1926 Michigan State Spartans football
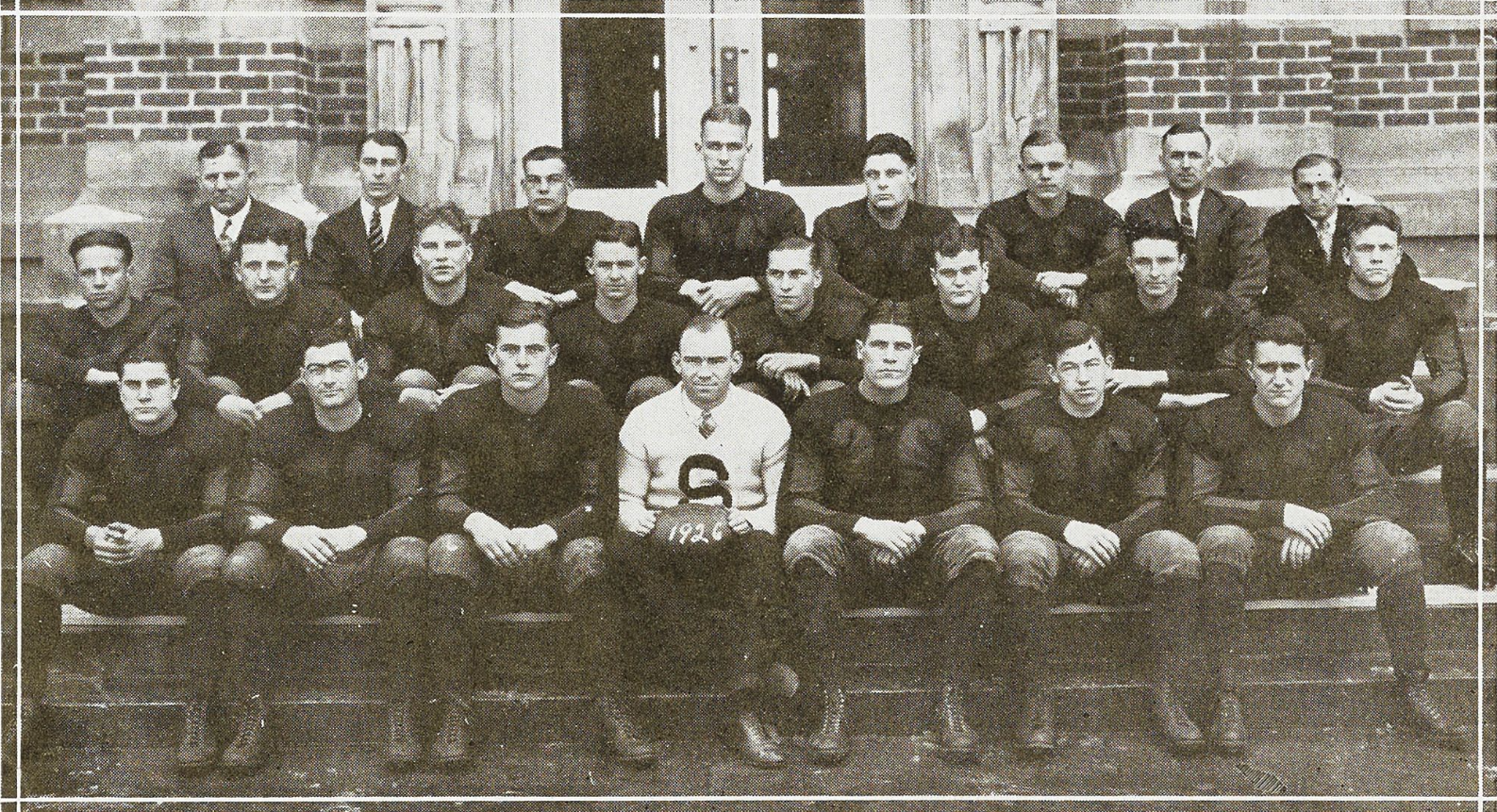
- Conference: Independent
- Record: 3–4–1
- Head coach: Ralph H. Young (4th season)
- Captain: Martin F. Rummel
- Home stadium: College Field

1926 Midwestern college football independents records
	Conf.			Overall
Team	W	L	T	W		L		T
Haskell		–		12	–	0	–	1
No. 3 Notre Dame		–		9	–	1	–	0
Western State Normal		–		7	–	1	–	0
Michigan State Normal		–		6	–	1	–	0
Muncie Normal		–		5	–	1	–	1
Northern Illinois State		–		5	–	1	–	1
Marquette		–		6	–	3	–	0
Lombard		–		5	–	3	–	0
Loyola (IL)		–		4	–	3	–	0
Central Michigan		–		3	–	4	–	1
Michigan State		–		3	–	4	–	1
Detroit		–		3	–	6	–	1
Butler		–		3	–	6	–	0
Saint Louis		–		3	–	6	–	0
John Carroll		–		2	–	5	–	1
Kent State		–		2	–	6	–	0
Valparaiso		–		1	–	4	–	1
Michigan Mines		–		0	–	2	–	1
Rankings from Dickinson System

The 1926 Michigan State Spartans football team represented Michigan State College as an independent during the 1926 college football season. In their fourth year under head coach Ralph H. Young, the Spartans compiled a 3–4–1 record and were outscored by their opponents 171 to 97.

== Schedule ==
Date	Opponent	Site	Result	Attendance	Source
September 26	Adrian	College Field; East Lansing, MI	W 16–0		
October 2	Kalamazoo	College Field; East Lansing, MI	W 9–0		
October 9	at Michigan	Ferry Field; Ann Arbor, MI (rivalry)	L 3–55	33,000	
October 16	at Cornell	Schoellkopf Field; Ithaca, NY	L 14–24		
October 23	Lake Forest	College Field; East Lansing, MI	T 0–0		
October 30	at Colgate	Whitnall Field; Hamilton, NY	L 6–38	5,000	
November 6	Centre^{†}	College Field; East Lansing, MI	W 42–14		
November 20	Haskell	College Field; East Lansing, MI	L 7–40		
^{†}Homecoming

== Game summaries ==
=== Michigan ===
On October 9, 1926, Michigan State lost to Michigan by a 55–3 score.
