= 1926 Detroit Titans football team =

American college football season

1926 Detroit Titans football
- Conference: Independent
- Record: 3–6–1
- Head coach: Gus Dorais (2nd season)
- Home stadium: University of Detroit Stadium

1926 Midwestern college football independents records
	Conf.			Overall
Team	W	L	T	W		L		T
Haskell		–		12	–	0	–	1
No. 3 Notre Dame		–		9	–	1	–	0
Western State Normal		–		7	–	1	–	0
Michigan State Normal		–		6	–	1	–	0
Muncie Normal		–		5	–	1	–	1
Northern Illinois State		–		5	–	1	–	1
Marquette		–		6	–	3	–	0
Lombard		–		5	–	3	–	0
Loyola (IL)		–		4	–	3	–	0
Central Michigan		–		3	–	4	–	1
Michigan State		–		3	–	4	–	1
Detroit		–		3	–	6	–	1
Butler		–		3	–	6	–	0
Saint Louis		–		3	–	6	–	0
John Carroll		–		2	–	5	–	1
Kent State		–		2	–	6	–	0
Valparaiso		–		1	–	4	–	1
Michigan Mines		–		0	–	2	–	1
Rankings from Dickinson System

The 1926 Detroit Titans football team represented the University of Detroit in the 1926 college football season. Detroit was outscored by opponents by a combined total of 132 to 62 and finished with a 3–6–1 record in their second year under head coach and College Football Hall of Fame inductee, Gus Dorais.

== Schedule ==
Date	Opponent	Site	Result	Attendance	Source
September 25	Alma	University of Detroit Stadium; Detroit, MI	W 14–6		
October 2	at Army	Michie Stadium; West Point, NY	L 0–21		
October 9	Lombard	University of Detroit Stadium; Detroit, MI	W 6–0		
October 16	at Loyola (LA)	New Orleans, LA	L 0–38	6,000	
October 23	John Carroll	University of Detroit Stadium; Detroit, MI	T 7–7		
October 30	Carnegie Tech	University of Detroit Stadium; Detroit, MI	L 0–7		
November 6	Saint Louis	University of Detroit Stadium; Detroit, MI	W 28–7		
November 13	Quantico Marines	University of Detroit Stadium; Detroit, MI	L 7–24		
November 20	South Dakota State	University of Detroit Stadium; Detroit, MI	L 0–3		
November 27	Georgetown	University of Detroit Stadium; Detroit, MI	L 0–19		
