= Bownd =

Bownd is a surname. Notable people with the name are:

- Nicholas Bownd, English clergyman
- William Bownd, Welsh Baptist minister

== See also ==
- Bound (surname)
- Bounds (surname)
- Bownds
