= Bound (surname) =

Bound is a surname. Notable people with the surname include:

- Franklin Bound (1829–1910), American politician
- John Bound, American labor economist
- Matthew Bound (born 1972), English footballer
- Mensun Bound (born 1953), marine archaeologist from the Falkland Islands

== See also ==
- Bounds (surname)
- Bownd
- Bownds
