= 1926 Marquette Golden Avalanche football team =

American college football season

1926 Marquette Golden Avalanche football
- Conference: Independent
- Record: 6–3
- Head coach: Frank Murray (5th season)
- Home stadium: Marquette Stadium

1926 Midwestern college football independents records
	Conf.			Overall
Team	W	L	T	W		L		T
Haskell		–		12	–	0	–	1
No. 3 Notre Dame		–		9	–	1	–	0
Western State Normal		–		7	–	1	–	0
Michigan State Normal		–		6	–	1	–	0
Muncie Normal		–		5	–	1	–	1
Northern Illinois State		–		5	–	1	–	1
Marquette		–		6	–	3	–	0
Lombard		–		5	–	3	–	0
Loyola (IL)		–		4	–	3	–	0
Central Michigan		–		3	–	4	–	1
Michigan State		–		3	–	4	–	1
Detroit		–		3	–	6	–	1
Butler		–		3	–	6	–	0
Saint Louis		–		3	–	6	–	0
John Carroll		–		2	–	5	–	1
Kent State		–		2	–	6	–	0
Valparaiso		–		1	–	4	–	1
Michigan Mines		–		0	–	2	–	1
Rankings from Dickinson System

The 1926 Marquette Golden Avalanche football team was an American football team that represented Marquette University as an independent during the 1926 college football season. In its fifth season under head coach Frank Murray, the team compiled a 6–3 record.

== Schedule ==
Date	Opponent	Site	Result	Attendance	Source
October 2	at Lawrence	Appleton, WI	W 10–6		
October 9	Grinnell	Marquette Stadium; Milwaukee, WI	L 2–17	4,500	
October 16	at Saint Louis	Sportsman's Park; St. Louis, MO	W 28–0	6,000	
October 23	Saint Mary's (MN)	Marquette Stadium; Milwaukee, WI	W 46–0	5,000	
October 30	at Creighton	Creighton Stadium; Omaha, NE	W 21–0	10,000	
November 6	Kansas State	Marquette Stadium; Milwaukee, WI	W 14–0		
November 13	at Auburn	Rickwood Field; Birmingham, AL	W 19–3		
November 20	North Dakota	Marquette Stadium; Milwaukee, WI	L 6–9	3,000	
November 25	Oregon Agricultural	Marquette Stadium; Milwaukee, WI	L 0–29	15,000	
