= 1926 Northern Illinois State Teachers football team =

American college football season

1926 Northern Illinois State Teachers football
- Conference: Independent
- Record: 5–1–1
- Head coach: Roland Cowell (1st season)
- Captain: Wesley Cocidine
- Home stadium: Glidden Field

1926 Midwestern college football independents records
	Conf.			Overall
Team	W	L	T	W		L		T
Haskell		–		12	–	0	–	1
No. 3 Notre Dame		–		9	–	1	–	0
Western State Normal		–		7	–	1	–	0
Michigan State Normal		–		6	–	1	–	0
Muncie Normal		–		5	–	1	–	1
Northern Illinois State		–		5	–	1	–	1
Marquette		–		6	–	3	–	0
Lombard		–		5	–	3	–	0
Loyola (IL)		–		4	–	3	–	0
Central Michigan		–		3	–	4	–	1
Michigan State		–		3	–	4	–	1
Detroit		–		3	–	6	–	1
Butler		–		3	–	6	–	0
Saint Louis		–		3	–	6	–	0
John Carroll		–		2	–	5	–	1
Kent State		–		2	–	6	–	0
Valparaiso		–		1	–	4	–	1
Michigan Mines		–		0	–	2	–	1
Rankings from Dickinson System

The 1926 Northern Illinois State Teachers football team represented Northern Illinois State Teachers College—now known as Northern Illinois University—as an independent during the 1926 college football season. Led by first-year head coach Roland Cowell, the Teachers compiled a record of 5–1–1 record. Northern Illinois State played home games at Glidden Field, located on the east end of campus in DeKalb, Illinois.Wesley Cocidine was the team's captain.

== Schedule ==
Date	Time	Opponent	Site	Result	Source
October 2		American College of PE	Glidden Field; DeKalb, IL	W 9–0	
October 9		at St. Bede's	Peru, IL	T 7–7	
October 23		at Columbia (IA)	Dubuque, IA	L 0–19	
October 30		Elmhurst	Glidden Field; DeKalb, IL	W 32–0	
November 6	2:30 p.m.	Wisconsin Mines	Glidden Field; DeKalb, IL	W 14–0	
November 13		Indiana State	Glidden Field; DeKalb, IL	W 3–0	
November 20		Crane Tech	Glidden Field; DeKalb, IL	W 6–0	
All times are in Central time
