= Bounds (surname) =

Bounds is a surname. Notable people with the surname include:

- Bobby Bounds (born 1969), American football player
- Dallen Bounds (1971–1999), American serial killer
- Dennis Bounds (born 1977), American news anchor
- Jon Bounds (born 1975), English blogger
- Mark Bounds, American football player
- Philip Bounds, British historian
- Sydney James Bounds (1920–2006), English author
- Tucker Bounds, American politician

== See also ==
- Bownds
- Bownd
- Bound (surname)
