= 1926 Haskell Indians football team =

American college football season

1926 Haskell Indians football
- Conference: Independent
- Record: 12–0–1
- Head coach: Dick Hanley (5th season)
- Captain: Thomas E. Stidham
- Home stadium: Haskell Stadium

1926 Midwestern college football independents records
	Conf.			Overall
Team	W	L	T	W		L		T
Haskell		–		12	–	0	–	1
No. 3 Notre Dame		–		9	–	1	–	0
Western State Normal		–		7	–	1	–	0
Michigan State Normal		–		6	–	1	–	0
Muncie Normal		–		5	–	1	–	1
Northern Illinois State		–		5	–	1	–	1
Marquette		–		6	–	3	–	0
Lombard		–		5	–	3	–	0
Loyola (IL)		–		4	–	3	–	0
Central Michigan		–		3	–	4	–	1
Michigan State		–		3	–	4	–	1
Detroit		–		3	–	6	–	1
Butler		–		3	–	6	–	0
Saint Louis		–		3	–	6	–	0
John Carroll		–		2	–	5	–	1
Kent State		–		2	–	6	–	0
Valparaiso		–		1	–	4	–	1
Michigan Mines		–		0	–	2	–	1
Rankings from Dickinson System

The 1926 Haskell Indians football team was an American football that represented the Haskell Institute (now known as Haskell Indian Nations University) as an independent during the 1926 college football season. With players from 18 different tribes, the team compiled a 12–0–1 record and outscored opponents by a total of 558 to 64. The team's 558 points was the most scored by any college football team in many years.

Despite missing two games, All-American fullback Mayes McLain, an Irish-Cherokee youth, set all-time single-season records that have never been broken. These records include 38 rushing touchdowns, 253 points scored (38 touchdowns, 19 extra points, and two field goals), and a scoring average of 23 points per game. He also set a single-game scoring record with 55 points (eight touchdowns and seven extra points) against Wichita.

Other key players included tackle and team captain Tom Stidham, All-American tackle Theodore "Tiny" Roebuck, center Albert Hawley, end Joe Pappio, quarterback Egbert Ward, and halfbacks George Levi and Elijah Smith.

Prior to the 1926 season, Haskell built its own football stadium, Haskell Memorial Stadium, at a cost of approximately $200,000. On October 30, the stadium was formally dedicated with a 36–0 victory over Bucknell.

On December 15, prior to the Rose Bowl, Haskell had a scrimmage with Stanford's second team and won, scoring four touchdowns to Stanford's three.

== Schedule ==
Date	Time	Opponent	Site	Result	Attendance	Source
September 18		Drury	Haskell Stadium; Lawrence, KS	W 65–0		
September 25		at Wichita	Wichita KS	W 57–0		
October 1		Still	Haskell Stadium; Lawrence, KS	W 55–0		
October 9		Morningside	Haskell Stadium; Lawrence, KS	W 38–0	300	
October 16		at Dayton	Dayton, OH	W 30–14	10,000	
October 21		Jackson (MO)	Haskell Stadium; Lawrence, KS	W 95–0		
October 30		Bucknell	Haskell Stadium; Lawrence, KS	W 36–0		
November 6		Loyola (IL)	Muehlebach Field; Kansas City, MO	W 27–7		
November 13	2:00 p.m.	at Boston College	Braves Field; Boston, MA	T 21–21		
November 20		at Michigan State	College Field; East Lansing, MI	W 40–7		
November 25		at St. Xavier	Corcoran Field; Cincinnati, OH	W 27–0	12,000	
December 4		at Tulsa	Tulsa, OK	W 27–7	8,000	
December 18		vs. Honolulu Town Team	Kezar Stadium; San Francisco, CA	W 40–7	700	
