= 1926 Michigan State Normal Normalites football team =

American college football season

1926 Michigan State Normal Normalites football
- Conference: Independent
- Record: 6–1
- Head coach: Elton Rynearson (5th season)
- Captain: Harry Ockerman

1926 Midwestern college football independents records
	Conf.			Overall
Team	W	L	T	W		L		T
Haskell		–		12	–	0	–	1
No. 3 Notre Dame		–		9	–	1	–	0
Western State Normal		–		7	–	1	–	0
Michigan State Normal		–		6	–	1	–	0
Muncie Normal		–		5	–	1	–	1
Northern Illinois State		–		5	–	1	–	1
Marquette		–		6	–	3	–	0
Lombard		–		5	–	3	–	0
Loyola (IL)		–		4	–	3	–	0
Central Michigan		–		3	–	4	–	1
Michigan State		–		3	–	4	–	1
Detroit		–		3	–	6	–	1
Butler		–		3	–	6	–	0
Saint Louis		–		3	–	6	–	0
John Carroll		–		2	–	5	–	1
Kent State		–		2	–	6	–	0
Valparaiso		–		1	–	4	–	1
Michigan Mines		–		0	–	2	–	1
Rankings from Dickinson System

The 1926 Michigan State Normal Normalites football team was an American football team that represented Michigan State Normal College (later renamed Eastern Michigan University) as an independent during the 1926 college football season. In their fifth season under head coach Elton Rynearson, the Normalites compiled a 6–1 record, shut out six of their seven opponents, and outscored all opponents by a total of 113 to 12. Harry Ockerman was the team captain.

On October 16, 1926, the Hurons began a 13-game winning streak that continued through the 1927 season. It remains tied for the longest winning streak in program history.

== Schedule ==
Date	Opponent	Site	Result	Source
October 2	Detroit freshmen	Ypsilanti, MI	W 6–0	
October 9	at Alma	Alma, MI	L 0–12	
October 16	at Detroit City College	College Field; Detroit, MI	W 6–0	
October 23	at Central Michigan	Tambling Field; Mount Pleasant, MI (rivalry)	W 41–0	
October 30	at Ferris Institute	Big Rapids, MI	W 21–0	
November 6	Olivet	Ypsilanti, MI	W 20–0	
November 20	Kalamazoo ^{†}	Ypsilanti, MI	W 19–0	
^{†}Homecoming
