= 1926 Loyola Ramblers football team =

American college football season

1926 Loyola Ramblers football
- Conference: Independent
- Record: 4–3
- Head coach: Roger Kiley (4th season)
- Home stadium: Loyola Field; Wrigley Field

1926 Midwestern college football independents records
	Conf.			Overall
Team	W	L	T	W		L		T
Haskell		–		12	–	0	–	1
No. 3 Notre Dame		–		9	–	1	–	0
Western State Normal		–		7	–	1	–	0
Michigan State Normal		–		6	–	1	–	0
Muncie Normal		–		5	–	1	–	1
Northern Illinois State		–		5	–	1	–	1
Marquette		–		6	–	3	–	0
Lombard		–		5	–	3	–	0
Loyola (IL)		–		4	–	3	–	0
Central Michigan		–		3	–	4	–	1
Michigan State		–		3	–	4	–	1
Detroit		–		3	–	6	–	1
Butler		–		3	–	6	–	0
Saint Louis		–		3	–	6	–	0
John Carroll		–		2	–	5	–	1
Kent State		–		2	–	6	–	0
Valparaiso		–		1	–	4	–	1
Michigan Mines		–		0	–	2	–	1
Rankings from Dickinson System

The 1926 Loyola Ramblers football team was an American football team that represented Loyola University Chicago as an independent during the 1926 college football season. Led by Roger Kiley in his fourth season as head coach, the Ramblers compiled an overall record of 4–3.

== Schedule ==
Date	Opponent	Site	Result	Attendance	Source
October 2	St. Viator	Loyola Field; Chicago, IL	W 21–6		
October 9	St. Thomas (MN)	Loyola Field; Chicago, IL	W 27–0	3,000	
October 16	at Ole Miss	Hemingway Stadium; Oxford, MS	L 7–13		
November 6	vs. Haskell	Muehlebach Field; Kansas City, MO	L 7–27		
November 13	at Saint Louis	Sportsman's Park; St. Louis, MO	W 13–7		
November 20	Arkansas Tech	Wrigley Field; Chicago, IL	W 7–0		
November 27	at Loyola (LA)	Loyola University Stadium; New Orleans, LA	L 14–40	8,000	
