= 1926 Notre Dame Fighting Irish football team =

American college football season

1926 Notre Dame Fighting Irish football
- Conference: Independent
- Record: 9–1
- Head coach: Knute Rockne (9th season)
- Offensive scheme: Notre Dame Box
- Base defense: 7–2–2
- Captains: Red Edwards; Tom Hearden
- Home stadium: Cartier Field

1926 Midwestern college football independents records
	Conf.			Overall
Team	W	L	T	W		L		T
Haskell		–		12	–	0	–	1
No. 3 Notre Dame		–		9	–	1	–	0
Western State Normal		–		7	–	1	–	0
Michigan State Normal		–		6	–	1	–	0
Muncie Normal		–		5	–	1	–	1
Northern Illinois State		–		5	–	1	–	1
Marquette		–		6	–	3	–	0
Lombard		–		5	–	3	–	0
Loyola (IL)		–		4	–	3	–	0
Central Michigan		–		3	–	4	–	1
Michigan State		–		3	–	4	–	1
Detroit		–		3	–	6	–	1
Butler		–		3	–	6	–	0
Saint Louis		–		3	–	6	–	0
John Carroll		–		2	–	5	–	1
Kent State		–		2	–	6	–	0
Valparaiso		–		1	–	4	–	1
Michigan Mines		–		0	–	2	–	1
Rankings from Dickinson System

The 1926 Notre Dame Fighting Irish football team was an American football team that represented the University of Notre Dame as an independent during the 1926 college football season. In their ninth year under head coach Knute Rockne, the Irish compiled a 9–1 record, shut out seven of ten opponents, and outscored all opponents by a total of 210 to 38. The team was ranked No. 3 in the nation in the Dickinson System ratings released in December 1926.

The team's victories included shutouts over Penn State, Northwestern, Georgia Tech, Indiana, and Army, and a 13–12 victory over USC. The sole loss was a 19–0 upset on the road against Carnegie Tech in the penultimate game of the season. Rockne did not attend the Carnegie Tech game, deeming it "not important enough"; Rockne instead attended the Army-Navy game to write a syndicated article about that game and to aid him in making his All-America selections.

Notre Dame center Bud Boeringer was selected as a consensus first-team player on the 1926 All-America college football team. Halfback Christie Flanagan also received first-team All-America honors from Ed Sullivan (then a New York sports writer) and second-team honors from several other selectors.

The Irish wore green uniforms in their game against Penn State. They played their home games at Cartier Field in Notre Dame, Indiana.

== Schedule ==
Date	Opponent	Site	Result	Attendance	Source
October 2	Beloit	Cartier Field; Notre Dame, IN	W 77–0	8,000	
October 9	at Minnesota	Memorial Stadium; Minneapolis, MN	W 20–7	48,648–54,000	
October 16	Penn State	Cartier Field; Notre Dame, IN (rivalry)	W 28–0	18,000	
October 23	at Northwestern	Dyche Stadium; Evanston, IL (rivalry)	W 6–0	41,000	
October 30	Georgia Tech	Cartier Field; Notre Dame, IN (rivalry)	W 12–0	11,000	
November 6	Indiana	Cartier Field; Notre Dame, IN	W 26–0	20,000	
November 13	vs. Army	Yankee Stadium; Bronx, NY (rivalry)	W 7–0	63,029	
November 20	Drake	Cartier Field; Notre Dame, IN	W 21–0	15,000	
November 27	at Carnegie Tech	Forbes Field; Pittsburgh, PA	L 0–19	45,000	
December 4	at USC	Los Angeles Memorial Coliseum; Los Angeles, CA (rivalry)	W 13–12	74,378	
