= 1926 Creighton Bluejays football team =

American college football season

1926 Creighton Bluejays football
- Conference: North Central Conference
- Record: 4–4–1 (=2–1–1 NCC)
- Head coach: Chet A. Wynne (4th season)
- Home stadium: Creighton Stadium

1926 North Central Conference football standings
	Conf.					Overall
Team	W		L		T	W		L		T
South Dakota State $	3	–	0	–	2	8	–	1	–	3
South Dakota	3	–	1	–	1	5	–	3	–	1
Morningside	2	–	1	–	0	6	–	2	–	0
Creighton	2	–	2	–	1	4	–	4	–	1
North Dakota	3	–	2	–	0	4	–	4	–	0
North Dakota Agricultural	2	–	3	–	0	5	–	3	–	0
Des Moines	1	–	4	–	0	2	–	7	–	0
Nebraska Wesleyan	0	–	3	–	0	6	–	4	–	0
$ – Conference champion

The 1926 Creighton Bluejays football team was an American football team that represented Creighton University as a member of the North Central Conference (NCC) during the 1926 college football season. In its fourth season under head coach Chet A. Wynne, the team compiled a 4–4–1 record (2–1–1 against NCC opponents) and equaled the scoring of its opponents with 107 point scored and 107 points allowed. The team played its home games at Creighton Stadium in Omaha, Nebraska.

== Schedule ==
Date	Opponent	Site	Result	Attendance	Source
September 25	Des Moines	Creighton Stadium; Omaha, NE	W 25–2		
October 2	North Dakota Agricultural	Creighton Stadium; Omaha, NE	W 26–13		
October 9	Kansas State	Creighton Stadium; Omaha, NE	L 0–12		
October 16	John Carroll	Creighton Stadium; Omaha, NE	W 22–12		
October 30	Marquette^{†}	Creighton Stadium; Omaha, NE	L 0–21	10,000	
November 6	at Regis	Denver, CO	W 26–21		
November 13	South Dakota State	Creighton Stadium; Omaha, NE	T 8–8		
November 19	South Dakota	Creighton Stadium; Omaha, NE	L 0–6		
November 25	Idaho	Creighton Stadium; Omaha, NE	L 0–12		
^{†}Homecoming
