= 1926 South Dakota State Jackrabbits football team =

American college football season

1926 South Dakota State Jackrabbits football

NCC champion
- Conference: North Central Conference
- Record: 8–0–3 (3–0–2 NCC)
- Head coach: Charles A. West (8th season)

1926 North Central Conference football standings
	Conf.					Overall
Team	W		L		T	W		L		T
South Dakota State $	3	–	0	–	2	8	–	1	–	3
South Dakota	3	–	1	–	1	5	–	3	–	1
Morningside	2	–	1	–	0	6	–	2	–	0
Creighton	2	–	2	–	1	4	–	4	–	1
North Dakota	3	–	2	–	0	4	–	4	–	0
North Dakota Agricultural	2	–	3	–	0	5	–	3	–	0
Des Moines	1	–	4	–	0	2	–	7	–	0
Nebraska Wesleyan	0	–	3	–	0	6	–	4	–	0
$ – Conference champion

The 1926 South Dakota State Jackrabbits football team was an American football team that represented South Dakota State College in the North Central Conference (NCC) during the 1926 college football season. In its eighth season under head coach Charles A. West, the team compiled an 8–0–3 record, won the NCC championship, shut out seven of eleven opponents, and outscored all opponents by a total of 157 to 24.

== Schedule ==
Date	Time	Opponent	Site	Result	Attendance	Source
September 25		Columbus (SD)	Brookings, SD	T 7–7		
October 2		Huron*	Brookings, SD	W 35–0		
October 9		Buena Vista*	Brookings, SD	W 33–0		
October 16		North Dakota Agricultural	Brookings, SD (rivalry)	W 21–0		
October 23		at North Dakota	Grand Forks, ND	W 6–0		
October 30		South Dakota	Brookings, SD (Hobo Day, rivalry)	T 0–0		
November 6		at Morningside	Sioux City, IA	W 21–6		
November 13		at Creighton	Creighton Stadium; Omaha, NE	T 8–8		
November 20		at Detroit*	University of Detroit Stadium; Detroit, MI	W 3–0		
November 25		at Saint Louis*	Sportsman's Park; St. Louis, MO	W 14–0		
December 25	6:30 p.m.	at Hawaii*	Honolulu Stadium; Honolulu, Territory of Hawaii	W 9–2	12,000	
January 1		at Honolulu town team*	Honolulu Stadium; Honolulu, Territory of Hawaii	L 12–13 (exhibition?)		
*Non-conference game; All times are in Central time

== Roster ==
Sixteen players received varsity letters for their participation on the 1926 team:

- Howard Biegert, Montevideo, MN, quarterback
- Arnold Brevik, Gary, SD, guard
- Martin Carlisle, Brookings, SD, halfback
- Arthur Eggers, Wagner, SD, end
- Bob Ekem, Flandreau, SD, tackle
- George Frandsen, Plankinton, SD, quarterback
- Leslie Harding, Montevideo, MN, halfback
- John Johnson, Brookings, SD, end
- Frank Kelley, Tyndall, SD, halfback
- Harry Krug, Madison, SD, end
- Walter Parmeter, Westport, SD, fullback
- Louis Schugel, New Ulm, SD, tackle
- Leo Schweinfurt, Tracy, MN, fullback
- George Seeley, Rosholt, SD, guard
- Clyde Starbeck, Montevideo, MN, center
- Wolters, Watertown, SD, tackle
