= Ion Cortright =

American football player and sports coach (1889–1961)

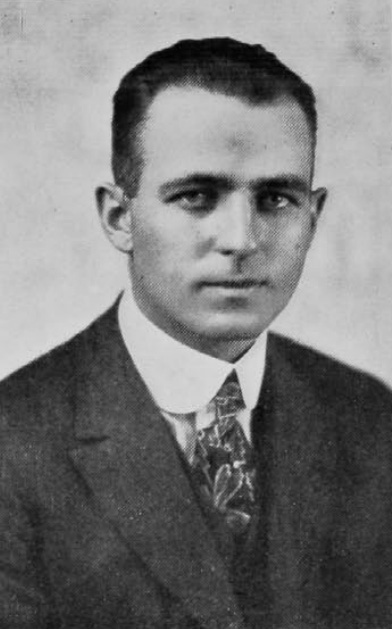
- Cortright pictured in The Cincinnatian 1917, Cincinnati yearbook

Biographical details
- Born: June 29, 1889; Eaton County, Michigan, U.S.
- Died: June 3, 1961 (aged 71); East Lansing, Michigan, U.S.

Playing career

Football
- 1907–1910: Michigan Agricultural
- Position: Halfback

Coaching career (HC unless noted)

Football
- 1911–1913: Michigan Agricultural (assistant)
- 1914–1915: South Dakota
- 1916: Cincinnati
- 1925–1927: North Dakota Agricultural

Basketball
- 1914–1915: South Dakota
- 1916–1917: Cincinnati
- 1925–1926: North Dakota Agricultural

Head coaching record
- Overall: 22–20–6 (football); 38–14 (basketball)

Accomplishments and honors

Championships
- Football; 1 NCC (1925)

Ion John Cortright (June 29, 1889 – June 3, 1961) was an American football player and coach of football and basketball. He served as the head football coach at the University of South Dakota (1914–1915), the University of Cincinnati (1916), and North Dakota Agricultural College, now North Dakota State University, (1925–1927), compiling a career college football record of 22–20–6. Cortright was also the head basketball coach at South Dakota for one season in 1914–15, Cincinnati for one season in 1916–17, and North Dakota Agricultural for one season in 1925–26, tallying a career mark of 38–14.

== Head coaching record ==
=== Football ===
| Year | Team | Overall | Conference | Standing | Bowl/playoffs |
|---|---|---|---|---|---|
South Dakota Coyotes (Independent) (1914–1915)
| 1914 | South Dakota | 5–2–1 | | | |
| 1915 | South Dakota | 4–2–2 | | | |
| South Dakota: | | 9–4–3 | | | |
Cincinnati Bearcats (Ohio Athletic Conference) (1916)
| 1916 | Cincinnati | 0–8–1 | 0–6–1 | 13th | |
| Cincinnati: | | 0–8–1 | 0–6–1 | | |
North Dakota Agricultural Bison (North Central Conference) (1925–1927)
| 1925 | North Dakota Agricultural | 5–0–2 | 4–0–2 | T–1st | |
| 1926 | North Dakota Agricultural | 5–3 | 2–3 | 6th | |
| 1927 | North Dakota Agricultural | 3–5 | 1–3 | 5th | |
| North Dakota Agricultural: | | 13–8–2 | 7–6–2 | | |
| Total: | | 22–20–6 | | | |
National championship Conference title Conference division title or championship game berth
