= 1926 North Dakota Flickertails football team =

American college football season

1926 North Dakota Flickertails football
- Conference: North Central Conference
- Record: 4–4 (2–2 NCC)
- Head coach: Tod Rockwell (1st season)

1926 North Central Conference football standings
	Conf.					Overall
Team	W		L		T	W		L		T
South Dakota State $	3	–	0	–	2	8	–	1	–	3
South Dakota	3	–	1	–	1	5	–	3	–	1
Morningside	2	–	1	–	0	6	–	2	–	0
Creighton	2	–	2	–	1	4	–	4	–	1
North Dakota	3	–	2	–	0	4	–	4	–	0
North Dakota Agricultural	2	–	3	–	0	5	–	3	–	0
Des Moines	1	–	4	–	0	2	–	7	–	0
Nebraska Wesleyan	0	–	3	–	0	6	–	4	–	0
$ – Conference champion

The 1926 North Dakota Flickertails football team, also known as the Nodaks, was an American football team that represented the University of North Dakota in the North Central Conference (NCC) during the 1926 college football season. In their first year under head coach Tod Rockwell, the Flickertails compiled a 4–4 record (2–2 against NCC opponents), finished in a tie for seventh place out of nine teams in the NCC, and were outscored by a total of 121 to 63.

== Schedule ==
Date	Opponent	Site	Result	Attendance	Source
September 29	Dakota Wesleyan*	Grand Forks, ND	W 7–0		
October 2	at Minnesota*	Memorial Stadium; Minneapolis, MN	L 0–51	18,000	
October 9	at Iowa*	Iowa Field; Iowa City, IA	L 7–40		
October 16	at South Dakota	Vermillion, SD (rivalry)	L 0–12		
October 23	South Dakota State^{†}	Grand Forks, ND	L 0–6		
October 30	Des Moines	Grand Forks, ND	W 33–0		
November 6	at North Dakota Agricultural	Dacotah Field; Fargo, ND (rivalry)	W 7–6	5,000	
November 20	at Marquette*	Marquette Stadium; Milwaukee, WI	W 9–6	3,000	
*Non-conference game; ^{†}Homecoming
