= Constance Hoffman Berman =

American medievalist (born 1948)

- Born: August 17, 1948 (age 78); Canton, Ohio
- Occupation: Medievalist
- Awards: Guggenheim Fellowship (2004)

Academic background
- Education: Carleton College (BA); University of Wisconsin–Madison (MA, PhD)
- Thesis: The Cistercians in the County of Toulouse: 1132-1249, the Order's Foundations and Land Acquisition (1978)

Academic work
- Discipline: Medieval studies
- Sub-discipline: Medieval religion; medieval economics; medieval women
- Institutions: University of Iowa

Constance Hoffman Berman (born August 17, 1948) is an American medievalist. A 2004 Guggenheim Fellow, she has authored and edited several books, including Medieval Agriculture, the Southern French Countryside, and the Early Cistercians (1986), The Cistercian Evolution (2000), Women and Monasticism in Medieval Europe (2002), Medieval Religion: New Approaches (2006), and Sacred Communities, Shared Devotions (2014). She is a professor emeritus of the University of Iowa.

== Biography ==
Constance Hoffman Berman was born on August 17, 1948, in Canton, Ohio. She attended Carleton College, where she became interested in medieval history and obtained a BА in 1970, and the University of Wisconsin–Madison, where she obtained an MA in 1972 and a PhD in 1978. Her doctoral dissertation was titled The Cistercians in the County of Toulouse: 1132-1249, the Order's Foundations and Land Acquisition.

After working as an adjunct assistant professor of history at the Catholic University of America (1981-1983) and as a visiting assistant professor of history in Georgetown University (1983-1984) and Bard College (1984-1985), she joined the University of Iowa in 1988 as an assistant professor of history. She was promoted to associate professor in 1991 and full professor in 1994. She eventually retired as professor emerita.

She has published several authored books and edited volumes in fields like medieval religion, medieval economics, and medieval women, including Medieval Agriculture (1986) and The Cistercian Evolution (2000), Women and Monasticism in Medieval Europe (2002), Medieval Religion: New Approaches (2005), and The White Nuns: Cistercian Abbeys for Women in Medieval France (2018). In 2004, she was awarded a Guggenheim Fellowship for "a study of women's work and European economic expansion, 1050-1250".

She was a 1981 American Philosophical Society Fellow, a 1983 American Council of Learned Societies Fellow in 1983, and a 1988 and 2003 National Endowment for the Humanities Fellow. She was a visiting fellow at Clare Hall, Cambridge (1994-1995), before becoming a life member in 1995. She was a 2000 May Brodbeck Humanities Fellow at UI.

== Works ==
- (ed. with Charles W. Connell and Judith Rice Rothschild) The Worlds of Medieval Women: Creativity, Influence, and Imagination (1985)
- Medieval Agriculture, the Southern French Countryside, and the Early Cistercians: A Study of Forty-three Monasteries (1986) (Note: Reviews of this book:)
- The Cistercian Evolution: The Invention of a Religious Order in Twelfth-Century Europe (2000) (Note: Reviews of this book:)
- (ed.) Women and Monasticism in Medieval Europe: Sisters and Patrons of the Cistercian Reform (2002) (Note: Reviews of this book:)
- (ed.) Medieval Religion: New Approaches (2006)
- (ed. with Alison Beach and Lisa M. Bitel; written by June L. Mecham) Sacred Communities, Shared Devotions: Gender, Material Culture, and Monasticism in Late Medieval Germany (2014) (Note: Reviews of this book:)
