= 1926 South Dakota Coyotes football team =

American college football season

1926 South Dakota Coyotes football
- Conference: North Central Conference
- Record: 5–3–1 (3–1–1 NCC)
- Head coach: Stub Allison (4th season)

1926 North Central Conference football standings
	Conf.					Overall
Team	W		L		T	W		L		T
South Dakota State $	3	–	0	–	2	8	–	1	–	3
South Dakota	3	–	1	–	1	5	–	3	–	1
Morningside	2	–	1	–	0	6	–	2	–	0
Creighton	2	–	2	–	1	4	–	4	–	1
North Dakota	3	–	2	–	0	4	–	4	–	0
North Dakota Agricultural	2	–	3	–	0	5	–	3	–	0
Des Moines	1	–	4	–	0	2	–	7	–	0
Nebraska Wesleyan	0	–	3	–	0	6	–	4	–	0
$ – Conference champion

The 1926 South Dakota Coyotes football team was an American football team that represented the University of South Dakota in the North Central Conference (NCC) during the 1926 college football season. In its fourth season under head coach Stub Allison, the team compiled a 5–3–1 record (3–1–1 against NCC opponents), finished in second place out of eight teams in the NCC, and outscored opponents by a total of 90 to 76.

== Schedule ==
Date	Opponent	Site	Result	Attendance	Source
September 25	Yankton*	Vermillion, SD	W 34–0		
October 2	at Northwestern*	Dyche Stadium; Evanston, IL	L 0–34		
October 9	at Utah*	Cummings Field; Salt Lake City, UT	L 0–13		
October 16	North Dakota	Vermillion, SD (rivalry)	W 12–0		
October 23	Nebraska Wesleyan	Vermillion, SD	W 13–10		
October 30	at South Dakota State	Brookings, SD (rivalry)	T 0–0		
November 6	at Western Union*	Le Mars, IA	W 25–0		
November 13	at Creighton	Creighton Stadium; Omaha, NE	W 6–0		
November 25	at Morningside	Sioux City, IA	L 0–19		
*Non-conference game
