= Alison Beach =

American historian (born 1963)

Alison I. Beach
- Born: Alison Isdale Beach; October 8, 1963 (age 63); New Rochelle, New York, U.S.
- Spouse: David A. Jaeger (m. 1990)
- Awards: Ratner Teaching Award

Academic background
- Education: Columbia University (Ph.D.); Smith College (B.A.)

Academic work
- Discipline: Historian and Archeologist
- Institutions: University of St Andrews, Ohio State University, University of Cologne, College of William and Mary
- Main interests: Medieval History

Alison Isdale Beach (born October 8, 1963) is an American historian and archeologist.

She is a professor of medieval history at the University of St Andrews. She completed her B.A. in history at Smith College in 1985 and her Ph.D. in religion at Columbia University in 1996. She also holds an M.A. in history and an M.Phil. in religion from Columbia University. From 2011 to 2020 she was a professor of history at the Ohio State University. She has also held regular positions at the College of William and Mary and the University of Cologne, and visiting positions at Union Theological Seminary, New Brunswick Theological Seminary, Temple University, and the University of Trier. She is the author of Woman as Scribes: Book Production and Monastic Reform in Twelfth-Century Bavaria (Cambridge University Press, 2004) and The Trauma of Monastic Reform: Community and Conflict in Twelfth-Century Germany (Cambridge University Press, 2017) as well as numerous articles that explore the history of monasticism in medieval Europe. She is a founding member of the Arbeitskreis geistliche Frauen im europäischen Mittelalter (AGFEM). With Isabelle Cochelin, she edited the two-volume Cambridge History of Medieval Monasticism in the Latin West (Cambridge University Press, 2020).

Alison Beach was a Fulbright recipient in 2003 and has received grants from the DAAD (German Academic Exchange Service), the Alexander von Humboldt Foundation, and the Arts and Humanities Research Council. In 2013-14 she was a Member in the School of Historical Studies at the Institute for Advanced Study and was co-president of the Board of Trustees of the Association of Members of the Institute for Advanced Study. In 2017, she won a Ronald and Deborah Ratner Distinguished Teaching Award from Ohio State.

In January 2019, Alison Beach was a coauthor of the article "Medieval women's early involvement in manuscript production suggested by lapis lazuli identification in dental calculus", which appeared in Science Advances. The article demonstrated that a female religious in twelfth-century Germany was likely involved in luxury book production as an illuminator because she had lapis lazuli in her dental calculus. The article received extensive global press coverage.

She is married to the economist David A. Jaeger.

== Books ==
- Women as Scribes: Book Production and Monastic Reform in Twelfth-Century Bavaria, Cambridge University Press, 2004.
- (ed.) Manuscripts and Monastic Culture: Reform and Renewal in Twelfth-Century Germany, Brepols, 2007
- (ed., with Lisa Bitel and Constance Hoffman Berman) Sacred Communities, Shared Devotions: Gender, Medieval Culture, and Monasticism in Late Medieval Germany, written by June Mecham, Brepols, 2014.
- Trauma of Monastic Reform: Community and Conflict in Twelfth-Century Germany, Cambridge University Press, 2017.
- (ed., with Isabelle Cochelin) Cambridge History of Medieval Monasticism in the Latin West, 2 vols., Cambridge, 2020.
