= 1926 North Dakota Agricultural Bison football team =

American college football season

1926 North Dakota Agricultural Bison football
- Conference: North Central Conference
- Record: 5–3 (2–3 NCC)
- Head coach: Ion Cortright (2nd season)
- Captain: Claudie Miller
- Home stadium: Dacotah Field

1926 North Central Conference football standings
	Conf.					Overall
Team	W		L		T	W		L		T
South Dakota State $	3	–	0	–	2	8	–	1	–	3
South Dakota	3	–	1	–	1	5	–	3	–	1
Morningside	2	–	1	–	0	6	–	2	–	0
Creighton	2	–	2	–	1	4	–	4	–	1
North Dakota	3	–	2	–	0	4	–	4	–	0
North Dakota Agricultural	2	–	3	–	0	5	–	3	–	0
Des Moines	1	–	4	–	0	2	–	7	–	0
Nebraska Wesleyan	0	–	3	–	0	6	–	4	–	0
$ – Conference champion

The 1926 North Dakota Agricultural Bison football team was an American football team that represented North Dakota Agricultural College (now known as North Dakota State University) in the North Central Conference (NCC) during the 1926 college football season. In its second season under head coach Ion Cortright, the team compiled a 5–3 record (2–3 against NCC opponents) and finished in sixth place out of eight teams in the NCC. The team played its home games at Dacotah Field in Fargo, North Dakota.

== Schedule ==
Date	Opponent	Site	Result	Attendance	Source
September 25	Valley City State*	Fargo, ND	W 20–0		
October 2	at Creighton	Creighton Stadium; Omaha, NE	L 13–26		
October 9	Des Moines	Dacotah Field; Fargo, ND	W 27–0		
October 16	at South Dakota State	Brookings, SD (rivalry)	L 0–21		
October 23	St. Thomas (MN)	Dacotah Field; Fargo, ND	W 27–6		
November 6	North Dakota	Dacotah Field; Fargo, ND (rivalry)	L 6–7	5,000	
November 13	Concordia (MN)*	Dacotah Field; Fargo, ND	W 20–0		
November 19	at Saint Mary's (MN)*	Winona, MN	W 6–0		
*Non-conference game
