= Committee on International Relations =

Graduate program at the University of Chicago

- Type: Private
- Established: 1928
- Location: Chicago, Illinois, U.S.
- Campus: Urban
- Website: cir.uchicago.edu

The Committee on International Relations (CIR) is a Master of Arts graduate degree program in international relations at the Social Sciences Division at the University of Chicago. Founded in 1928, it is the oldest international relations graduate program in the United States.

== History ==
The Committee on International Relations was founded in 1928 by a group of University of Chicago professors, including Hans Morgenthau and Quincy Wright. While CIR is known worldwide for one of the most distinguished programs in the study of international security, CIR faculty and students are also well known for academic work in international political economy, international institutions, globalization, international law, human rights, comparative politics, development and regional studies.

== The program ==
The combination of intellectual diversity and analytical strength provide a stimulating environment for CIR students. The small size and intellectual rigor of the program ensure that students with differing perspectives will challenge each other and come to a more sophisticated understanding of the complicated interaction between the realities of international politics and international economics. The program provides excellent preparation for students, whether they choose to continue their graduate studies in leading PhD programs, or decide to work in government or the private sector.

Each CIR graduate student is assigned a preceptor based on their own disciplinary and research interests in international relations, such as war, regional studies, or international economics.

=== Coursework ===
Students take three credited courses per quarter, which constitutes a full-load at the University of Chicago. Of the nine total courses, two are required "Core" classes, including a course on international security and another on international political economy. CIR students also take three mandatory non-credit classes, including two MA thesis workshops in the Fall and Winter quarters and a class taught by the CIR preceptors called "Perspectives on International Relations" in the Fall quarter. With the remaining seven credited courses, students are allowed to take any graduate-level course, with the following three restrictions: (1) seven of the nine courses must be on the CIR-approved course list, (2) at least three courses must be within the Division of Social Sciences, and (3) three courses must be taken in two of the four possible fields of study.

==== Fields of study ====
- International Security, Conflict Studies, and Contentious Politics
- International Political Economy and Development
- Comparative Studies in Political Institutions and Identity
- Human Rights, Environment, and International Law
- Research Methods in the Social Sciences

=== MA thesis ===
CIR students must also complete a thesis under the guidance of their preceptor and a faculty adviser of their choosing. Students will be aided by the two required MA thesis workshop classes in the Fall and Winter quarters. Each thesis is expected to be between 35–45 pages in length and below 14,000 words.

=== MA with specialization ===
CIR students who wish to pursue a particular research topic in greater depth than is possible in one year may pursue the second-year specialization program. Specialization is best designed for students who plan to continue with graduate studies in a Ph.D. program at the University of Chicago or elsewhere. Specialization is competitive; on average 10–12 students apply, and 2–4 are accepted.

== Joint degrees ==
CIR offers joint degrees with different programs and schools at the University of Chicago.

- BA/MA – offered only to current University of Chicago undergraduates entering their senior year
- MA/MA – with the Harris School of Public Policy Studies
- MBA/MA – with the University of Chicago Graduate School of Business
- JD/MA – with the University of Chicago Law School

== Notable faculty ==
- Bruce Cumings
- John Mearsheimer
- Robert Pape
- Eric Posner
- Bernard Wasserstein
- Charles Lipson
- Dali Yang
