= David A. Jaeger =

American economist

- Born: 1964 (age 61–62)
- Spouse: Alison Beach (m. 1990)
- Awards: W.E. Upjohn Institute Dissertation Award

Academic background
- Education: University of Michigan (Ph.D.); University of Michigan (M.A.); Williams College (B.A.)
- Doctoral advisor: John Bound

Academic work
- Discipline: Economics
- Sub-discipline: Labor economics, Econometrics, Conflict economics
- Institutions: University of St Andrews, CUNY Graduate Center, University of Cologne, College of William and Mary, Hunter College
- Website: http://www.djaeger.org

David Allen Jaeger (born 1964) is a professor of economics at the University of St Andrews, a Research Fellow at IZA Institute of Labor Economics, and a Research Fellow at the Centre for Economic Policy Research. He was previously a professor of economics at the CUNY Graduate Center and a Research Fellow in the National Bureau of Economic Research. He is the author of numerous papers in labor economics, the economics of conflict, and econometrics, including a widely cited paper on the consequences of using weak instruments in instrumental variable estimation. He completed his B.A. in economics at Williams College in 1986 and his Ph.D. in economics at the University of Michigan in 1995. He also holds an M.A. in statistics from the University of Michigan. Since 2021 he is the Editor of the Scottish Journal of Political Economy. At St Andrews, he created and directs the Master of Public Policy program.

David Jaeger is married to the medieval historian Alison Beach.

== Honors ==
In 1995 he was the first winner of the W.E. Upjohn Institute Dissertation Award. In 2003-2004 he was the recipient of a fellowship from the Alexander von Humboldt Foundation. He was made a Fellow of the Royal Economic Society in May 2025. In 2026 he was elected President-Elect of the European Society for Population Economics and serves as President from 2026 to 2027.
