= Bownds =

Bownds is a surname. Notable people with the surname include:

- Greg Bownds (born 1977), Australian wrestler
- Rebel Wilson (born 1980 as Melanie Elizabeth Bownds), Australian actress

== See also ==
- Bounds (surname)
- Bound (surname)
- Bownd
