= Wallace Thompson =

American politician

Wallace Thompson (January 1, 1896 – January 22, 1952) was an American lawyer and politician.

Born in Galesburg, Illinois, Thompson received his bachelor's degree from Knox College. He then served in the United States Army during World War I. Thompson then received his law degree from Harvard Law School and then practiced law in Galesburg, Illinois. Thompson was the attorney for The Labor News and was a director of the Galesburg National Bank and Trust Company. He did farming as a hobby. Thompson was also the legal representative of the Galesburg School Board. Thompson served in the Illinois State Senate from 1943 until his death and was a Republican. He died of a heart attack in Chicago, Illinois after taking a steam bath at the Lincoln Hotel. He was in Chicago to discuss his candidacy for the Republican nomination for the office of Illinois Lieutenant Governor.
