= Philip Bounds =

British historian

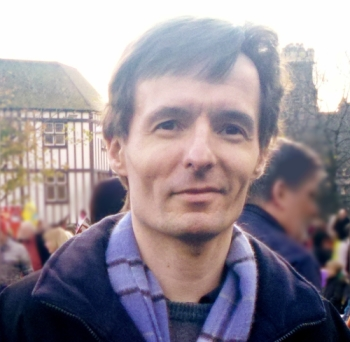
- Philip Bounds in 2011
- Born: Swansea, Wales, U.K.
- Died: 8 April 2020; Swansea, Wales, UK

Philip Bounds was a Marxist historian, journalist and critic. He held a PhD in Politics from the University of Wales and wrote a number of books, including Orwell and Marxism and British Communism and the Politics of Literature, 1928–1939.

== Work ==
Much of Bounds's work was concerned with the intellectual history of the British Left. His book on George Orwell advanced the controversial argument that Orwell's literary and cultural criticism was deeply influenced by the work of British communists. The book was praised for its originality by leading Orwell scholars such as Peter Davison, John Newsinger and Jean-Jacques Rosat.

Bounds's last book was a memoir of life on the British left entitled Notes from the End of History. Drawing on his own experience of organisations like the Socialist Party of Great Britain and the Communist Party of Britain, Bounds evokes the evolution of the Marxist left over the last thirty years in a style that is simultaneously affectionate and satirical. In her review of the book in the journal New Welsh Review, Helen Pendry described it as "a romp of a read...politically searching [and] gloriously well written". A review in the Socialist Standard described it as "exceptionally well written" and suggested that "Bounds wishes to challenge his readers to move beyond the stock-in-trade reformism and sloganeering of the far left".

Philip Bounds described himself as a "libertarian Marxist" and said that his "enduring belief is that individual liberty can only be achieved in a socialist society". In some of his writings he expressed cautious sympathy with free-market libertarians, and he wrote pamphlets for the Libertarian Alliance. He once claimed that "The great virtue of right-wing libertarians is that they stolidly defend freedom even in the hardest cases."

Bounds's work on the history of the left has been supplemented by shorter pieces on an eclectic range of subjects, including the music of Pete Townshend, film and the paranormal.

His articles, essays and reviews appeared in a range of journals and newspapers including Critique, Socialist History, Socialism and Democracy, Nature, Society and Thought, Cultural Logic, The Individual, Key Words and George Orwell Studies.

== Select bibliography ==
- Orwell and Marxism: The Political and Cultural Thinking of George Orwell, London: I.B. Tauris, 2009.
- British Communism and the Politics of Literature, London: Merlin Press, 2012.
- Notes from the End of History: A Memoir of the Left in Wales, London: Merlin Press, 2012.
- Cultural Studies, Plymouth: Studymates, 1999.
- Edited with Mala Jagmohan, Recharting Media Studies: Essays on Neglected Media Critics, Oxford: Peter Lang, 2008.
- Edited with David Berry, British Marxism and Cultural Studies: Essays on a Living Tradition, Abingdon: Routledge, 2016.
- A Spy in the House of Art: The Marxist Criticism of Anthony Blunt, Critique: Journal of Socialist Theory, Vol. 46 No. 2, 2018.
- The Marxist Outsider: T.A. Jackson as Autobiographer and Critic, Socialism and Democracy, Vol. 31, No. 2, 2017.
- The Necessity of Interpretation: Arnold Kettle and Communist Literary Criticism, Socialist History, No. 51, 2017.
- "Science, Art and Dissent: Jack Lindsay and the Communist Theory of Culture" in Philip Bounds and David Berry (eds), British Marxism and Cultural Studies, Abingdon: Routledge, 2016.
- "Sectarians on Wigan Pier: George Orwell and the Anti-Austerity Left in Britain" in Richard Lance Keeble (ed), George Orwell Now!, New York: Peter Lang, 2014.
- "Poetry versus Cinema: Meena Kumari as a Critic of Popular Culture" (with Daisy Hasan) in Noorul Hasan (ed), Meena Kumari the Poet: A Life Beyond Cinema, Delhi: Roli Books, 2014.
- "Just Say No: Herbert Marcuse and the Politics of Negationism" in David Berry (ed), Revisiting The Frankfurt School: Essays on Culture, Media and Theory, Farnham: Ashgate, 2012.
- "Learning from his Enemies: George Orwell and British Communism" in Richard Keeble (ed), Orwell Today, Bury St. Edmunds: Abramis, 2012.
- Remembering Communism: The Experience of Political Defeat, in Shuddha Sengupta et al. (eds), Sarai Reader 06: Turbulence, Delhi: Centre for the Study of Developing Societies, 2006.
- From Folk to Jazz: Eric Hobsbawm, British Communism and Cultural Studies, Critique: Journal of Socialist Theory, Vol. 40 No. 4, 2012.
- Orwell and Englishness: The Dialogue with British Marxism, Cultural Logic: An Electronic Journal of Marxist Theory and Practice, 2007.
- Beyond Ways of Seeing: The Media Criticism of John Berger, Fifth Estate Online: An International Journal of Radical Mass Media Criticism, May 2008.
- Unlikely Bedfellows: Orwell and the British Cultural Marxists, Nature, Society and Thought, Vol. 20 No. 1, 2007.
- The Case for Revolution [on Zizek], The Caravan: A Journal of Politics and Culture, May 2010.
- Exasperating but Necessary [on Ayn Rand], The Caravan: A Journal of Politics and Culture, November 2010.

== Selected discussions of Bounds's work ==
- Peter Davison, Review of Orwell and Marxism, American Communist History, Vol. 9 No. 3, 2010.
- Peter Arkell, Review of Orwell and Marxism, A World to Win, August 2010.
- Christopher Pawling, Review of British Communism and the Politics of Literature, Rethinking Marxism, Vol. 26 No. 4, 2014.
- Jack Farmer, Review of British Communism and the Politics of Literature 1928–1939, Socialist Review, April 2012.
- Lawrence Parker, Review of British Communism and the Politics of Literature 1928–1939, Weekly Worker, 926, August 2012.
- Andy Brooks, Review of British Communism and the Politics of Literature 1928–1939, New Worker, May 2012.
- "DAP", Review of Notes from the End of History, Socialist Standard, November 2014.
