= Anna Groff Bryant =

American singer

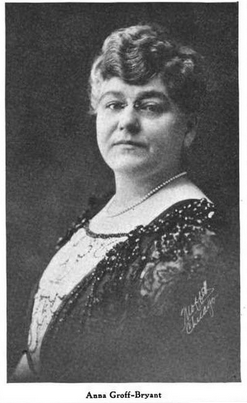
Anna Groff Bryant, from a 1915 publication

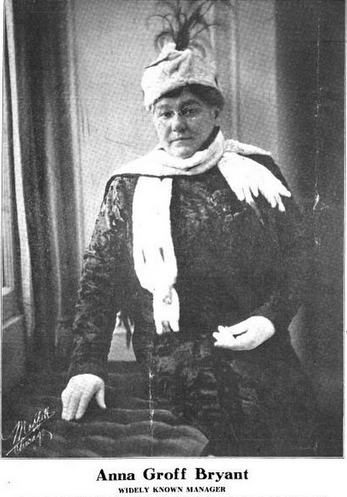
Anna Groff Bryant, from a 1917 publication

Anna Groff Bryant (1860 — January 27, 1941) was an American concert singer and voice educator.

== Early life ==
Anna Groff was born in Milwaukee, Wisconsin, the daughter of Michael Groff and Anna Kirch Groff. She studied music at Downer College and at Northwestern University.

== Career ==
Bryant opened her own school, the Anna Groff-Bryant Institute of Vocal Art, in Chicago in 1903. In 1912, she moved her program to Lombard College in Galesburg, Illinois, where she was given a custom-built studio for her work. She continued to hold a summer school for music teachers in Chicago. She was also musical director of the Galesburg Woman's Club. Many of her students were employed as church soloists in the Chicago area. She also taught voice in southern California.

She lectured and wrote articles about vocal education, including "Concerning the Musicianship of Singers" (1908), "The Compass of the Voice and the Singing Range" (1909), and "A Scientific Analysis of the Contralto Voice Instrument" (1909). She also published and edited a journal, The Institute, about vocal music and pedagogy, and organized a visiting artists' series in Galesburg.

== Personal life ==
Anna Groff married Chauncy Earle Bryant, a tenor and voice teacher, in 1897.

She died in 1941, aged 80, in Chicago.
