= Olav Reiersøl =

Norwegian mathematician

- Born: 28 June 1908
- Died: 14 February 2001 (aged 92)
- Education: University of Oslo (cand. real. 1935)
- Known for: Instrumental variables
- Scientific career
- Fields: Statistics; Econometrics
- Doctoral advisor: Ragnar Frisch; Harald Cramér

Olav Reiersøl (28 June 1908 – 14 February 2001) was a Norwegian statistician and econometrician, who made several substantial contributions to econometrics and statistics. His works on identifiability and instrumental variables are standard references both in econometrics and statistics, and his work on genetic algebras are frequently cited in genetics.

Reiersøl became interested in the international language Esperanto at a young age, and later in life used it to keep in touch with other mathematicians. He was one of the founders of the Esperanto association Internacia Asocio de Esperantistaj Matematikistoj ("International Association of Esperantist Mathematicians").

He was made a fellow of the Econometric Society in 1952.
