= William Bownd =

Welsh Arminian Baptist (fl. 1658)

William Bownd (fl. 1658) was a Welsh Arminian Baptist minister. He lived in Montgomeryshire but worshipped with Arminian Baptists in Radnorshire. It is unknown whether he received a stipend for his ministry after 1658.

Together with John Price of Maes-y-Gelli, Nantmel parish, Radnorshire, he published the book, The Sun Outshining the Moon (London, 1658).

The date of his death is unknown.
