= Quincy Wright =

American political scientist (1890–1970)

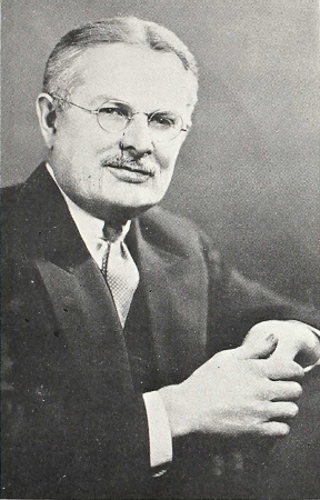
- Wright c. 1940
- Born: December 28, 1890; Medford, Massachusetts, United States
- Died: October 17, 1970 (aged 79); Charlottesville, Virginia, United States
- Occupations: Professor, Political scientist
- Writing career
- Genres: War, International law

Philip Quincy Wright (December 28, 1890 – October 17, 1970) was an American political scientist based at the University of Chicago known for his pioneering work and expertise in international law, international relations, and security studies. He headed the Causes of War project at the University of Chicago, which resulted in the prominent 1942 multi-volume book A Study of War.

== Biography ==
Born in Medford, Massachusetts, Wright received his B.A. from Lombard College in 1912. He completed his Ph.D. at the University of Illinois in 1915. He also received an LL.D. He taught at Harvard University and the University of Minnesota before joining the department of social sciences at the University of Chicago in 1923. In 1927, he was elected a Fellow of the American Academy of Arts and Sciences. He was one of the co-founders of Chicago's Committee On International Relations in 1928, the first graduate program in international relations established in the United States. In addition to his academic work, Wright was an adviser to Justice Robert H. Jackson at the Nuremberg Trials, and often provided advice to the U.S. State Department. During World War II, Wright was a consultant in the U.S. State Department. In 1956 he became Professor of International Law in the Woodrow Wilson Department of Foreign Affairs at the University of Virginia. He retired in 1961 and became a visiting professor at numerous universities, both within the United States and abroad, including, Tsing Hua University in Beijing, the Graduate Institute of International Studies in Geneva, Mexico, Cuba, The Hague and Turkey.

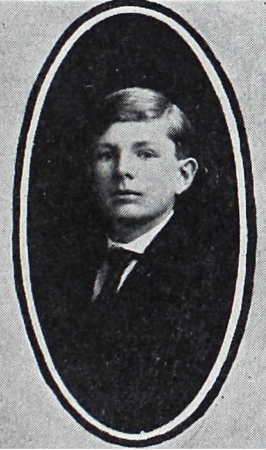
Quincy Wright in 1909

Throughout his career Wright served as president of several scholarly bodies, including the American Association of University Professors (1944–1946), the American Political Science Association (1948–1949), the International Political Science Association (1950–1952), and the American Society of International Law (1955–1956). He was elected to the American Philosophical Society in 1943. He was a member of the editorial board of the American Association of International Law from 1923 until his death. He was also active in the U.S. United Nations Association.

Wright's father was the economist Philip Green Wright and his brothers were the geneticist Sewall Wright and the aeronautical engineer Theodore Paul Wright.

== Academic work ==
During the 1920s, the horrors of World War I were foremost in the thoughts of many social scientists. Soon after his arrival at Chicago, Wright organized an ongoing interdisciplinary study of wars, which eventually resulted in over 40 dissertations and 10 books. Wright summarized this research in his magnum opus A Study of War (1942).

According to Karl Deutsch of Harvard University,

War, to be abolished, must be understood. To be understood, it must be studied. No one man worked with more sustained care, compassion, and level-headedness on the study of war, its causes, and its possible prevention than Quincy Wright. He did so for nearly half a century, not only as a defender of man's survival, but as a scientist. He valued accuracy, facts, and truth more than any more appealing or preferred conclusions; and in his great book, A Study of War, he gathered, together with his collaborators, a larger body of relevant facts, insights, and far-ranging questions about war than anyone else has done.

Wright's study of warfare inspired many social scientists and his database of wars is an indispensable resource for anyone seriously interested in quantitative studies of human conflicts.

Other than A Study of War, Wright published a further 20 books and nearly 400 journal articles during his career. Several of his books became standard texts, including Mandates Under the League of Nations (1930) and The Study of International Relations (1955). In The Study of International Relations, Wright distinguished between eight root disciplines of international relations: "international law, diplomatic history, military science, international politics, international organization, international trade, colonial government, and the conduct of foreign relations." These disciplines were supplemented by the following specialties: "world history, world geography, pacifism, the psychology and sociology of international relations; humanistic, social, and biological disciplines; and the recent development of regional studies, operational research, and group dynamics." In a review of the book, Harold Lasswell wrote that Wright sought to provide a common frame for the study of world politics and to halt an emerging trend towards increased specialization.

Wright was a prominent legal expert on the mandates system. While conducting research for Mandates Under the League of Nations (1930), which was funded by a Guggenheim Foundation grant, Wright visited Damascus less than two weeks after it had been shelled during the Great Syrian Revolt. His experiences in Damascus shaped his views on the mandates system and colonialism. Wright rebutted notions that Syrians were barbarians who could not govern themselves. He argued that the Syrian rebels were a state in the making and that French actions to repress the Syrians were a "policy of terrorism" and war crimes. Wright rebutted notions that Syrians were not protected by international law. Some of Wright's contemporaries, such as Elbridge Colby, criticized Wright, arguing that "savage tribes" were not protected by international humanitarian law.

== Selected publications ==
- The Control of American Foreign Relations. 1922. Macmillan.
- "The Palestine Problem", Political Science Quarterly, Vol. 41, No. 3 (September 1926), pp. 384–412, JSTOR 2142128
- Mandates Under the League of Nations. 1930. University of Chicago Press.
- Research in International Law Since the War. 1930. Carnegie Endowment for International Peace.
- Public Opinion and World Politics. 1933. University of Chicago Press.
- A Study of War. 1942. University of Chicago Press.
- The Study of International Relations. 1955. Appleton-Century-Crofts.
- The Strengthening of International Law. 1960. Academic of International Law.
- International Law and the United States. 1960. Asia Publishing House.
- The Role of International Law in the Elimination of War. 1961. Oceana.

== See also ==
- War cycles
