= John Bound =

American labor economist

Academic background
- Education: Harvard University
- Doctoral advisor: Zvi Griliches

Academic work
- Discipline: Labor economics
- Institutions: University of Michigan
- Doctoral students: David A. Jaeger; Patrick Kline; Sarah E. Turner

John Bound is an American labor economist who serves as George E. Johnson Collegiate Professor of Economics and Director of Doctoral Admissions in the College of Literature, Science, and the Arts at the University of Michigan. He is an elected fellow of the Econometric Society and the Society of Labor Economists.
