= Mae Shumway Enderly =

American clubwoman, harpist and entertainer

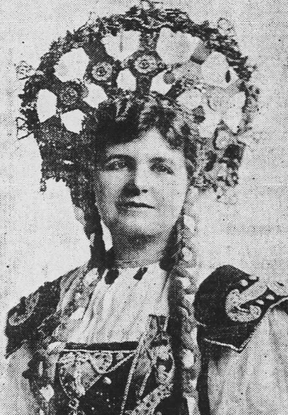
- Mae Shumway Enderly, dressed in a Norwegian bridal costume from a 1916 publication.
- Born: Minnie Mae Shumway; October 30, 1871; Galesburg, Illinois
- Died: After May 1943
- Occupations: harpist, entertainer
- Known for: lyceum circuit, Chautauquas, vaudeville

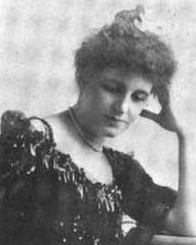
Mae Shumway Enderly (1909)

Mae Shumway Enderly (October 30, 1871 – after May 1943) was an American clubwoman, harpist and entertainer on the lyceum platform, the Chautauqua circuit, and the vaudeville stage.

== Early life ==
Minnie Mae Shumway was born in Galesburg, Illinois, the daughter of Stephen Burroughs Shumway and Lydia Jane Streeter Shumway. She pursued training for the stage at the Frohman School for Expression in New York.

== Career ==
Mae Shumway moved to Nebraska with her family as a young woman, and taught school there.

Mae Shumway Enderly's performances for the lyceum, Chautauqua, and vaudeville audiences involved various costumes, singing, impersonating historical and cultural figures or giving dramatic readings, sometimes while also playing a small Irish harp. "I have spent weeks searching in the public libraries of Los Angeles and other cities," she explained about her material, "I am continually searching the best magazines and periodicals for authentic news so that I may improve my programs."

Enderly was popular with American audiences. In 1909 she toured with soprano Gloria Mayne-Windsor, as the Enderly-Windsor Company. For several years (at least 1909-1914) she gave a costumed dramatic reading called "The Spanish Student". During World War I she developed a sketch called "Brides of Our Allies" or "Peasant Brides", in which she wore wedding gowns from various European cultures, and discussed those traditions while she sang and played the harp. She presented a "tragic playlet" called "Ballard of Despair" to Los Angeles club audiences in 1917. She sang Irish songs and played harp in costume at the Ebell Club in Los Angeles for St. Patrick's Day in 1919. She recited "The Rubaiyat of Omar Khayyam" while wearing a "Persian costume" at the harp, or poems by Edgar Guest, with harp accompaniment she wrote.

Enderly also played harp and gave her spoken presentations for radio audiences. As a prominent clubwoman, she was the official head hostess to Illinois attendees during the 1932 Summer Olympics in Los Angeles. In 1933 she was founder and president of the International Woman's Club of Los Angeles (formerly known as the Illinois-California Women's Breakfast Club).

== Personal life ==
Minnie Mae Shumway married lumber executive Frederick W. Enderly in Nebraska in 1892. They lived in southern California. They had two children, Richard Curtis Enderly (born 1895) and Venita Grace Enderly (1899-1901). Her son married dancer Pearl Eaton in 1931.
