= Patrick Kline =

Professor of Economics

Patrick McGraw Kline

Academic background
- Education: B.A. (1999), Reed College; M.P.P. (2001), Ph.D. (2007) University of Michigan

Academic work
- Institutions: University of California, Berkeley

Patrick McGraw Kline is an American economist and Professor of Economics of the University of California at Berkeley. In 2018, his research was awarded the Sherwin Rosen Prize by the Society of Labor Economists for "outstanding contributions in the field of labor economics". In 2020, he was awarded the prestigious IZA Young Labor Economist Award.

== Biography ==
Patrick Kline earned B.A. in political science from Reed College in 1999, followed by an MPP from the Ford School of Public Policy and a Ph.D. in economics from the University of Michigan at Ann Arbor in 2001 and 2007, respectively. During his Ph.D., Kline briefly worked as an assistant professor at Yale University (2007–08), after which he moved to the University of California at Berkeley, where he was promoted to associate professor in 2015 and full professor in 2018. Kline is affiliated with the National Bureau of Economic Research and the International Growth Centre. In terms of professional service, Kline performs editorial duties for the journals Econometrica, Journal of Political Economy, Review of Economic Studies, and American Economic Journal: Applied Economics.

== Research ==
Patrick Kline's research interests include labor economics, urban economics and econometrics. According to IDEAS/RePEc, Kline belongs to the top 2% of economists in terms of research output. Key results of his research include the following:

- Finding intergenerational economic mobility to vary substantially across the United States, Kline, Emmanuel Saez, Raj Chetty and Nathaniel Hendren identify (i) residential segregation, (ii) income inequality, (iii) low primary school quality, (iv) low social capital, and (v) low family stability as key characteristics of areas with low mobility. Overall, while they conclude that mobility has remained stable over time, they highlight that some areas in the U.S. have persistently offered less mobility than most other developed countries.
- Kline, David Card and Jörg Heining argue that the rise in West German wage inequality is due to a combination of growing differences between workers, stronger dispersion between the wage premia paid by different firms, and an increased tendency of high-ability workers to sort into high-premium paying establishments. In further work on wage inequality with Card and Ana Rute Cardoso, Kline finds evidence that gender differences in terms of workplace bargaining and sorting – e.g. men sorting themselves into firms with higher wage premia and women earning smaller wage premia than men within the same firm – account for about 20% of the gender wage gap in Portugal. Along with Heining, they further argue that firm-level drivers of wage inequality can be explained through workers' individual tastes for different workplaces.
- Evaluating a programme of U.S. empowerment zones (EZ), Kline, Matias Busso and Jesse Gregory find that EZ designation substantially raised employment and real wages in zone neighborhoods at modest efficiency costs. In another example of a local economic development programme, together with Enrico Moretti, Kline studies the impact of the Tennessee Valley Authority (TVA); they find that the programme helped foster infrastructure improvements that yielded long-growing gains in manufacturing employment and raised U.S. manufacturing productivity though local agglomeration gains seem to cancel out with losses in the rest of the U.S. Overall, Kline and Moretti have argued that "place-based policies have the potential to profoundly affect the location of economic activity, along with the wages, employment, and industry mix of communities".

== Honours and awards ==
- W.E. Upjohn Institute for Employment Research: Dissertation Award (2007)
- American Economic Review: Excellence in Refereeing Award (2015/16/17)
- Society of Labor Economists: Sherwin Rosen Prize (2018)
