= Theodore Paul Wright =

American aeronautical engineer and inventor of Wright's law of productivity gains

- Born: May 25, 1895; Galesburg, Illinois
- Died: August 21, 1970 (aged 75)
- Education: Lombard College; Massachusetts Institute of Technology
- Engineering career
- Discipline: Aeronautical engineering
- Institutions: Civil Aeronautics Administration, Cornell University
- Employers: Curtiss Aeroplane & Motor Company,

Theodore Paul Wright (May 25, 1895 – August 21, 1970), also known as T. P. Wright, was a U.S. aeronautical engineer and educator.

== Biography ==
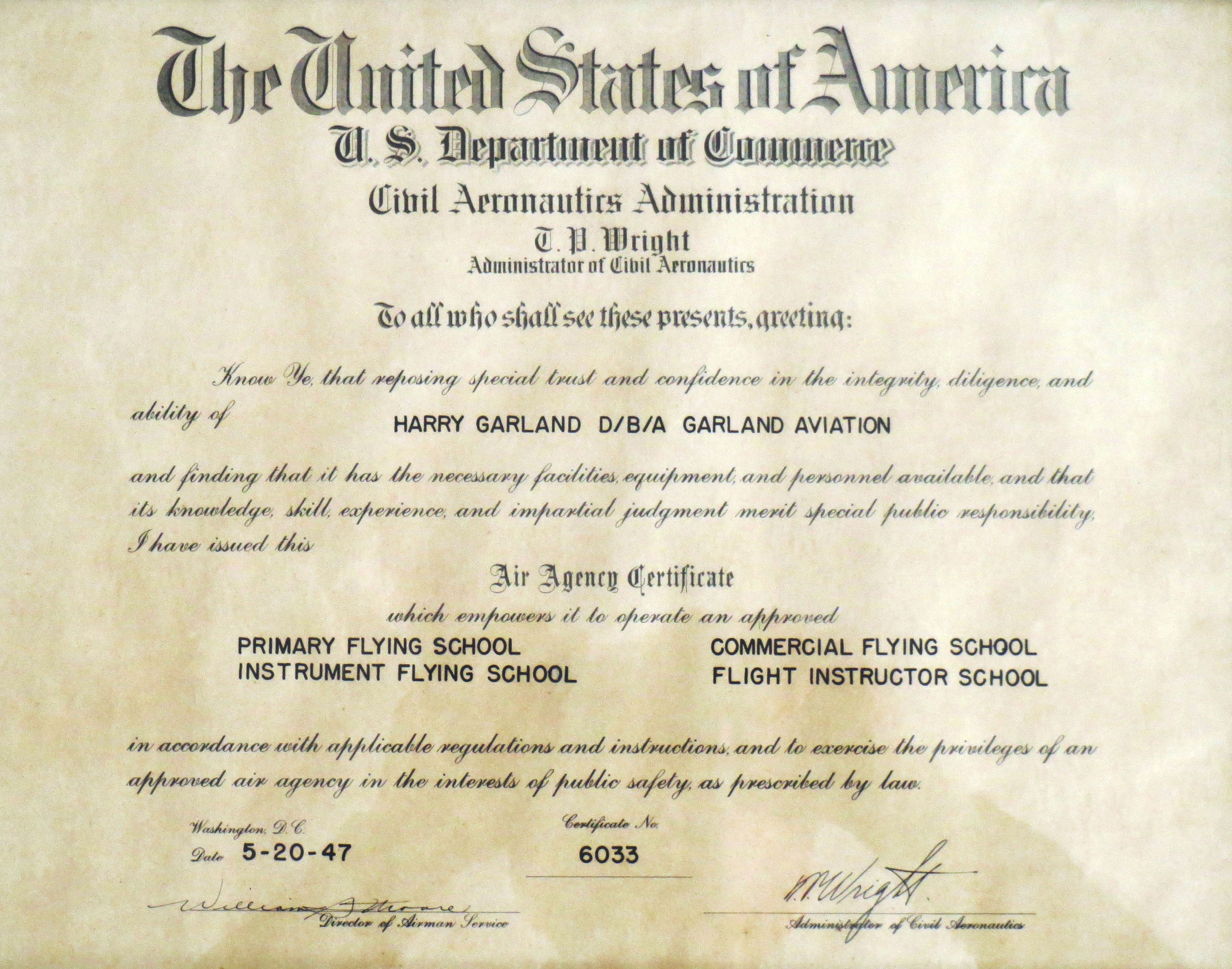
Air Agency Certificate issued by T. P. Wright, Administrator of Civil Aeronautics, to Harry Garland dba Garland Aviation in 1947

He was born in Galesburg, Illinois on May 25, 1895. His father was the economist Philip Green Wright and his brothers were the geneticist Sewall Wright and the political scientist Quincy Wright. He graduated from Lombard College and Massachusetts Institute of Technology. He served in World War I.

In 1936, he published an important paper entitled "Factors affecting the costs of airplanes" which describes what is known as Wright's law or experience curve effects. The paper describes that "we learn by doing" and that the cost of each unit produced decreases as a function of the cumulative number of units produced.

He served as administrator of the Civil Aeronautics Administration during 1944–1948. When President Truman announced Wright’s resignation as Administrator of Civil Aeronautics on January 16, 1948, The New York Times reported that Wright felt he could not continue in office at a salary of $10,000 per year (equivalent to $130,000 in 2025).

He served as Cornell University's vice president in charge of research from 1948 to 1960 and served as acting president of Cornell University in 1951. He died on August 21, 1970.

== Awards ==
- Wright Brothers Medal (1930)
- Honorary Doctorate from Knox College (1937)
- Daniel Guggenheim Medal (1945)

== See also ==
- Learning curve
- Experience curve effects
