= Lombard College =

Universalist college in Galesburg, Illinois (1853–1930)

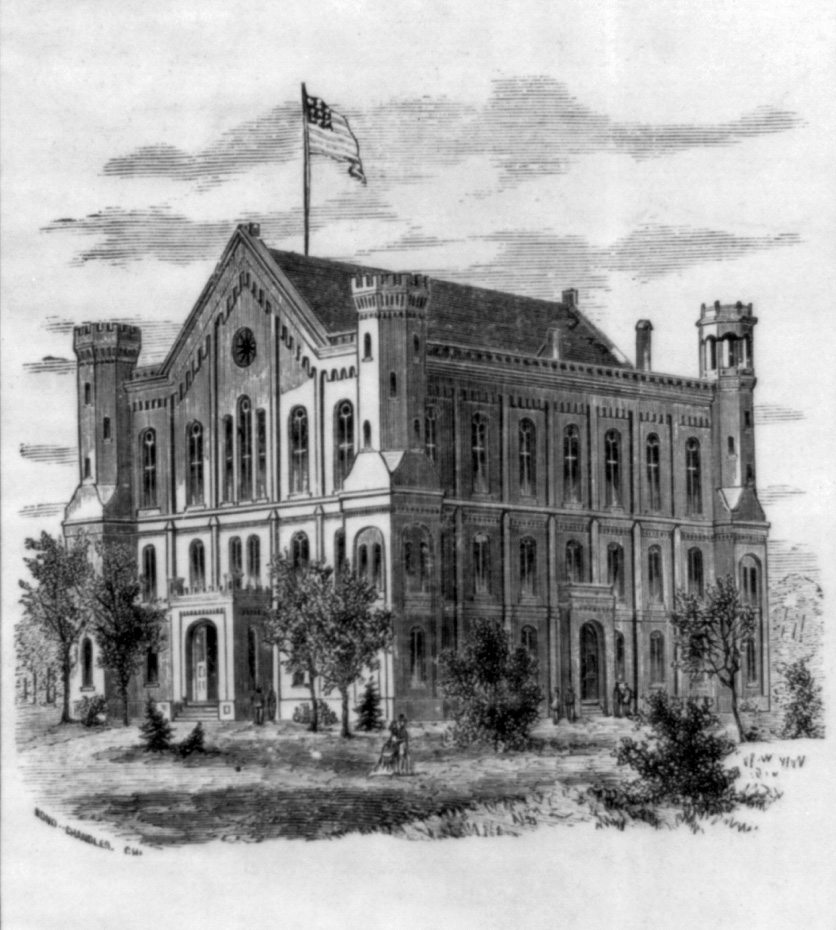
Lombard College building, from an 1876 catalog

Lombard College was a Universalist college located in Galesburg, Illinois.

== History ==
Lombard College was founded in 1853 by the Universalist Church as the Illinois Liberal Institute. In 1855, however, a major fire damaged much of the college, placing its future at risk, but a large gift from Benjamin Lombard (1815–1882), a Massachusetts-born farmer and businessman, rescued the institution, rechristened as Lombard University. The official name of the school was changed to Lombard College.

Lombard was coeducational from its founding, reflecting the Universalist philosophy. The institution was the seat of the Ryder School of Divinity from sometime in the 1880s until 1913. The very first chapter of the national sorority Alpha Xi Delta was also founded there in 1893.

Lombard College was a member of the Illinois Intercollegiate Athletic Conference from 1910 to 1929.

The Great Depression proved to be too much for Lombard; the last class was graduated in 1930. While Lombard did not merge, some of its students transferred to nearby Knox College, and its alumni activities take place at Knox. Sigma Nu fraternity's Delta Theta chapter, which formed at Lombard in 1867 as the Delta Theta Society (local) and became a part of Sigma Nu in 1891, continues its activities at Knox to this day. Until 1973, the Alpha chapter of Alpha Xi Delta also continued at Knox.

The former Lombard College building and campus is currently used as Lombard Middle School.

When the college closed in 1930, the Lombard charter was transferred to Meadville Theological School in Chicago, a Unitarian seminary, bringing with it Lombard's privilege of a tax exemption, "one of only three in Illinois granting full tax-exempt status in perpetuity for all college-owned property." In 1964 the school adopted the name "Meadville Theological School of Lombard College". The combined institution later became Meadville Lombard Theological School.

== Notable alumni ==
- Ken Carpenter - radio-TV announcer
- Edwin H. Conger – U.S. Congressman, diplomat, and Minister to Brazil, China, and Mexico
- Jennie Florella Holmes — American temperance activist and suffragist
- Effie McCollum Jones - Universalist minister, suffragist
- William Bramwell Powell - educator, co-founder of National Geographic Society
- Carl Sandburg (non-graduate) – author, poet, Pulitzer Prize winner
- Paul Jordan Smith – editor, educator, poet
- Lon Stiner (non-graduate) - college football coach
- Evar Swanson – professional baseball and football player
- Vespasian Warner – politician, lawyer, businessman.
- Owen B. West - Illinois state legislator, farmer, and businessman
- Sewall G. Wright – geneticist
- Quincy Wright – educator, poet, economist
- Theodore Paul Wright – engineer, first director of the Civil Aeronautics Administration

== Notable faculty ==
- Anna Groff Bryant — vocal teacher, head of music department
- Philip Green Wright
- David Starr Jordan – ichthyologist, president of Indiana University; founding president of Stanford University
- Wilhelmine Key - geneticist, eugenics
