= 1928 Big Ten Conference football season =

- Sport: Football
- Number of teams: 10
- Champion: Illinois
- Runners-up: Wisconsin
- Season MVP: Chuck Bennett

Football seasons
- ← 1927 1929 →

1928 Big Ten Conference football standings
	Conf.					Overall
Team	W		L		T	W		L		T
No. 6 Illinois $	4	–	1	–	0	7	–	1	–	0
No. 4 Wisconsin	3	–	1	–	1	7	–	1	–	1
Minnesota	4	–	2	–	0	6	–	2	–	0
No. 6 Iowa	3	–	2	–	0	6	–	2	–	0
Ohio State	3	–	2	–	0	5	–	2	–	1
Purdue	2	–	2	–	1	5	–	2	–	1
Northwestern	2	–	3	–	0	5	–	3	–	0
Michigan	2	–	3	–	0	3	–	4	–	1
Indiana	2	–	4	–	0	4	–	4	–	0
Chicago	0	–	5	–	0	2	–	7	–	0
$ – Conference champion; Rankings from Dickinson System

The 1928 Big Ten Conference football season was the 33rd season of college football played by the member schools of the Big Ten Conference (also known as the Western Conference) and was a part of the 1928 college football season.

The 1928 Illinois Fighting Illini football team, under head coach Robert Zuppke, compiled a 7–1 record, won the Big Ten championship, led the conference in scoring defense (2.0 points allowed per game), and was ranked No. 7 in the Dickinson System rankings. Tackles Albert J. Nowack and Russell Crane and guard Leroy Wietz were selected as first-team All-Americans.

The 1928 Wisconsin Badgers football team, under head coach Glenn Thistlethwaite, compiled a 7–1–1 record and was ranked No. 4 in the Dickinson System rankings. Guard Rube Wagner was selected as a first-team All-Big Ten player.

The 1928 Minnesota Golden Gophers football team, under head coach Clarence Spears, compiled a 6–2 record, finished third in the Big Ten, and led the conference in scoring offense (23.9 points per game). Guard George Gibson and end Ken Haycraft were named All-Americans by the Associated Press and Look Magazine. Gibson, Haycraft and quarterback Frederick L. Hovde received first-team All-Big Ten honors.

The 1928 Iowa Hawkeyes football team, under head coach Burt Ingwersen, compiled a 6–2 record and was ranked No. 6 in the Dickinson System rankings. Halfback Willis Glassgow received first-team All-Big Ten honors.

Indiana halfback Chuck Bennett received the Chicago Tribune Silver Football trophy as the most valuable player in the conference. Northwestern's triple threat star Walt Holmer finished second in close voting for the trophy; Bennett received eight of 22 first place votes, and Holmer received seven.

== Season overview ==
=== Results and team statistics ===
Conf. Rank	Team	Head coach	Overall record	Conf. record	DS rank	PPG	PAG	MVP
1	Illinois	Robert Zuppke	7–1	4–1	#7	18.1	2.0	Douglas R. Mills
2	Wisconsin	Glenn Thistlethwaite	7–1–1	3–1–1	#4	18.1	4.2	Francis "Bo" Cuisiner
3	Minnesota	Clarence Spears	6–2	4–2	NR	23.9	4.5	Fred Holvde, Bronko Nagurski
4 (tie)	Iowa	Burt Ingwersen	6–2	3–2	#6	18.4	5.3	Willis Glassgow
4 (tie)	Ohio State	John Wilce	5–2–1	3–2	NR	16.9	4.4	Alan M. Holman
6	Purdue	Jimmy Phelan	5–2–1	2–2–1	NR	17.9	5.1	Ralph Welch
7 (tie)	Northwestern	Dick Hanley	5–3	2–3	NR	8.1	5.4	Walt Holmer
7 (tie)	Michigan	Tad Wieman	3–4–1	2–3	NR	4.5	7.8	Otto Pommerening
9	Indiana	Harlan Page	4–4	2–4	NR	6.9	8.5	Chuck Bennett
10	Chicago	Amos Alonzo Stagg	2–7	0–5	NR	7.8	19.7	

Key
DS = Rankings from Dickinson System. See 1928 college football season
PPG = Average of points scored per game
PAG = Average of points allowed per game
MVP = Most valuable player as voted by players on each team as part of the voting process to determine the winner of the Chicago Tribune Silver Football trophy

=== Bowl games ===
No Big Ten teams participated in any bowl games during the 1928 season.

== All-Big Ten players ==
The following players were picked by the Associated Press (AP), the United Press (UP), and/or Walter Eckersall (WE) as first-team players on the 1928 All-Big Ten Conference football team.

Position	Name	Team	Selectors
Quarterback	Frederick L. Hovde	Minnesota	AP, UP, WE
Halfback	Chuck Bennett	Indiana	AP, UP, WE
Halfback	Willis Glassgow	Iowa	AP, UP
Halfback	Ralph Welch	Purdue	WE
Fullback	Walt Holmer	Northwestern	AP, UP, WE
End	Wes Fesler	Ohio State	AP, UP, WE
End	Ken Haycraft	Minnesota	AP, UP, WE
Tackle	Otto Pommerening	Michigan	AP, UP, WE [guard]
Tackle	Albert J. Nowack	Illinois	AP, UP, WE
Guard	Rube Wagner	Wisconsin	AP, UP, WE [tackle]
Guard	George Gibson	Minnesota	AP, UP, WE
Center	Clare Randolph	Indiana	AP, UP
Center	Richard Brown	Iowa	WE

== All-Americans ==
Two Big Ten players were selected as consensus first-team players on the 1928 College Football All-America Team. They were:

Position	Name	Team	Selectors
End	Wes Fesler	Ohio State	AAB, CO, INS, NEA, UP
Tackle	Otto Pommerening	Michigan	AP, CO, INS, UP

Other Big Ten players received first-team honors from at least one selector. They were:

Position	Name	Team	Selectors
End	Ken Haycraft	Minnesota	CO, NANA
Tackle	Albert J. Nowack	Illinois	WCFF, AAB, NANA
Tackle	Russell Crane	Illinois	CP
Guard	George Gibson	Minnesota	UP, WCFF, AAB
Guard	Leroy Wietz	Illinois	NANA
