= Willis Glassgow =

American football player and attorney (1907–1959)

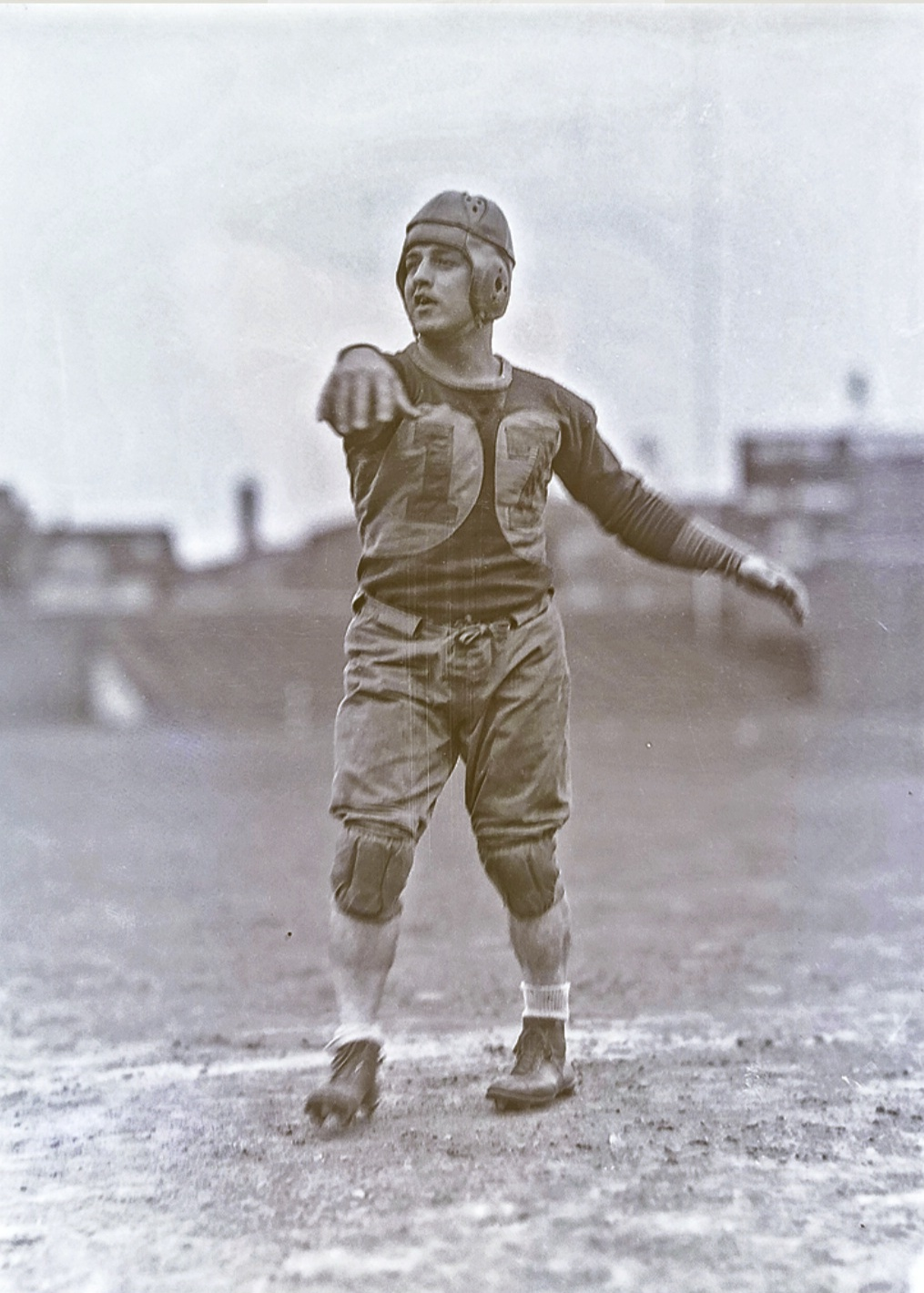

Profile
- Position: Halfback

Personal information
- Born: April 21, 1907; Wheeling, Missouri, U.S.
- Died: November 1, 1959 (aged 52); Cedar Rapids, Iowa, U.S.

Career information
- College: University of Iowa

Career history
- 1927–1929: Iowa Hawkeyes
- 1930: Portsmouth Spartans
- 1931: Chicago Cardinals

Awards and highlights
- First-team All-American (1929); Third-team All-American (1928); Chicago Tribune Silver Football (1929); 2× First-team All-Big Ten (1928, 1929)

Willis Allen "Bill" Glassgow (April 21, 1907 – November 1, 1959) graduated from Shenandoah Iowa high school. Willis was an American football player and attorney. He played halfback for the University of Iowa from 1927 to 1929, was selected as a first-team All-American in 1929, and received the 1929 Chicago Tribune Silver Football as the best football player in the Big Ten Conference. He played two seasons of professional football in the National Football League for the Portsmouth Spartans in 1930 and the Chicago Cardinals in 1931. He practiced law in Iowa from 1933 to 1959, including two terms as the Page County Attorney (1935–1939) and three terms as the Linn County Attorney (1951–1957).

== Biography ==
=== Early life ===
Glassgow was born in Wheeling, Missouri, in 1907. He was the son of Franklin and Nellie (Williams) Glassgow and lived on a farm west of Wheeling for the first ten years of his life. He moved with his family to Shenandoah, Iowa, in 1916 and attended Shenandoah High School where he was selected as Iowa's all-state quarterback as a sophomore in 1922. He was the captain of Shenandoah's 1923 football team.

=== College athlete ===
==== Nebraska ====
Glassgow enrolled at the University of Nebraska in 1925. As a freshman at Nebraska, Glassgow saw that the Cornhuskers were emphasizing "beef and brawn" over "speed and agility." At 5 feet, 8 inches, and 175 pounds, Glassgow concluded he would see more playing time elsewhere and transferred to the University of Iowa.

==== Iowa ====
After sitting out the 1926 season following his transfer, Glassgow played three years each for Iowa's football and baseball teams. As a baseball player, he played shortstop and won three varsity letters. He was the starting shortstop and leading hitter of the 1927 Iowa baseball team that tied for the Big Ten Conference championship. He gained his greatest acclaim playing at the halfback position for Iowa's football team from 1927 to 1929. Glassgow was the football team's leading ground gainer three straight years, a record that has not been equaled. In addition to his talent as a runner, Glassgow was also known as "a deadly tackler while operating at safety in the old diamond defense." He also handled punting and place kicking responsibilities for the Hawkeyes. Iowa coach Burt Ingwersen later said of Glassgow:

I think Bill's greatest attribute as a ball carrier was the fact that you could never run him out of bounds. When tacklers would corner him against the sidelines, he'd cut back, put his head down and let them have it. I'll never forget one game at Minnesota. He ran into a tackler so hard the poor Minnesota fellow got up and lined up in our backfield on the next play.

===== 1927 =====
As a sophomore in 1927, Glassgow ran for three touchdowns and kicked two extra points in the second quarter of his first football game for the Hawkeyes, a 32–6 win over Monmouth College. His 20-point total in the second quarter against Monmouth remains an Iowa Hawkeyes record for scoring in a single quarter.

===== 1928 =====
As a junior in 1928, Glassgow helped lead Iowa to six straight victories, including a 14–7 win over Ohio State in which Glassgow ran for 153 yards. The 1928 team lost the Big Ten Conference championship after a 10–7 loss to Michigan, a game in which Iowa's only touchdown came on a 55-yard run by Glasgow. Glassgow also gained acclaim in 1928 for his punting performance in Iowa's 7–6 win over a Minnesota team featuring Bronko Nagurski. Glassgow's punting helped keep Minnesota from scoring in the first three quarters. In the fourth quarter, a long punt by Glassgow sailed high over the head of Minnesota's Fred Hovde, but Hovde ran back to the nine-yard line where he retrieved the punt and ran for a 91-yard touchdown. Glassgow was injured trying to catch Hovde. At the end of the 1928 season, Glassgow was selected as a first-team All-Big Ten and All-Western player. He placed fourth in the voting for the Chicago Tribune Silver Football trophy as the most valuable player in the Big Ten Conference in 1928 and was elected by his teammates as the captain of the 1929 Iowa Hawkeyes football team. In reporting on his election as Iowa's 1929 captain, one Iowa newspaper described his as the team's "Dancing Master": "Glassgow is commonly known as Iowa's Dancing master because of his shiftiness on the gridiron and because he is manager of the most popular ball room in Iowa City." At the end of the 1928 season, The Des Moines Register wrote:

The new leader is something more than a triple threat man. His off-tackle dashes and ability in an open field are supplemented by his accomplishments as a place kicker, punter, and forward passer. Weighing only 160 pounds, Glassgow's 5 feet 9 inches of height ranked him as one of the shortest men on the squad. He was apparently immune to injury, and despite the fact that he was the target of every defense the Hawkeyes encountered, he almost never called for time out.

===== 1929 =====
As a senior in 1929, Glassgow gained further acclaim as the captain of a football team that permitted its opponents to score only 28 points all season. Despite the low-scoring by opponents, the Hawkeyes finished with a record of 4–2–2. On October 5, 1929, Glassgow scored the first touchdown in Iowa's new football stadium, now known as Kinnick Stadium, on a 31-yard run. He also scored the first touchdown in the official dedication game against the University of Illinois. In the Illinois game, Glassgow ran for a 78-yard touchdown on the first play from scrimmage. The touchdown was Iowa's only score in a 7–7 tie game against Illinois. Glassgow wore a protective face mask in the 1929 Illinois game (pictured above) to protect a broken cheek bone suffered in an earlier game. Glassgow also kicked a game-winning field goal in Iowa's 9–7 win over Minnesota on November 9, 1929.

The Iowa football program became embroiled in scandal late in the 1929 season. After an investigation revealed a slush fund used to pay football players, Iowa was banned from the Big Ten Conference. Following a 7–0 loss to Purdue, sports writer Irving Vaughn praised Glassgow in the Chicago Tribune:

If Iowa needs any consolation for its failure to create more havoc in the Big Ten circle from which it is to be banished, it can find it quite easily. Hawkeyes have Capt. Bill Glassgow. No halfback ever revealed himself in a brighter light. He ran off the tackles, he ripped into the line and he passed. He literally carried almost the entire Purdue team with him at times. When tougher and more willing backs are built, they will have to make the model from the stocky lad from Shenandoah, Iowa.

At the conclusion of the 1929 college football season, Glassgow was selected as a first-team All-American by Grantland Rice for Collier's Weekly, the Newspaper Editors Association (based on a poll of 100 coaches and football writers), The New York Sun, and sports writer Lawrence Perry. He was also named the outstanding back in the country by The New York Sun and received the Chicago Tribune Silver Football trophy as the most valuable player in the Big Ten Conference. Glassgow was also honored by being selected to play for the East team in the 1930 East-West Shrine Game. He scored one of the East's touchdowns in a 19–7 win but also suffered a shoulder injury in the Shrine Game that hampered his professional baseball career.

In four years of football at Iowa, Glassgow was credited with running for 1,424 yards on 364 attempts for an average of four yards per attempt. He scored a total of 80 points for the Hawkeyes on 10 touchdowns 17 extra points, and one field goal. He successfully converted 17 out of 22 extra point kicks.

At the end of 1929, officials of the University of Iowa athletic department selected Glassgow as one of the 12 greatest Iowa athletes of all time in all sports. Glassgow graduated from Iowa with a bachelor of arts degree in 1930.

=== Professional athlete ===
In January 1930, Branch Rickey signed Glassgow to a contract to play professional baseball for the St. Louis Cardinals. Glassgow attended spring training with the Cardinals but was released to the minor leagues at the end of March 1929. He played in 1930 for the Cardinals' Western League club in St. Joseph, Missouri and also for the team in Moline, Illinois. He was a teammate of Dizzy Dean at St. Joseph in 1930.

In the fall of 1930, Glassgow played professional football in the National Football League for the Portsmouth Spartans from Portsmouth, Ohio- later to become the Detroit Lions. He started all 12 games for the 1930 Spartans. He also played professional football in 1931 for the Chicago Cardinals- later to become St. Louis and then Arizona Cardinals.

=== Legal career ===
Glassgow attended law school at the University of Iowa College of Law while playing professional football, using the money he earned in the NFL to pay for his legal education. During the 1932 college football season, Glassgow was asked to serve as an assistant coach at Iowa under head coach Ossie Solem. Glassgow was in his final year of law school at the time and sought the extra remuneration to pay his expenses. However, the Big Ten at the time had a rule that prevented players who had played professional football from obtaining coaching positions at Big Ten schools. Glassgow applied to the conference for reinstatement of his amateur status, but the application was denied.

Glassgow received his law degree in 1933 and began practicing law in Shenandoah, Iowa. He was elected as the Page County Attorney in November 1934 and served two terms in the office from 1935 to 1939. In 1939, Glassgow moved his law practice to Cedar Rapids, Iowa. He was thrice elected as a Republican to the position of Linn County Attorney in 1950, 1952 and 1954.

In 1957, Glassgow left the county attorney's office to enter into private practice. He returned to the county attorney's office in February 1959 as Assistant Linn County Attorney.

=== Death and family ===
Glassgow married Hansetta McHugh in August 1931 at Princeton, Illinois. He died of leukemia in November 1959 at age 52. He was survived by his wife, Hansetta, two children, Willis Glassgow, Jr., and Nancy Glassgow Cooper. He was a member of St. John's Episcopal Church in Cedar Rapids, Iowa, the Elks Club, the Cedar Rapids Country Club, the Tri-Centum Lodge of the Antient Free and Accepted Masons, the Iowa Consistory, the El Kahir Shrine, the Pickwick Club and the American, Iowa and Linn County Bar Associations.

=== Posthumous honors ===
In 1973, Glassgow was inducted into The Des Moines Register's Iowa Sports Hall of Fame. In 1989, he became one of the charter members inducted into the University of Iowa Lettermen's Club Hall of Fame.

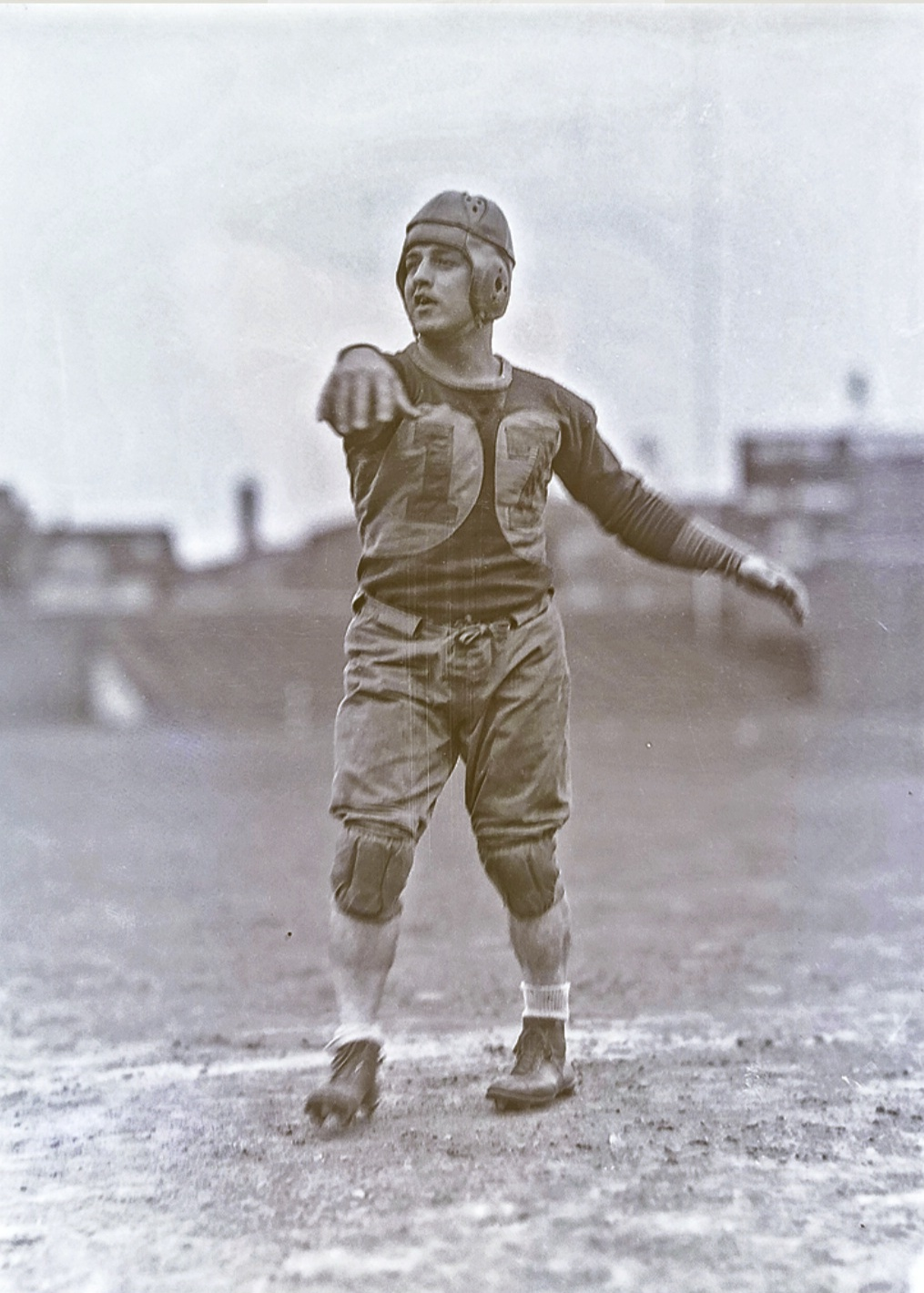
Willis Glassgow throwing a pass mid game, Circa 1930

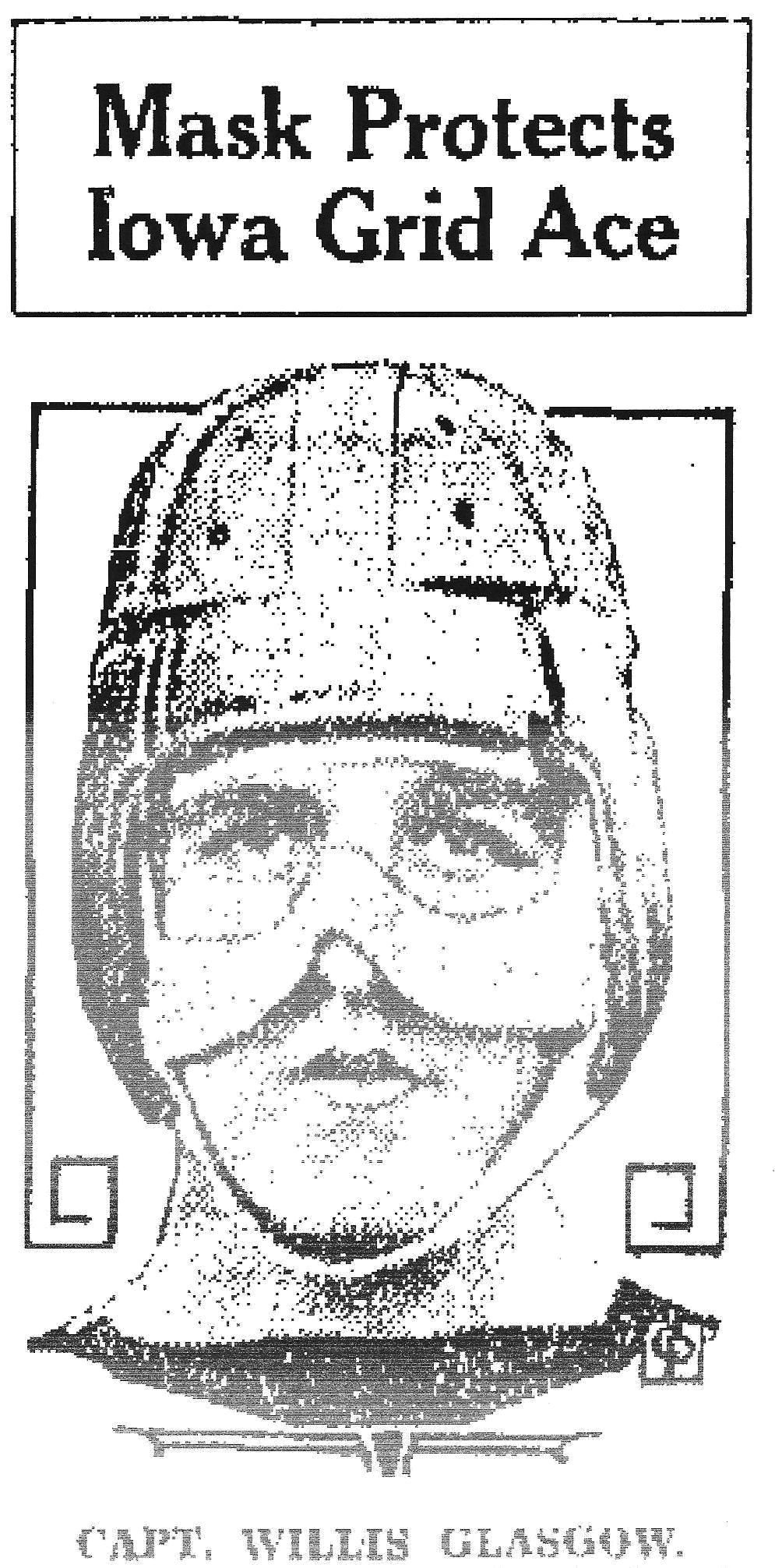
"Mask Protects Iowa Grid Ace" Captain Willis Glassgow
