= 1928 Wisconsin Badgers football team =

American college football season

1928 Wisconsin Badgers football
- Photographs of 3 team members.
- Conference: Big Ten Conference
- Record: 7–1–1 (3–1–1 Big Ten)
- Head coach: Glenn Thistlethwaite (2nd season)
- MVP: Bo Cuisinier
- Captain: Rube Wagner
- Home stadium: Camp Randall Stadium

1928 Big Ten Conference football standings
	Conf.					Overall
Team	W		L		T	W		L		T
No. 6 Illinois $	4	–	1	–	0	7	–	1	–	0
No. 4 Wisconsin	3	–	1	–	1	7	–	1	–	1
Minnesota	4	–	2	–	0	6	–	2	–	0
No. 6 Iowa	3	–	2	–	0	6	–	2	–	0
Ohio State	3	–	2	–	0	5	–	2	–	1
Purdue	2	–	2	–	1	5	–	2	–	1
Northwestern	2	–	3	–	0	5	–	3	–	0
Michigan	2	–	3	–	0	3	–	4	–	1
Indiana	2	–	4	–	0	4	–	4	–	0
Chicago	0	–	5	–	0	2	–	7	–	0
$ – Conference champion; Rankings from Dickinson System

The 1928 Wisconsin Badgers football team was an American football team that represented the University of Wisconsin in the 1928 Big Ten Conference football season. The team compiled a 7–1–1 record (3–1–1 against conference opponents), finished in second place in the Big Ten Conference, outscored all opponents by a combined total of 163 to 38, and was ranked No. 4 under the Dickinson System. Glenn Thistlethwaite was in his second year as Wisconsin's head coach. The team was ranked No. 4 in the nation in the Dickinson System ratings released in December 1928.

Quarterback Francis "Bo" Cuisinier was selected as the team's most valuable player. Guard Rube Wagner was the team captain. Wagner was also selected by the Associated Press (AP), United Press, and Walter Eckersall as a first-team player on the 1928 All-Big Ten Conference football team. Cuisinier was selected by the AP and Eckersall as a second-team All-Big Ten player.

The team played its home games at Camp Randall Stadium, which had a capacity of 38,293. During the 1928 season, the average attendance at home games was 29,334.

== Schedule ==
Date	Opponent	Site	Result	Attendance	Source
October 6	Notre Dame*	Camp Randall Stadium; Madison, WI	W 22–6	40,000	
October 13	Cornell (IA)*	Camp Randall Stadium; Madison, WI	W 49–0	12,000	
October 13	North Dakota State*	Camp Randall Stadium; Madison, WI	W 13–7		
October 20	at Purdue	Ross–Ade Stadium; West Lafayette, IN	T 19–19	15,000	
October 27	at Michigan	Michigan Stadium; Ann Arbor, MI	W 7–0	58,259	
November 3	Alabama*	Camp Randall Stadium; Madison, WI	W 15–0	25,000	
November 10	Chicago^{†}	Camp Randall Stadium; Madison, WI	W 25–0		
November 17	at Iowa	Iowa Field; Iowa City, IA (rivalry)	W 13–0		
November 24	Minnesota	Camp Randall Stadium; Madison, WI (rivalry)	L 0–6	10,000	
*Non-conference game; ^{†}Homecoming
