= 1928 Illinois Fighting Illini football team =

American college football season

1928 Illinois Fighting Illini football
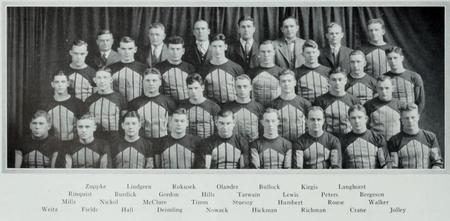

Big Ten champion
- Conference: Big Ten Conference
- Record: 7–1 (4–1 Big Ten)
- Head coach: Robert Zuppke (16th season)
- Captain: Butch Nowack
- Home stadium: Memorial Stadium

Uniform
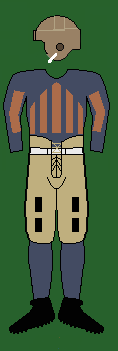

1928 Big Ten Conference football standings
| | Conf. | | | | | Overall |
| Team | W | | L | | T | W | | L | | T |
|---|---|---|---|---|---|---|---|---|---|---|
| No. 6 Illinois $ | 4 | – | 1 | – | 0 | 7 | – | 1 | – | 0 |
| No. 4 Wisconsin | 3 | – | 1 | – | 1 | 7 | – | 1 | – | 1 |
| Minnesota | 4 | – | 2 | – | 0 | 6 | – | 2 | – | 0 |
| No. 6 Iowa | 3 | – | 2 | – | 0 | 6 | – | 2 | – | 0 |
| Ohio State | 3 | – | 2 | – | 0 | 5 | – | 2 | – | 1 |
| Purdue | 2 | – | 2 | – | 1 | 5 | – | 2 | – | 1 |
| Northwestern | 2 | – | 3 | – | 0 | 5 | – | 3 | – | 0 |
| Michigan | 2 | – | 3 | – | 0 | 3 | – | 4 | – | 1 |
| Indiana | 2 | – | 4 | – | 0 | 4 | – | 4 | – | 0 |
| Chicago | 0 | – | 5 | – | 0 | 2 | – | 7 | – | 0 |
$ – Conference champion; Rankings from Dickinson System

The 1928 Illinois Fighting Illini football team was an American football team that represented the University of Illinois as a member of the Big Ten Conference during the 1928 Big Ten season. In their 16th season under head coach Robert Zuppke, the Illini compiled a 7–1 record (4–1 in conference games), won the Big Ten championship, shut out five of eight opponent, and outscored all opponents by a total of 145 to 16. The team was ranked No. 6 in the Dickinson System ratings released in December 1928.

Tackle Butch Nowack was the team captain. Nowack also received first-team honors from the AP, UP, and Walter Eckersall on the 1928 All-Big Ten Conference football team. Guard Russ Crane received second-team All-Big Ten honors from Eckersall.

== Schedule ==
| Date | Time | Opponent | Site | Result | Attendance | Source |
|---|---|---|---|---|---|---|
| October 6 | 2:30 p.m. | Bradley* | Memorial Stadium; Champaign, IL | W 33–6 | 21,477 | |
| October 13 | | Coe* | Memorial Stadium; Champaign, IL | W 31–0 | 8,562 | |
| October 20 | | Indiana | Memorial Stadium; Champaign, IL (rivalry) | W 13–7 | 26,683 | |
| October 27 | | at Northwestern^{†} | Memorial Stadium; Champaign, IL (rivalry) | W 6–0 | 59,871–63,000 | |
| November 3 | | Michigan | Michigan Stadium; Ann Arbor, MI (rivalry) | L 0–3 | 78,229 | |
| November 10 | | at Butler* | Butler Bowl; Indianapolis, IN | W 14–0 | 9,448–14,000 | |
| November 17 | | Chicago | Stagg Field; Chicago, IL | W 40–0 | 48,714 | |
| November 24 | | at Ohio State | Memorial Stadium; Champaign, IL (Illibuck) | W 8–0 | 35,712 | |
*Non-conference game; ^{†}Homecoming; All times are in Central time

== Roster ==
| Player | Position |
| Butch Nowack (Captain) | Tackle, Kicker |
| Russ Crane | Guard |
| Oliver M. 'Pete' Langhorst |
| Judson Timm | Halfback |
| Fritz Humbert | Fullback |
| Rinquist |
| Dwight Stuessy | Quarterback |
| Doug Mills | Fullback, Punter |
| Frank Walker | Fullback |
| Tom Nickol | Fullback |
| John Tarwain | End |
| James Lewis |
| Forrest 'Frosty' Peters | Kicker, Quarterback |
| Walter Jolley | End |
| Carl H. Bergeson |
| Keston J. Deimling | Guard |
| Rouse |
| Ken Fields | Quarterback |
| Louis Gordon | Guard |
| L. J. Wietz | Tackle |
| L. S. Burdick | Tackle |
| Norman McClure | Guard |
| Chuck Hall | Halfback |
| Robert Z. Hickman |
| H. E. Richman |
| Otto R. Hills |
| Olaf Robinson | Halfback |
| Lou Gordon | Tackle, Guard, End |

- Head coach: Robert Zuppke (15th year at Illinois)
