= 1928 Michigan Wolverines football team =

American college football season

1928 Michigan Wolverines football
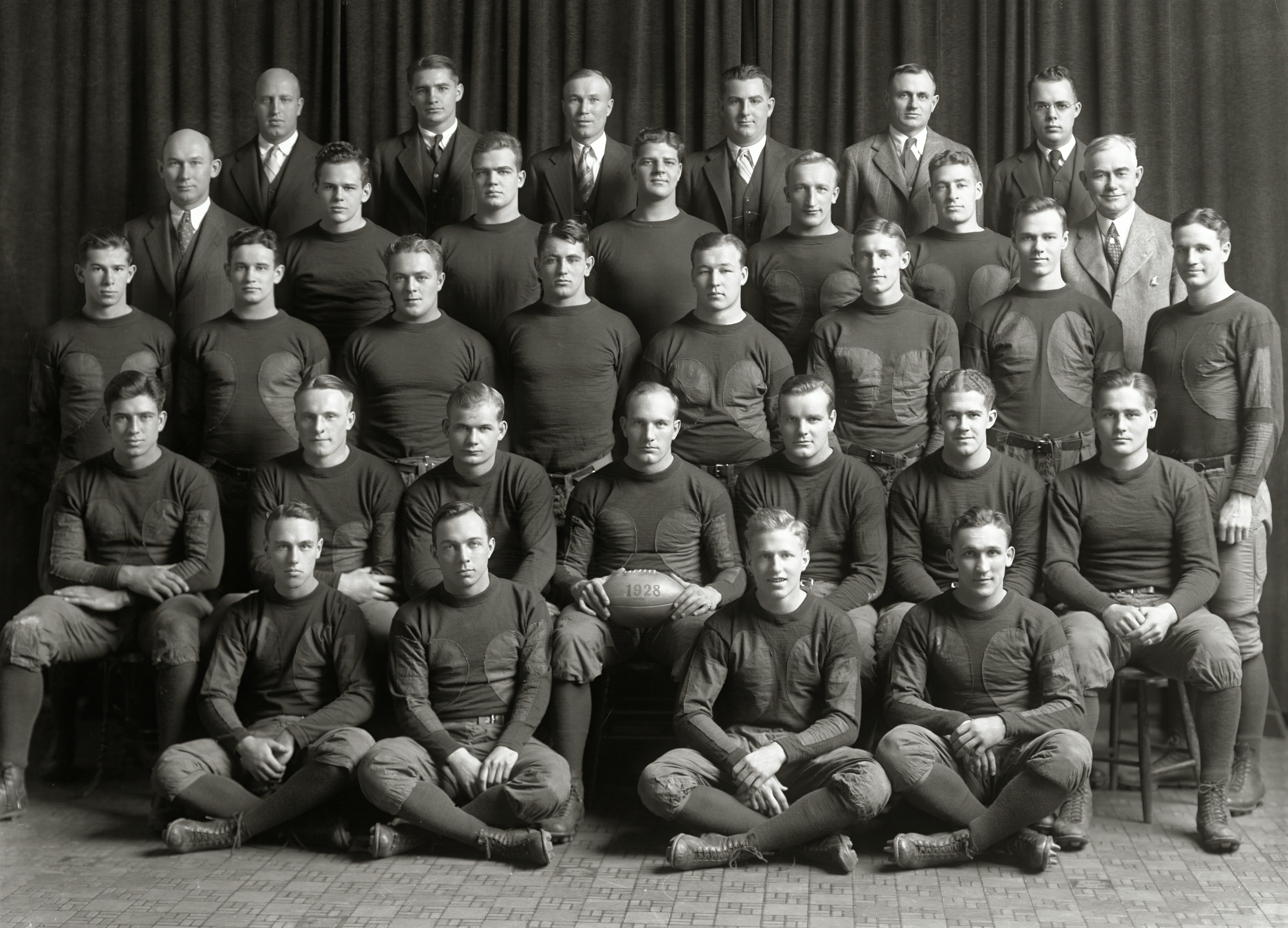
- Conference: Big Ten Conference
- Record: 3–4–1 (2–3 Big Ten)
- Head coach: Tad Wieman (2nd season)
- MVP: Otto Pommerening
- Captain: George Rich
- Home stadium: Michigan Stadium

Uniform
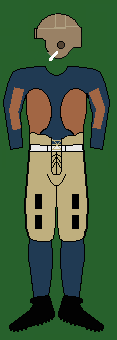

1928 Big Ten Conference football standings
	Conf.					Overall
Team	W		L		T	W		L		T
No. 6 Illinois $	4	–	1	–	0	7	–	1	–	0
No. 4 Wisconsin	3	–	1	–	1	7	–	1	–	1
Minnesota	4	–	2	–	0	6	–	2	–	0
No. 6 Iowa	3	–	2	–	0	6	–	2	–	0
Ohio State	3	–	2	–	0	5	–	2	–	1
Purdue	2	–	2	–	1	5	–	2	–	1
Northwestern	2	–	3	–	0	5	–	3	–	0
Michigan	2	–	3	–	0	3	–	4	–	1
Indiana	2	–	4	–	0	4	–	4	–	0
Chicago	0	–	5	–	0	2	–	7	–	0
$ – Conference champion; Rankings from Dickinson System

The 1928 Michigan Wolverines football team was an American football team that represented the University of Michigan in the 1928 Big Ten Conference football season. The Wolverines compiled a 3–4–1 record (2–3 against Big Ten opponents), tied for seventh place in the Big Ten, and were outscored by their opponents by a total of 62 to 36.

Before and during the season, a feud developed between head coach Tad Wieman and athletic director Fielding H. Yost, who had been the head coach until 1927. The team opened the season with four consecutive losses, the worst start by a Michigan football team to that point in time. During the losing streak, the Wolverines lost to Indiana, a program that had never beaten or even scored a point against a Michigan team, and Wisconsin, a program that had not beaten a Michigan team since 1899. The Wolverines finished the season with three wins and a tie; their victory over Big Ten champion Illinois spoiled an otherwise perfect season for the Illini. After the season, Wieman was removed as the team's head coach and replaced with Harry Kipke.

Quarterback/halfback George Rich was the team captain. Left tackle Otto Pommerening was selected as the team's most valuable player and as a consensus first-team player on the 1928 College Football All-America Team. Fullback Joe Gembis was the team's leading scorer with nine points on three extra points and two field goals.

== Schedule ==
Date	Opponent	Site	Result	Attendance
October 6	Ohio Wesleyan*	Michigan Stadium; Ann Arbor, MI	L 7–17	17,877
October 13	Indiana	Michigan Stadium; Ann Arbor, MI	L 0–6	25,896
October 20	at Ohio State	Ohio Stadium; Columbus, OH (rivalry)	L 7–19	72,439
October 27	Wisconsin	Michigan Stadium; Ann Arbor, MI	L 0–7	58,259
November 3	Illinois	Michigan Stadium; Ann Arbor, MI (rivalry)	W 3–0	78,229
November 10	at Navy*	Municipal Stadium; Baltimore, MD	T 6–6	28,433
November 17	Michigan State*	Michigan Stadium; Ann Arbor, MI (rivalry)	W 3–0	28,067
November 24	Iowa^{†}	Michigan Stadium; Ann Arbor, MI	W 10–7	53,572
*Non-conference game; ^{†}Homecoming

== Season summary ==
=== Pre-season and Wieman-Yost feud ===
In 1927, Michigan compiled a 6–2 record with Bennie Oosterbaan winning All-American honors for the third consecutive year. The 1927 team also included All-Big Ten Conference honorees Louis Gilbert at halfback and Ray Baer at guard. Oosterbaan, Gilbert, and Baer graduated in 1928, leaving coach Tad Wieman to rebuild the core of his team with new personnel.

The 1928 season saw conflict between Wieman and athletic director Fielding H. Yost. Before the season began, Yost became restless and announced that he would return to his head coaching responsibilities. After taking control from Wieman, Yost then announced to newspapers the night before the season opener that Wieman was once again the head football coach. Wieman told friends that Yost had failed to notify him in advance, and "he was the most surprised man in the country" when Yost made the announcement.

In October 1928, newspapers across the country reported that there had been a break between Yost and Wieman. The Detroit News reported, "While no official word of any eruption has been issued, it is well known in inner circles that Wieman is in rebellion and thinking seriously of leaving Ann Arbor." Wieman reportedly contended that he had never really been allowed to take control of the team and felt that he was being used as a scapegoat for the team's poor showing. In late October 1928, the athletic department issued a joint statement from Wieman and Yost denying any estrangement and noting that their relationship was too long and intimate to be jeopardized by "any minor misunderstandings." In an apparent compromise over responsibility for the team's poor showing, the statement noted, "For the handling of the football team up to October 5, Mr. Yost assumes full responsibility. Since the above date Mr. Wieman has been in charge as head coach."

=== Week 1: Ohio Wesleyan ===
Week 1: Ohio Wesleyan at Michigan

Team	1	2	3	4	Total
• Ohio Wesleyan	0	7	7	3	17
Michigan	0	0	7	0	7

- Date: October 6
- Location: Michigan Stadium
- Game attendance: 17,877

On October 6, 1928, the inexperienced Michigan team opened its 1928 season with a 17–7 loss to Ohio Wesleyan at Michigan Stadium. The game drew a crowd of between 50,000 and 55,000 persons, the largest crowd to watch an opening game in Michigan history. Michigan's lone touchdown was set up when Danny Holmes intercepted a pass and returned the ball to the Ohio Wesleyan two-yard line. George Rich then ran for the touchdown, and Joe Gembis kicked the extra point. Ohio Wesleyan scored touchdowns in the second and third quarters and kicked a field goal from the 27-yard line in the fourth quarter.

The Ohio Wesleyan band played "that old familiar air, 'We Don't Give a D--m for the Whole State of Michigan'" as it marched onto the field. The song was credited with inspiring Ohio Wesleyan to upset the Wolverines. According to another account, Ohio Wesleyan coach George Gauthier, a Michigan State alumnus, led his team in singing the song in the locker room before the game began.

Ohio Wesleyan's victory was branded "the greatest upset" in Michigan football history. It was also the first for a team from Ohio over the Wolverines since 1921.

=== Week 2: Indiana ===
Week 2: Indiana at Michigan

Team	1	2	3	4	Total
• Indiana	0	7	7	3	17
Michigan	0	0	7	0	7

- Date: October 13
- Location: Michigan Stadium
- Game attendance: 25,896

On October 13, 1928, Michigan lost to Indiana by a 6–0 score before a crowd of 40,000 at Michigan Stadium. There were nearly 55,000 empty seats in the stadium. Harry Bullion of the Detroit Free Press criticized Michigan's tackling and blocking and described the match as "a listless game". Neither team scored through the first three quarters. In the fourth quarter, Indiana drove for a touchdown. Hoosier halfback Frank Faunce faked an end run and cut back to the inside, running 18 yards for the game's only score. Indiana missed the kick for extra point.

The victory was Indiana's first ever against the Wolverines, and Faunce's touchdown marked the first time in a series dating back to 1900 that an Indiana team had scored a single point against a Michigan team. The Hoosiers out-gained the Wolverines by 206 rushing yards to 40. The Indianapolis Star described the game as "the greatest football day in Indiana's history within recent years."

=== Week 3: at Ohio State ===
Week 3: Michigan at Ohio State

Team	1	2	3	4	Total
Michigan	7	0	0	0	7
• Ohio State	6	6	0	7	19

- Date: October 20
- Location: Ohio Stadium, Columbus, OH
- Game attendance: 72,439

On October 20, 1928, Michigan lost its rivalry game with Ohio State by a 19–7 score before a crowd of 72,723 at Ohio Stadium in Columbus, Ohio. Ohio State dominated the game with 13 first downs to only one for Michigan. Byron Eby led the Buckeyes with 74 rushing yards on 17 carries. Michigan's touchdown was scored in the first quarter after a Michigan punt took an unexpected bounce, grazed Ohio State back Charles Coffee, and bounded into the end zone where it was recovered by Leo Draveling for a touchdown. Joe Gembis kicked the extra point. The defeat broke Michigan's six-game winning streak against Ohio State, a streak that dated back to 1922.

=== Week 4: Wisconsin ===
Week 4: Wisconsin at Michigan

Team	1	2	3	4	Total
• Wisconsin	0	0	0	7	7
Michigan	0	0	0	0	0

- Date: October 27
- Location: Michigan Stadium
- Game attendance: 58,259

On October 27, 1928, Michigan lost to Wisconsin by a 7–0 score before a crowd of 55,000 on a partially rain-soaked field at Michigan Stadium. The game remained scoreless until the final two minutes of the fourth quarter when the Badgers' Sammy Behr threw a pass to Bo Cuisinier who grabbed the ball from the arms of a Michigan defender and ran the remaining 25 yards for a touchdown. It was Wisconsin's first victory over a Michigan football team since 1899. The loss was Michigan's fourth in a row to open the 1928 season, the first time in school history that Michigan had opened a season so poorly.

=== Week 5: Illinois ===
Week 5: Illinois at Michigan

Team	1	2	3	4	Total
Illinois	0	0	0	0	0
• Michigan	3	0	0	0	3

- Date: November 3
- Location: Michigan Stadium
- Game attendance: 78,229

On November 3, 1928, Michigan defeated Illinois by a 3–0 before a crowd estimated at 90,000 persons at Michigan Stadium. In a match dominated by defense, Michigan gained 95 yards from scrimmage on 43 attempts, while Illinois gained 122 yards on 50 attempts. Joe Gembis scored the game's only points in the first quarter on a field goal from placement from the 35-yard line. Gembis' field goal was set up when Alvin Dahlem intercepted a pass and returned it to the Illini 20-yard line. Frosty Peters missed on two field goal attempts for the Illini. The outcome proved to be the only defeat for Robert Zuppke's Illini during the 1928 season, as Illinois won the Big Ten championship and shut out Northwestern, Chicago, and Ohio State.

=== Week 6: at Navy ===
Week 6: Michigan at Navy

Team	1	2	3	4	Total
Michigan	0	0	0	6	6
Navy	0	0	6	0	6

- Date: November 10
- Location: Municipal Stadium, Baltimore
- Game attendance: 28,433

On November 10, 1928, Michigan played Navy to a 6–6 tie before a crowd of approximately 35,000 at Municipal Stadium in Baltimore. After a scoreless first half, Johnny Gannon of Navy returned the second-half kickoff for 72 yards to Michigan's eight-yard lines. Gannon then ran for the touchdown on third down. Gannon's kick for extra point went wide. Michigan fullback Joe Gembis was injured prior to the game and was unavailable to play against Navy. Michigan tied the game in the fourth quarter when backup fullback Stanley Hozer led a 50-yard drive culminating with a short touchdown run. Michigan's kick for extra point was blocked. As time ran out, Navy attempted a field goal that went wide of the goal post.

Michigan wore "bright yellow jerseys" for the game. One newspaper account described the new jerseys, unveiled for the Navy game, as "screeching yellow" and "of almost a screaming canary" color. The new jerseys "caused quite a stir", and was the first time in "many, many years" that Michigan had discarded its regular blue outfits. Coach Wieman ordered the yellow jerseys after Navy refused to depart from its traditional blue jerseys.

=== Week 7: Michigan State ===
Week 7: Michigan State at Michigan

Team	1	2	3	4	Total
Michigan State	0	0	0	0	0
• Michigan	0	3	0	0	3

- Date: November 3
- Location: Michigan Stadium
- Game attendance: 28,067

On November 17, 1928, Michigan won its rivalry game against Michigan State by a 3–0 score before a crowd of 28,067 at Michigan Stadium in Ann Arbor. Morris Hughes kicked a field goal from placement for Michigan in the second quarter. Michigan out-gained Michigan State by 110 net rushing yards to 29, and Michigan State out-gained Michigan in passing yards by 74 yards to 33 yards. Despite the victory, Harry Bullion wrote in the Detroit Free Press that Michigan "played one of the worst football games they ever thought the system in force at Ann Arbor could display to public scrutiny." Michigan State's head coach for the 1928 season was Harry Kipke, the former Wolverine All-American who became Michigan's head coach starting in 1929.

=== Week 8: Iowa ===
Week 8: Iowa at Michigan

Team	1	2	3	4	Total
Iowa	7	0	0	0	7
• Michigan	0	3	7	0	10

- Date: November 24
- Location: Michigan Stadium
- Game attendance: 53,572

On November 24, 1928, Michigan defeated Iowa by a 10–7 score before a crowd of nearly 70,000 at Michigan Stadium. Michigan again wore its "screaming yellow jerseys" rather than the traditional blue jerseys. Iowa halfback Willis Glassgow ran 55 yards for a touchdown in the first quarter. Michigan fullback Joe Gembis kicked a field goal from the 27-yard line in the second period. Michigan halfback Alvin Dahlem ran 15 yards for a touchdown in the third quarter to put Michigan in the lead. Gembis kicked the extra point.

=== Post-season ===
After the season, tackle Otto Pommerening was named the most valuable player on the 1928 Michigan team. He was also a consensus first-team tackle on the 1928 All-America team, receiving first-team honors from the Associated Press, United Press, Collier's Weekly (Grantland Rice), and the International News Service. Pommerening was also the only Michigan player to be honored on the 1928 All-Big Ten Conference football teams.

Wieman was removed as the team's head coach in late May 1929.

== Personnel ==
=== Varsity letter winners ===
The following players won varsity letters for their work on the 1928 football team: Players who started at least half of Michigan's games are displayed in bold.

- Marshall H. Boden - end
- **Alan Bovard** - started 6 games at center
- Francis M. Cornwell - end
- **Raymond A. Cragin** - started 2 games at center, 2 games at left guard, 1 game at right tackle
- Alvin G. Dahlem - started 2 games at right halfback, 1 game at left halfback
- **Leo Draveling** - started 7 games at right end
- **Joe Gembis** - started 5 games at fullback
- Walter E. Geistert - halfback
- Daniel W. Holmes - halfback
- Stanley J. Hozer - started 2 games at fullback
- **Bruce W. Hulburt** - started 4 games at right tackle
- J. Wilfred Orwig - started 1 games at right end
- **Howard W. Poe** - started 6 games at left guard, 1 game at right guard
- **Otto Pommerening** - started 7 games at left tackle, 1 game at left end
- Edwin B. Poorman - tackle
- **George E. Rich** - started 4 games at quarterback, 2 games at left halfback, 1 game at right halfback, 1 game at fullback
- **James Simrall** - started 3 games at left halfback, 2 games at right halfback
- George G. Squier - started 1 game at right guard, 1 game at right tackle
- **Alfred E. Steinke** - started 6 games at right guard
- Harvey G. Straub - started 3 games at quarterback
- John H. G. Totzke - started 1 game at left halfback, 1 game at right halfback
- **Joseph Truskowski** - started 7 games at left end, 1 game at left tackle
- John R. Wheeler - started 2 games at right halfback, 1 game at left halfback
- Richard Jamison Williams - started 2 games at right tackle

=== aMa letter winners ===
The following players won aMa letters for their work on the 1928 football team:

- Carl J. Bauer
- Milton E. Bergman - tackle
- Clarence A. Biedenweg - halfback
- Frank P. Brown - quarterback
- William A. Brown - center
- Clare F. Carter - end
- Thomas M. Cook - center
- William J. Dansby - fullback
- Harold H. Hager - tackle
- Morris Hughes - fullback
- Douglass Kerr - end
- Richard M. Lytle - fullback
- Jennings McBride - halfback
- Ernest B. McCoy - end
- Robert O. Morgan - guard
- Ray F. Parker - guard
- Robert J. Patton - center
- Marion A. Sherwood - center
- Harsen A. Smith - end
- Dominic E. Sullo
- John C. Widman - halfback
- John D. Whittle - halfback; started 1 game at quarterback
- Donald L. Wilson

=== Awards and honors ===
- Captain: George Rich
- All-Americans: Otto Pommerening
- All-Conference: Otto Pommerening
- Most Valuable Player: Otto Pommerening
- Meyer Morton Award: Danny Holmes

=== Coaching staff ===
- Head coach: Tad Wieman
- Assistant coaches: Jack Blott, Robert J. Brown, Franklin Cappon, Ray Courtright, Cliff Keen, Ray Fisher, William Flora, James Miller, Bennie Oosterbaan, B.P. Traynor, George F. Veenker, Fielding H. Yost
- Trainer: Charles B. Hoyt
- Manager: Dana M. Norton, Edward J. Bellaire (assistant), Fred Widmann (assistant), Richard B. Fogarty (assistant), Harry W. Wallace (assistant)

=== Scoring leaders ===
Player	Touchdowns	Extra points	Field goals	Total
Joe Gembis	0	3	2	9
Alvin Dahlem	1	0	0	6
Leo Draveling	1	0	0	6
Stanley Hozer	1	0	0	6
George Rich	1	0	0	6
Morris Hughes	0	0	1	3
**Total**	**4**	**3**	**3**	**36**
