= Tall Grass Game =

1928 Notre Dame vs. Wisconsin football game "Tall Grass Game"
Notre Dame Fighting Irish	Wisconsin Badgers
(1–0)	(0–0)
6	22
Head coach: Knute Rockne	Head coach: Glenn Thistlethwaite
	1	2	3	4	Total
Notre Dame	0	6	0	0	6
Wisconsin	2	0	13	7	22
- Date: October 6, 1928
- Season: 1928
- Stadium: Camp Randall Stadium
- Location: Madison, Wisconsin
- Attendance: 40,000

The Tall Grass Game was the 1928 Notre Dame vs. Wisconsin football game played on October 6, 1928, between the Notre Dame Fighting Irish and Wisconsin Badgers. Notre Dame, coached by Knute Rockne, arrived in Madison, Wisconsin, only to find that the grass on the football field at Camp Randall Stadium had not been mowed in a week. Rumor was that Wisconsin coach Glenn Thistlethwaite wanted to slow down the speedy Notre Dame Irish players. Rockne demanded the field be trimmed and Thistlethwaite refused.

The game was considered to be one of the premier non-conference games of the time. Before the game began, a stadium-record 40,000 fans were expected to attend the game, an attendance mark that was achieved.

The Badgers upset the Irish 22–6, and Wisconsin fans still refer to the game as "The Victory In The Tall Grass." It was called the first win by a Big Ten Conference team over Notre Dame in over a decade, although the Fighting Irish had actually lost to the Iowa Hawkeyes only seven years prior to the game. The Badgers broke the Irish's 14-game streak against Big ten opponents and became only the second team to defeat them since their blackballing from the league was rescinded in 1917.
