= Lawrence Walkup =

American academic administrator (1914–2002)

11th President of Northern Arizona University
- In office 1957–1979
- Succeeded by: Eugene M. Hughes

Personal details
- Born: James Lawrence Walkup; February 26, 1914 Wheeling, Missouri, U.S.
- Died: August 7, 2002 (aged 88) Flagstaff, Arizona, U.S.
- Spouse: Lucy Meloy (m. 1943)
- Children: 1
- Education: Central Missouri State College (BS); University of Missouri (MS, PhD)

Military service
- Branch/service: United States Navy
- Battles/wars: World War II

James Lawrence Walkup (February 26, 1914 – August 7, 2002) was an American academic administrator who served as the eleventh president of Northern Arizona University from 1957 to 1979. He developed the school from a teachers' college to one with 152 degree specializations.

== Early life and education ==
Walkup was born in Wheeling, Missouri to college-educated parents, John L. and Jessie D. Walkup. He had two brothers named Allen and Lucian and attended the Wheeling Baptist Church. He graduated from high school in 1932 as the salutatorian of his class. In 1936, he earned a bachelor's degree from Central Missouri State College, where he majored in chemical and biological sciences. He earned a Master of Science degree in science education from the University of Missouri.

== Career ==
After college, he became an educator of math, science, and commerce, eventually becoming superintendent in Blackburn, Missouri. He served in the United States Navy as a course analyst for cadet training during World War II.

=== Northern Arizona University ===
==== Early leadership ====
In 1948, Walkup earned his doctorate degree from the University of Missouri and was recruited by Lacey Eastburn to come to Arizona State College, now known as NAU, as an instructor. One of his first duties was to become director of the college's elementary school. In 1950, he became the head of the education department, the director of placement and the chair of the graduate council. In 1951, he became a Dean of Instruction and developed a whole new curriculum to re-attain the program's accreditation from the North Central Association. He also developed the college's new graduate program.

He was named dean of the College of Education in 1955 and was appointed president of Northern Arizona University in 1957.

==== Presidency ====
As President, Walkup tried to anticipate what a growing campus would need. In 1958, he organized the school into seven divisions. In the early-1960s, he started a building program and the college's enrollment climbed throughout the decade. He added a nursing program to the school's offerings in 1961.

In 1966, he oversaw the renaming of the school from Arizona State College at Flagstaff to Northern Arizona University. Two years later, NAU began offering Doctorates of Philosophy and Education, and the first doctoral candidates graduated in 1973. Walkup oversaw the building of the South Campus which was completed in 1971.

The Walkups were known for inviting students to their home for special occasions. "Lucy was the first lady on campus," Walkup said. He retired in 1979.

=== Community leadership ===
Walkup was elected president of the Flagstaff Chamber of Commerce in 1958. In 1964, he was elected to the board of directors of the First National Bank of Arizona. He was elected chairman of the selection committee for Rhodes Scholarships in Arizona in 1966. That same year he was selected Flagstaff's Citizen of the Year. In 1969, he was named national president of the American Association of Colleges for Teacher Education.

His community memberships have included the Church of the Master Baptist Church, the NAU Heritage Society, the NAU President's Circle, Sigma Pi fraternity, Kappa Phi Kappa educational fraternity, Kappa Delta Pi, Phi Delta Kappa and the Museum of Northern Arizona's Board of Directors. He was also a founding planner of Arizona Town Hall.

=== Retirement ===
In 1995, Walkup was named an "Arizona Historymaker" by the Arizona Historical Society. He spent much of his time in Wheeling, Missouri where he owned a thousand-acre farm. To honor him, the Arizona House of Representatives unanimously approved House Concurrent Resolution 2030. He also wrote six books, including two NAU books and two Walkup heritage books.

== Personal life ==
While in the Navy, he married Lucy Meloy on June 2, 1943. She was an English and music teacher. They had a daughter named Susan. After his death, he was buried in Wheeling, Missouri. The Walkup Skydome in Flagstaff was named in his honor. The facility is the third largest clear span timber dome in the world.
