= Chuck Bennett =

American football player and coach (1907–1973)

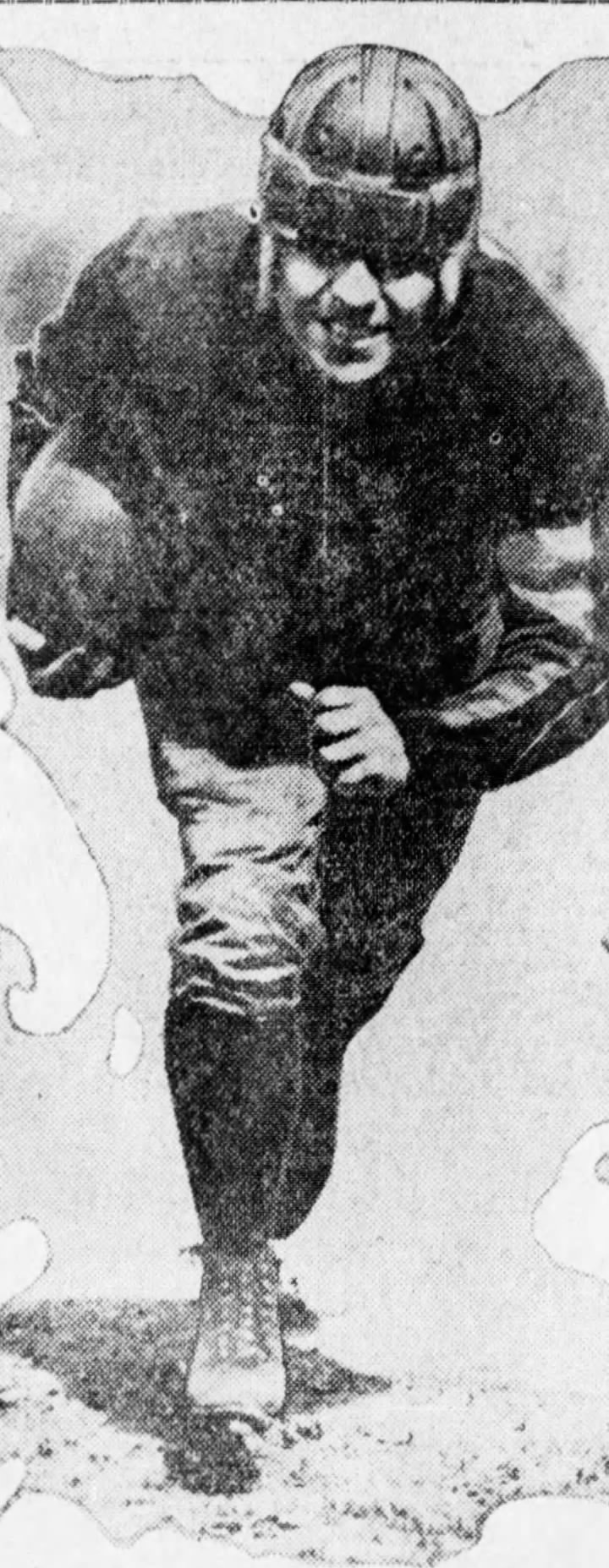
- Bennett in 1928

No. 21, 48
- Position: Halfback

Personal information
- Born: August 9, 1907; Linton, Indiana, U.S.
- Died: June 9, 1973 (aged 65); La Grange, Illinois, U.S.

Career information
- High school: Linton (IN)
- College: Indiana

Career history

Playing
- 1930–1931: Portsmouth Spartans
- 1933: Chicago Cardinals

Coaching
- 1939–1960: Lyons Township High School

athletic director
- 1939–1966: Lyons Township High School

Awards and highlights
- Chicago Tribune Silver Football (1928); First-team All-Big Ten (1928)

Charles Henry Bennett (August 9, 1907 – June 9, 1973) was an American football player and coach. He played halfback for the Indiana University football team from 1926 to 1928 and won the 1928 Chicago Tribune Silver Football trophy as the most valuable player in the Big Ten Conference. He also played professional football for the Portsmouth Spartans from 1930 to 1931 and for the Chicago Cardinals in 1933. After retiring as a football player, Bennett was a high school coach and athletic director from 1934 to 1966.

== Biography ==
=== Early life ===
Bennett was born in Linton, Indiana and attended Linton High School. He led the school to two consecutive state football championships and was unanimously selected as an all-state halfback both years. He reportedly "built up his strong physique by hard work in the coal mines."

=== College football ===
After graduating from Linton High School, Bennett enrolled at Indiana University where he played halfback for the Indiana Hoosiers football team from 1926 to 1928. During this time, he was five feet, nine inches tall and one hundred and ninety three pounds.

==== 1926 ====
As a freshman in 1926, Bennett scored two touchdowns in the season opener against DePauw. Indiana won the season opener 31–7 but finished the season with a 3–5 record. Bennett scored seven of the team's eleven touchdowns.

==== 1927 ====
In 1927, Indiana compiled a 3–4–1 record and scored 104 points in eight games. Bennett played all 60 minutes in the 1927 games against Chicago, Minnesota and Harvard. In the Harvard game, played in Cambridge, Massachusetts, Bennett accounted for Indiana's only points on a 30-yard touchdown run. At the end of the 1927 season, Bennett's teammates elected him offensive captain of the 1928 Indiana football team.

==== 1928 ====
As a senior in 1928, Bennett gained acclaim for his durability and running. In the season opener against Wabash College, Bennett scored both of Indiana's touchdowns on runs of 35 yards. Indiana won the opener 14–0. In the second game of the 1928 season, Bennett scored Indiana's only touchdown on a 30-yard run in a 10–7 win against Oklahoma. The third game of the 1928 season matched Indiana against Michigan at Michigan Stadium. Indiana had never beaten Michigan, but Bennett played all 60 minutes of the game, and his long runs helped lead the Hoosiers to their first win against the Wolverines—by a 6–0 score. After winning the first three games of the season, Indiana played Big Ten Conference champion Illinois. Illinois won the game at Champaign, Illinois by a score of 13–7. Bennett scored Indiana's only touchdown in the Illinois game on a 24-yard run, completed several forward passes and had the Hoosiers at Illini two-yard line when time ran out. Bennett's touchdown was the only one allowed by Illinois against any Big Ten team in 1928, and Illinois coach Bob Zuppke praised Bennett's performance. Bennett later led Indiana to a 6–0 win over Northwestern with a 72-yard touchdown run down the sidelines on a muddy field in Bloomington, Indiana. Bennett played his final game for Indiana on November 24, 1928, against Purdue. Indiana lost the game 14–0 despite Bennett's gaining 149 yards on 35 carries, including runs of 28, 23, 14 and 12 yards.

Despite playing for a ninth place team that scored only 55 points and compiled a 4–4 record (an average of 6.9 points per game), Bennett was awarded the 1928 Chicago Tribune Silver Football trophy as the most valuable player in the Big Ten Conference. He was also invited to play on the East team in the annual East–West Shrine Game in California. Bennett scored two touchdowns for the East team and won the game's Outstanding Player award. After Bennett was awarded the Silver Football trophy and played in the Shrine Game, Indiana coach Pat Page praised Bennett in an interview with the Chicago Daily Tribune:

"Bennett is an inspirational player. He is a leader and he has proven himself a wonderful ball carrier on all occasions. He has had the real stuff to carry on for the last three years, working untiringly both in the spring and fall practices, and has missed few workouts in his three years."

Bennett also received the first Balfour Award in football as Indiana's most valuable football player. He was also a popular student on the Bloomington campus, where he was elected president of the junior class and was a member of Delta Upsilon fraternity and the Sphinx Club, an honorary organization.

=== Professional football ===
In June 1929, Bennett signed a contract to play professional football for the Portsmouth Spartans, predecessor of the Detroit Lions. The Spartans in 1929 were an independent team and did not become part of the National Football League until 1930. The signing of Bennett was intended to lend credibility to the fledgling organization. At the time of Bennett's signing, the Portsmouth Daily Times noted: "His presence on the team will add a lot of color, prestige and, best of all, a real driving power. He is a demon in toting the pigskin." Bennett played professional football for the Portsmouth Spartans from 1929 to 1931. He also played for the Chicago Cardinals in 1933.

=== Coach and athletic director ===
After retiring as a football player, Bennett became a football coach. He began his coaching career as a high school football and track coach in LaPorte, Indiana. He coached at LaPorte from 1934 to 1937. In May 1937, he accepted a position as football coach and athletic director at the high school in Austin, Minnesota, where he remained for two years.

In 1939, Bennett was hired as a football coach and athletic director at Lyons Township High School in La Grange, Illinois. He coached the Lyons Township football team for 21 years and won 11 West Suburban Conference championships. Players he coached include future Buffalo Bills and Denver Broncos head coach Lou Saban. In 1958, the Chicago Tribune credited Bennett with turning the school into an athletic power: "In his 20th year as athletic director and football coach at Lyons Township High school in La Grange, Chuck Bennett can point with pride to a truly impressive record -- certainly one of the best in the Chicago area prep field."

Bennett resigned as head football coach in 1960 but continued to serve as the school's athletic director. On 20 occasions, Bennett won the President's Cup at Lyons Township, awarded for overall sports supremacy in the West Suburban Conference. He retired as athletic director at Lyons Township in June 1966 due to ill health.

=== Family and death ===
Bennett died in 1973 at age 65. He was survived by his wife, Charlotta (Diddy) Bennett, and two sons, Charles H. Bennett and Byron Bennett. Charles H. Bennett later had four children, Richard, Fred, Charles, and Jenny. His name lives on in the next generation through Charles R. Bennett, son of Richard.The varsity football field at Lyons Township is named Bennett Field in his honor.
