= George Rich (American football) =

American football player and coach (1904–1989)

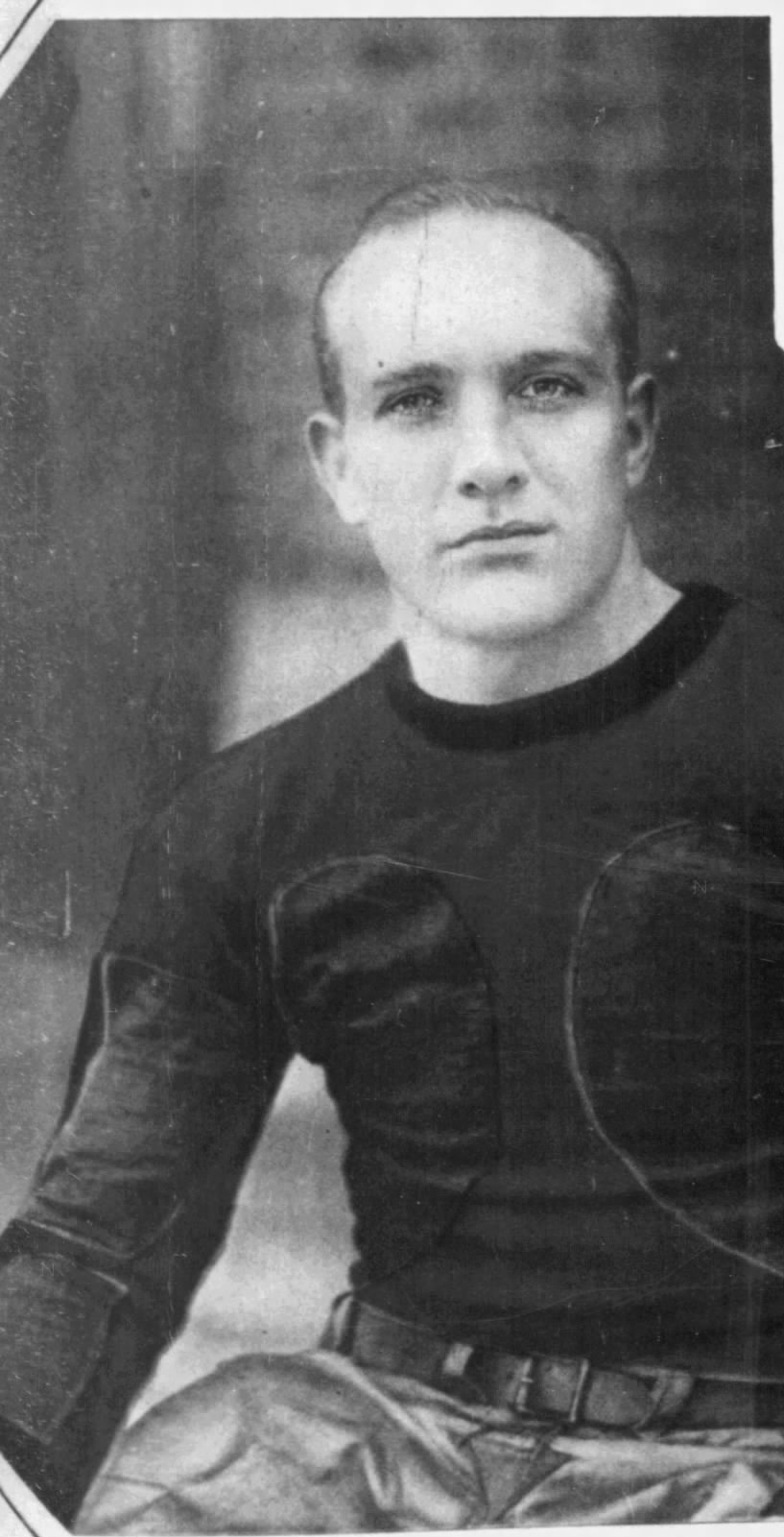
- Rich in 1928.

Biographical details
- Born: December 14, 1904; Syracuse, New York, U.S.
- Died: July 16, 1989 (aged 84); Sarasota, Florida, U.S.

Playing career
- 1925–1928: Michigan
- Position: Quarterback

Coaching career (HC unless noted)
- 1930: Michigan (freshmen)
- 1931–1934: Denison

Head coaching record
- Overall: 10–19–4

George Ellsworth Rich (December 14, 1904 – July 16, 1989) was an American football player and coach. He played for the Michigan Wolverines football team from 1926 to 1928 and was the captain and starting quarterback of the 1928 Michigan Wolverines football team. He was the head coach of the Denison Big Red football team from 1931 to 1934.

== Early years ==
Rich was born in New York and grew up in Lakewood, Ohio. His parents were Charles T. Rich and Jessie (Walthart) Rich.

== University of Michigan ==
Rich attended the University of Michigan where he was a student in a five-year arts and law program. He played college football as a quarterback, fullback, and halfback for Fielding H. Yost and Tad Wieman's Michigan Wolverines football teams, playing at the halfback position in 1926 and the fullback position in 1927. In November 1927, he was selected as the captain of the 1928 Michigan Wolverines football team. He started four games at quarterback, three games at halfback and one game at fullback for the 1928 team that compiled a 3–4–1 record and finished in seventh place in the Big Ten Conference. Rich also won a letter as a wrestler in 1926.

Rich was married to Ethel Dunn, a teacher, in January 1929. He was the freshman football coach at the University of Michigan during the 1929 season. At the time of the 1930 United States Census, Rich was living in Ann Arbor, Michigan, with his wife, Ethel, and their three-month-old daughter, Patricia. Rich reported no occupation at that time.

== Denison University ==
In February 1931, Rich was hired as the head coach of the Denison Big Red football team. He served in that capacity from 1931 to 1934. In his first three seasons, he compiled a 4–18–3 record before turning the program around and leading the 1934 team to a 6–1–1 record. While at Denison, Rich also taught commercial law. He resigned as Denison's coach in January 1935 in order to begin a law practice.

== Later years ==
At the time of the 1940 United States Census, Rich was living in Lakewood, Ohio, with his wife Ethel and their two children, Patricia (age 10) and George E. Jr. (age 5). Rich was employed as a lawyer working in the area of old age pensions. Rich died in 1989 in Sarasota, Florida, at age 84.

== Head coaching record ==
Year	Team	Overall	Conference	Standing	Bowl/playoffs
Denison Big Red (Buckeye Athletic Association) (1931–1932)
1931	Denison	0–6–2	0–4	6th	
1932	Denison	2–6	0–4	6th	
Denison Big Red (Ohio Athletic Conference) (1933–1934)
1933	Denison	2–6–1	2–3–1	T–14th	
1934	Denison	6–1–1	6–0–1	T–1st	
Denison:		10–19–4	8–7–2		
Total:		10–19–4			
