= 1928 Iowa Hawkeyes football team =

American college football season

1928 Iowa Hawkeyes football
- Conference: Big Ten Conference
- Record: 6–2 (3–2 Big Ten)
- Head coach: Burt Ingwersen (5th season)
- MVP: Willis Glassgow
- Captain: Richard Brown
- Home stadium: Iowa Field

1928 Big Ten Conference football standings
	Conf.					Overall
Team	W		L		T	W		L		T
No. 6 Illinois $	4	–	1	–	0	7	–	1	–	0
No. 4 Wisconsin	3	–	1	–	1	7	–	1	–	1
Minnesota	4	–	2	–	0	6	–	2	–	0
No. 6 Iowa	3	–	2	–	0	6	–	2	–	0
Ohio State	3	–	2	–	0	5	–	2	–	1
Purdue	2	–	2	–	1	5	–	2	–	1
Northwestern	2	–	3	–	0	5	–	3	–	0
Michigan	2	–	3	–	0	3	–	4	–	1
Indiana	2	–	4	–	0	4	–	4	–	0
Chicago	0	–	5	–	0	2	–	7	–	0
$ – Conference champion; Rankings from Dickinson System

The 1928 Iowa Hawkeyes football team was an American football team represented the University of Iowa as a member of the Big Ten Conference during the 1928 Big Ten football season. In their fifth year under head coach Burt Ingwersen, the Hawkeyes compiled a 6–2 record (3–2 in conference games), tied for fourth place in the Big Ten, and outscored opponents by a total of 147 to 42. The team was ranked No. 6 in the final Dickinson Ratings released in December 1928.

The team played its home games at Iowa Field in Iowa City, Iowa.

== Schedule ==
Date	Opponent	Site	Result	Attendance	Source
October 6	Monmouth (IL)*	Iowa Field; Iowa City, IA	W 26–0		
October 13	at Chicago	Stagg Field; Chicago, IL	W 13–0		
October 20	Ripon*	Iowa Field; Iowa City, IA	W 61–6		
October 27	Minnesota^{†}	Iowa Field; Iowa City, IA (rivalry)	W 7–6	30,000	
November 3	South Dakota*	Iowa Field; Iowa City, IA	W 19–0		
November 10	at Ohio State	Ohio Stadium; Columbus, OH	W 14–7	47,000	
November 17	Wisconsin	Camp Randall Stadium; Madison, WI (rivalry)	L 0–13		
November 24	at Michigan	Michigan Stadium; Ann Arbor, MI	L 7–10	53,572	
*Non-conference game; ^{†}Homecoming
