= Walt Holmer =

American football player and coach (1902–1976)

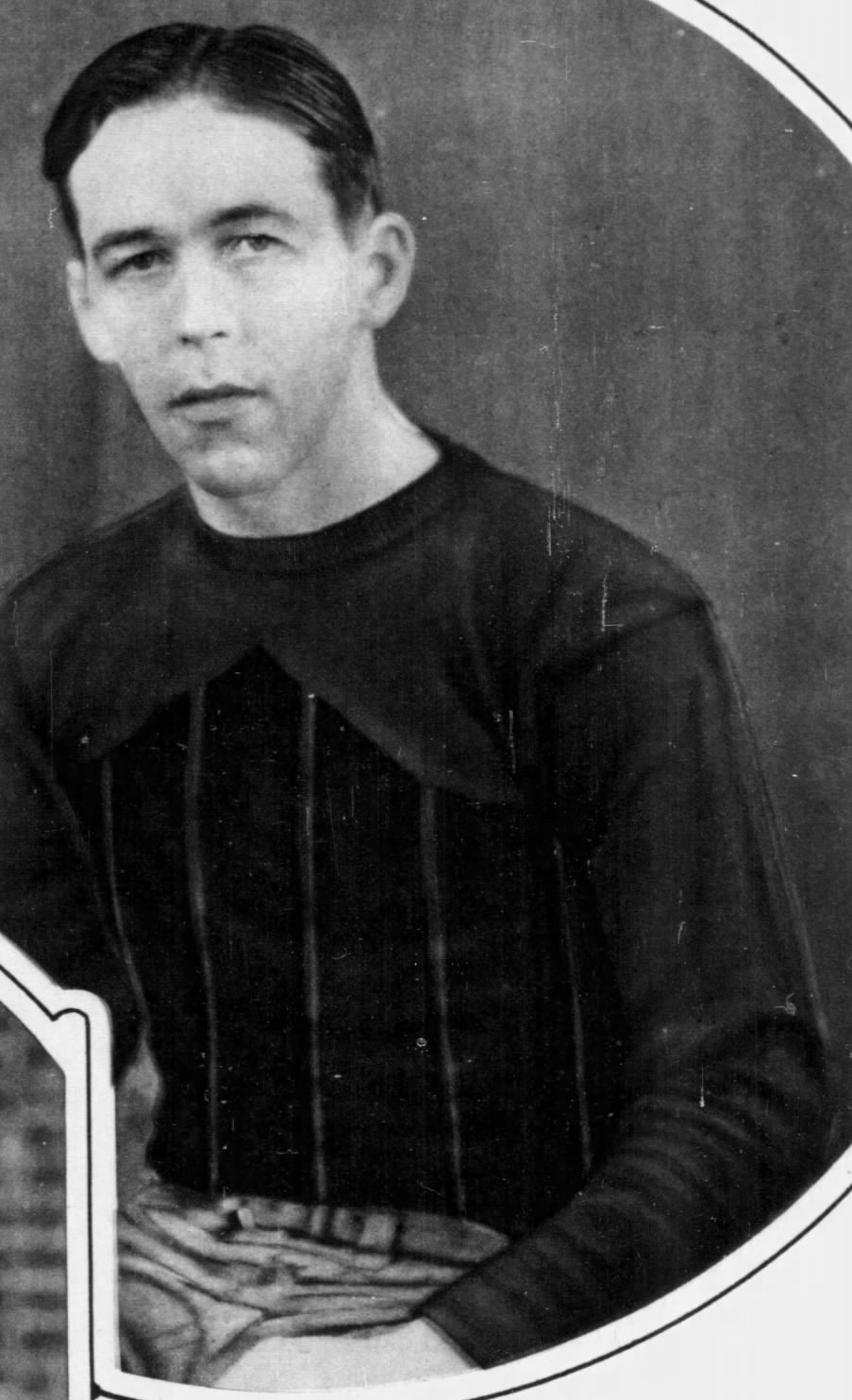
- Holmer in 1928

Biographical details
- Born: December 5, 1902; Moline, Illinois, U.S.
- Died: August 27, 1976 (aged 73); Cashmere, Washington, U.S.

Playing career
- 1926–1928: Northwestern
- 1929–1930: Chicago Bears
- 1931–1932: Chicago Cardinals
- 1933: Boston Redskins
- 1933: Pittsburgh Pirates
- Positions: Quarterback, running back

Coaching career (HC unless noted)
- 1934–1941: Boston University (backfield)
- 1942: Boston University
- 1945–1946: Boston University
- 1947–1950: Colby

Head coaching record
- Overall: 18–27–4

Accomplishments and honors

Championships
- MIAA (1949)

Awards
- First-team All-Big Ten (1928)

Walter Ree Holmer (December 5, 1902 – August 27, 1976) was an American football player and coach. He played professionally as a quarterback and running back in the National Football League (NFL) for the Chicago Bears, Chicago Cardinals, Boston Redskins, and the Pittsburgh Pirates. Holmer served as the head football coach at Boston University from 1942 to 1946 and at Colby College from 1947 to 1950.

== Playing ==
A native of Moline, Illinois, Holmer was a standout fullback at Northwestern University under Dick Hanley from 1926 to 1928. He was captain of the 1928 Northwestern Wildcats football team and was named to the teat year's All-Big Ten Conference football team. Holmer then played five seasons in the NFL, where he completed 36 of 110 passes for 642 yards and 7 touchdowns and rushed for 266 yards and 4 touchdowns.

== Coaching ==
In 1934, Pat Hanley, Dick Hanley's brother and assistant coach, made Holmer his lead assistant at Boston University. While coaching at BU, Holmer also earned a bachelor's degree in education from the Boston University College of Education. As an assistant, Holmer coached future NFL running back Gary Famiglietti and helped develop Solly Nechtem, who had only played one year in high school, and Walter Williams, who had never played high school football, into top college players. In 1942, Hanley was ordered to active duty with the United States Marine Corps and Holmer succeeded him as head coach. Holmer left B.U. in March 1943 to join the United States Navy Reserve. After he completed his indoctrination course at the Navy pre-flight school at the University of North Carolina at Chapel Hill, Holmer remained at the school as an instructor for the Navy's physical training program for aviation. Boston University did not play football in 1943 or 1944, but returned to the field the following year under interim head coach Robert McKelvey. Holmer was discharged from the Navy later that year and resumed his coaching duties on November 5, 1945. He resigned after a 5–2–1 1946 season and became the physical education director at Cushing General Hospital in Framingham, Massachusetts.

Three months after leaving Boston University, Holmer returned to football as the head coach at Colby College. He compiled a 9–17–2 record over four seasons. He resigned on December 14, 1950.

Holmer died on August 27, 1976, in Cashmere, Washington.

== Head coaching record ==
Year	Team	Overall	Conference	Standing	Bowl/playoffs
Boston University Terriers (Independent) (1942)
1942	Boston University	4–5			
Boston University Terriers (Independent) (1945–1946)
1945	Boston University	0–2			
1946	Boston University	5–2–1			
Boston University:		9–7–1			
Colby Mules (Maine Intercollegiate Athletic Association) (1947–1950)
1947	Colby	1–6	1–2		
1948	Colby	1–6–1	0–3	4th	
1949	Colby	3–3–2	2–0–1	T–1st	
1950	Colby	4–3	1–2		
Colby:		9–18–3	4–7–1		
Total:		18–25–4			
National championship Conference title Conference division title or championship game berth
