= Richard Brown (center) =

American football player (1907–1990)

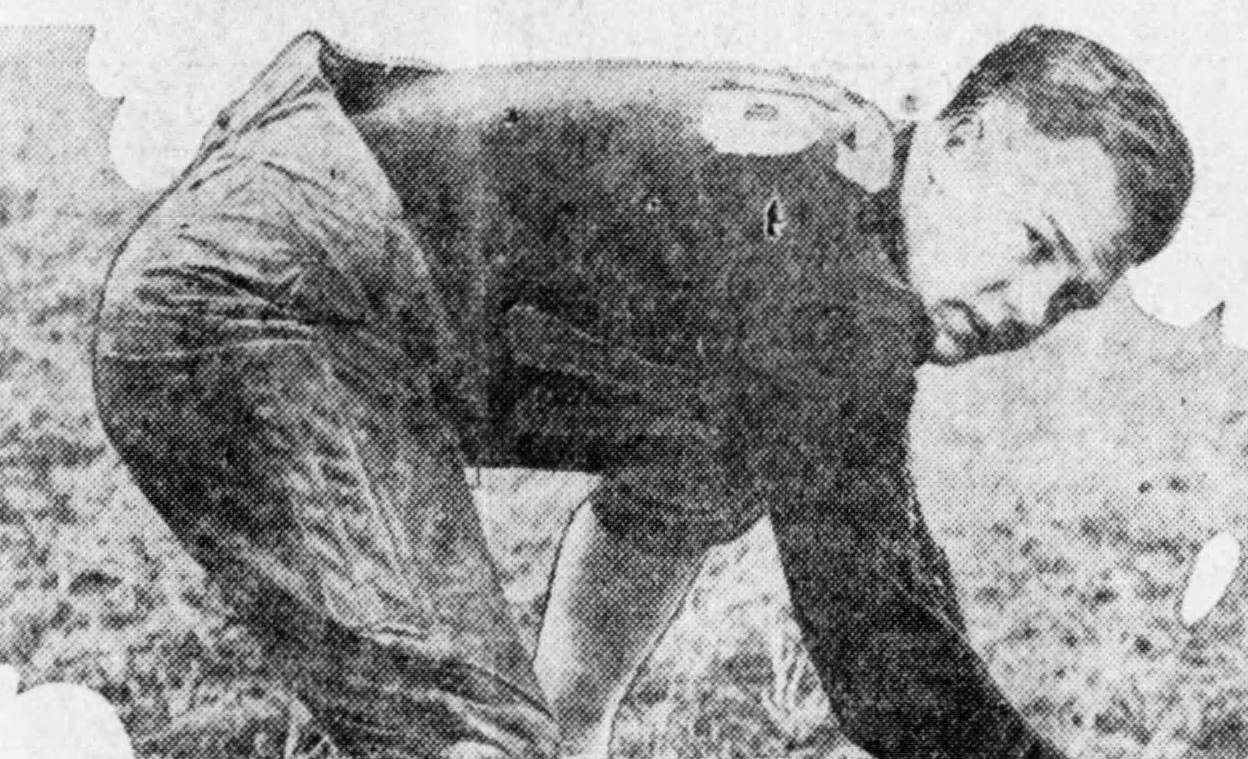
- Brown in 1928

Profile
- Position: Center

Personal information
- Born: May 27, 1907; Waverly, Iowa, U.S.
- Died: November 30, 1990 (aged 83); Milwaukee County, Wisconsin, U.S.
- Listed height: 6 ft 1 in (1.85 m)
- Listed weight: 220 lb (100 kg)

Career information
- High school: Cedar Rapids (IA)
- College: Iowa

Career history
- Portsmouth Spartans (1930)

Awards and highlights
- First-team All-Big Ten (1928)
- Stats at Pro Football Reference

Richard McClure Brown (May 27, 1907 – November 30, 1990) was an American football player.

Brown was born in 1907 in Waverly, Iowa. He attended Cedar Rapids High School.

He played college football for the Iowa Hawkeyes football team from 1926 to 1928. He was the captain of the 1928 Iowa team. He also played professional football in the National Football League (NFL) as a center for the Portsmouth Spartans in 1930. He appeared in 11 NFL games, eight as a starter.

Brown was married in 1931 to Gladys Beiber.
