= 1928 Indiana Hoosiers football team =

American college football season

1928 Indiana Hoosiers football
- Conference: Big Ten Conference
- Record: 4–4 (2–4 Big Ten)
- Head coach: Harlan Page (3rd season)
- MVP: Chuck Bennett
- Captains: Chuck Bennett; Robert Matthew
- Home stadium: Memorial Stadium

1928 Big Ten Conference football standings
	Conf.					Overall
Team	W		L		T	W		L		T
No. 6 Illinois $	4	–	1	–	0	7	–	1	–	0
No. 4 Wisconsin	3	–	1	–	1	7	–	1	–	1
Minnesota	4	–	2	–	0	6	–	2	–	0
No. 6 Iowa	3	–	2	–	0	6	–	2	–	0
Ohio State	3	–	2	–	0	5	–	2	–	1
Purdue	2	–	2	–	1	5	–	2	–	1
Northwestern	2	–	3	–	0	5	–	3	–	0
Michigan	2	–	3	–	0	3	–	4	–	1
Indiana	2	–	4	–	0	4	–	4	–	0
Chicago	0	–	5	–	0	2	–	7	–	0
$ – Conference champion; Rankings from Dickinson System

The 1928 Indiana Hoosiers football team represented the Indiana Hoosiers in the 1928 college football season as members of the Big Ten Conference. The Hoosiers played their home games at Memorial Stadium in Bloomington, Indiana. The team was coached by Harlan Page, in his third year as head coach.

== Schedule ==
Date	Opponent	Site	Result	Attendance	Source
September 29	Wabash*	Memorial Stadium; Bloomington, IN	W 14–0		
October 6	Oklahoma*	Memorial Stadium; Bloomington, IN	W 10–7		
October 13	at Michigan	Michigan Stadium; Ann Arbor, MI	W 6–0	25,896	
October 20	at Illinois	Memorial Stadium; Champaign, IL (rivalry)	L 7–13	26,683	
October 27	Ohio State	Memorial Stadium; Bloomington, IN	L 0–13	16,000	
November 10	at Minnesota	Memorial Stadium; Minneapolis, MN	L 12–21	25,000	
November 17	Northwestern	Memorial Stadium; Bloomington, IN	W 6–0		
November 24	at Purdue	Ross–Ade Stadium; West Lafayette, IN (Old Oaken Bucket)	L 0–14	25,000	
*Non-conference game
