= Otto Pommerening =

American football player (1904–1992)

Otto P. Pommerening
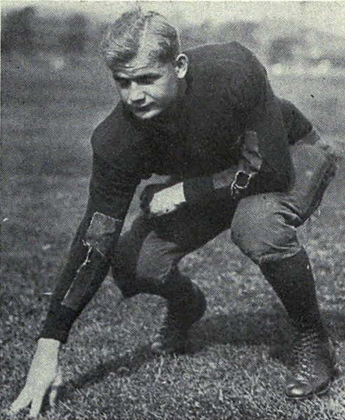
- Otto Pommerening, 1928 All-American

Profile
- Position: Tackle

Personal information
- Born: January 26, 1904; Ann Arbor, Michigan, U.S.
- Died: February 1, 1992 (aged 88); West Bloomfield, Michigan, U.S.
- Listed height: 5 ft 11 in (1.80 m)
- Listed weight: 178 lb (81 kg)

Career information
- College: Michigan (1928)

Awards and highlights
- Consensus All-American (1928); First-team All-Big Ten (1928)

Otto Paul Pommerening (January 26, 1904 – February 1, 1992) was an American football player. A native of Ann Arbor, Michigan, he played college football as a tackle for the University of Michigan Wolverines from 1927 to 1928. He was a consensus first-team All-American in 1928. He later worked as an engineer for the Wayne County Road Commission.

== Early life ==
Pommerening was born in Ann Arbor, Michigan, in 1904. He was the son of August Pommerening (1861-1947) and Mathilde (Wruck) Pommerening. His father was an immigrant from Germany and a construction worker.

== University of Michigan ==
Pommerening attended the University of Michigan. He played on the freshman football team in 1924 and the varsity football team from 1926 to 1928. During the 1928 season, Pommerening became the first player in the history of the Big Ten Conference to play every minute of every game for his team. One wire service report noted that he set the endurance record despite having suffered a severe head injury early in the season.

An Iowa newspaper credited Michigan's "big tackle" Pommerening as one of the players deserving credit in Michigan's 10-7 win over Iowa in 1928. The paper wrote that Pommerening "ripped wide holes in the Iowa line as Michigan started their winning drive."

Pommerening was a consensus first-team All-American for his play at tackle in 1928. In December 1928, the United Press named Pommerening to its All-American team at tackle, noting that Pommerening, "in a weak Michigan line stood out as the greatest in many a 'Big Ten' season." He was listed at 5 feet, 11 inches, and 178 pounds. Pommerening also finished fourth in the voting for the Chicago Tribune Silver Football trophy, awarded to the most valuable player in the Big Ten Conference. He also was selected as the most valuable player on the 1928 Michigan Wolverines football team and is regarded as one of the best linemen ever to play for the Michigan Wolverines.

Pommerening had hoped to play in 1929 but was ruled ineligible in November 1928 because he played five minutes in a game against Oklahoma A & M during his sophomore year.

== Family and later years ==
Pommerening appeared in the 1930 film "Maybe It's Love." The film, directed by William A. Wellman, was a genre football comedy starring Joan Bennett, Joe E. Brown, and members of the 1928 and 1929 All-American football teams and USC coach Howard Jones.

On May 8, 1932, Pommerening married Laura Mercer, a graduate nurse of Henry Ford Hospital in Detroit. At the time, Pommerening was employed as an engineer. In the fall of 1933, Pommerening played professional football and served as an assistant coach with the Detroit Indians. In 1936, he was reported to be working for Ford Motor Company in Detroit. He worked as an engineer for the Wayne County Road Commission for many years, retiring in 1966.

Pommerening and his wife had a son, David. Pommerening's wife, Laura, died in 1983. He died in 1992 at West Bloomfield, Michigan. He was a resident of Livonia, Michigan at the time of his death.

== See also ==
- List of Michigan Wolverines football All-Americans
