= Burt Ingwersen =

American athlete and coach (1898–1969)

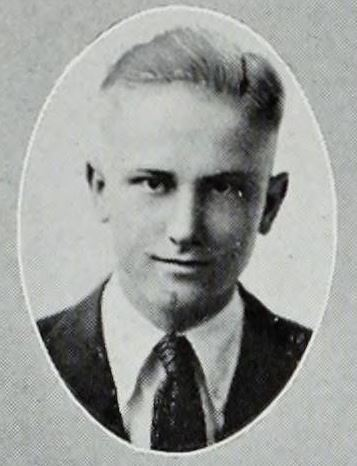
- The Illio, 1920

Biographical details
- Born: August 29, 1898; Bryant, Iowa, U.S.
- Died: July 15, 1969 (aged 70); Champaign, Illinois, U.S.

Playing career

Football
- 1917–1919: Illinois
- 1920: Decatur Staleys

Baseball
- 1918–1920: Illinois
- Position: Tackle (football)

Coaching career (HC unless noted)

Football
- 1921–1923: Illinois (assistant)
- 1924–1931: Iowa
- 1932–1944: LSU (assistant)
- 1935–1942: Northwestern (assistant)
- 1945–1966: Illinois (assistant)

Baseball
- 1936–1939: Northwestern

Head coaching record
- Overall: 33–27–4 (football); 35–51–1 (baseball)

Accomplishments and honors

Championships
- National (1919)

Awards
- Third-team All-Pro (1920); Second-team All-American (1919)

Burton Aherns Ingwersen (August 29, 1898 – July 15, 1969) was an American football, basketball, and baseball player and coach of football and baseball. He served as the head football coach at the University of Iowa from 1924 to 1931, compiling a career college football record of 33–27–4. Ingwersen played football, basketball, and baseball at the University of Illinois and was an assistant football coach at the school in two stints totaling 25 seasons. He also served as an assistant football coach at Northwestern University and was the head baseball coach there from 1936 to 1939, tallying a mark of 35–51–1.

== Early life and playing career ==
Ingwersen was born in Bryant, Iowa, a suburb of Clinton, but his parents and he moved across the river to Fulton, Illinois, when Ingwersen was in grade school. Since his high school in Fulton did not compete in football, Ingwersen played across the river at Clinton High School. Ingwersen accepted a scholarship offer from the University of Illinois. He was a member of Phi Kappa Psi. Ingwersen played for Bob Zuppke at Illinois from 1917 to 1919. During that time, the Illini won two Western Conference titles and the 1919 national championship. After graduating from Illinois, he played one year of professional football in the first year of the NFL for George Halas and the Decatur Staleys, later renamed the Chicago Staleys (1921) and Chicago Bears (1922).

== Coaching career ==
=== Assistant at Illinois ===
Ingwersen served as an assistant coach at Illinois under Bob Zuppke from 1921 to 1923, the team again winning the college national championship in 1923.

=== Head coach at Iowa ===
Coach Howard Jones left the University of Iowa for Trinity College, now known as Duke University, in 1923 after eight years that saw two unbeaten seasons, and a 42–17–1 overall record, though aside from the two undefeated years Jones never finished higher than fourth in the conference. Paul Belting succeeded Jones as Iowa's athletic director, and needing new coach to fill Jones's shoes, he nearly lured Knute Rockne from Notre Dame. Belting and Rockne had reached a deal in principle, but Rockne insisted that the media not be informed. When the Chicago Tribune ran a headline on March 23, 1924, speculating on Rockne's proposed move to Iowa, Rockne was quickly signed to a ten-year extension by Notre Dame.

Belting offered Ingwersen a three-year contract, making him the 12th coach in Iowa football history. Ingwersen's appointment was unanimously approved by the athletic board, although the selection was opposed by some Iowa alumni at the time. Critics had two complaints. The first was that Ingwersen was not a "name" coach; he had only been out of college for three years, and he did not have the credentials of Rockne. Second, Ingwersen was perceived as a "traitor" by some Hawkeyes who felt that despite growing up in Illinois he was a native-born Iowan who turned his back on the state to play and coach for the Illini.

Iowa finished with a 6–1–1 record in Ingwersen's first year as a head coach in 1924, better than Jones had managed the previous year. Unfortunately, the lone loss cost Iowa the Big Ten Conference title. Worse for some fans, the loss was to Zuppke and Illinois, Ingwersen's alma mater, the same school that had cost Iowa the championship in 1918 and 1919 while Ingwersen was a member of the Illini squad.

Iowa won the first five games of the 1925 season before losing their last three. The most notable win came in Iowa's third game against Illinois. Ledrue Galloway, a talented black tackle from the 1924 team, was fighting tuberculosis on his sickbed. Just before the 1925 game with Illinois, the Hawkeye team received a telegram from Galloway, stating, "There will be twelve Iowa men on the field to beat Illinois. I am with you." Things looked bleak at first, however, when Red Grange returned the opening kickoff 89 yards for a touchdown. But Iowa fought back and delivered a 12–10 victory for their teammate Galloway, who died less than a year later.

Iowa went 7–9 over the next two years, winning just one conference game in 1926 and 1927. Fan opposition to Ingwersen grew and sentiment turned on Ingwersen's biggest supporter, Paul Belting, as well.

Iowa was suspended from athletic participation in the Big Ten, effective January 1, 1930, in the wake of a recruiting scandal that stretched back to the Howard Jones era. After agreeing to suspend current players who had been paid from an alumni slush fund and to fire athletic director Belting, who was implicated in the scheme, Iowa was reinstated a month later.

The loss of his players greatly hampered Ingwersen's career at Iowa, and after going 1–6–1 in the 1931 season, scoring just seven points all year long, it was clear it would be a long time before Iowa would again be competitive within the conference. Ingwersen resigned after that season, stating that he "did not care to fight the critics who are now or will be asking for a new coach at Iowa."

Ingwersen had a 33–27–4 record at Iowa, with only had two losing seasons in the eight years he coached.

=== Later coaching career ===
In 1932 Ingwersen went to Louisiana State University as the number one assistant coach to Biff Jones, a lifelong friend. Ingwersen and Jones coached three years at LSU through the 1934 season.

In 1935 Ingwersen became an assistant football coach at Northwestern University under Pappy Waldorf. He coached there during through 1942 and served as Northwestern's baseball coach from 1936 to 1939 as well. In 1943 Ingwersen joined the U.S. Navy and served in World War II as athletic director for the Navy's North Carolina pre-flight school through June 1945.

After the war, Ingwersen again became an assistant coach at his alma mater, the University of Illinois, this time under Ray Eliot. He also coached as an assistant under Pete Elliott at Illinois, serving a total of 22 years in his second stint (1945–1966). Ingwersen died at age 70 on July 15, 1969, in Champaign, Illinois.

== Head coaching record ==
=== Football ===
Year	Team	Overall	Conference	Standing	Bowl/playoffs
Iowa Hawkeyes (Big Ten Conference) (1924–1931)
1924	Iowa	6–1–1	3–1–1	T–2nd	
1925	Iowa	5–3	2–2	T–4th	
1926	Iowa	3–5	0–5	T–9th	
1927	Iowa	4–4	1–4	T–9th	
1928	Iowa	6–2	3–2	T–4th	
1929	Iowa	4–2–2	2–2–2	5th	
1930	Iowa	4–4	0–1	T–9th	
1931	Iowa	1–6–1	0–3–1	9th	
Total:		33–27–4			
