= 1928 Northwestern Wildcats football team =

American college football season

1928 Northwestern Wildcats football
- Conference: Big Ten Conference
- Record: 5–3 (2–3 Big Ten)
- Head coach: Dick Hanley (2nd season)
- Captain: Walt Holmer
- Home stadium: Dyche Stadium

1928 Big Ten Conference football standings
	Conf.					Overall
Team	W		L		T	W		L		T
No. 6 Illinois $	4	–	1	–	0	7	–	1	–	0
No. 4 Wisconsin	3	–	1	–	1	7	–	1	–	1
Minnesota	4	–	2	–	0	6	–	2	–	0
No. 6 Iowa	3	–	2	–	0	6	–	2	–	0
Ohio State	3	–	2	–	0	5	–	2	–	1
Purdue	2	–	2	–	1	5	–	2	–	1
Northwestern	2	–	3	–	0	5	–	3	–	0
Michigan	2	–	3	–	0	3	–	4	–	1
Indiana	2	–	4	–	0	4	–	4	–	0
Chicago	0	–	5	–	0	2	–	7	–	0
$ – Conference champion; Rankings from Dickinson System

The 1928 Northwestern Wildcats team represented Northwestern University during the 1928 college football season. In their second year under head coach Dick Hanley, the Wildcats compiled a 5–3 record (2–3 against Big Ten Conference opponents) and finished in a tie for seventh place in the Big Ten Conference.

== Schedule ==
Date	Opponent	Site	Result	Attendance	Source
October 6	Butler*	Dyche Stadium; Evanston, IL	W 14–0		
October 13	Ohio State	Dyche Stadium; Evanston, IL	L 0–10	35,000	
October 20	Kentucky*	Dyche Stadium; Evanston, IL	W 7–0		
October 27	at Illinois	Memorial Stadium; Champaign, IL (rivalry)	L 0–6	59,871	
November 3	Minnesota	Dyche Stadium; Evanston, IL	W 10–9	45,000	
November 10	Purdue	Dyche Stadium; Evanston, IL	W 7–6	30,000	
November 17	at Indiana	Memorial Stadium; Bloomington, IN	L 0–6		
November 24	Dartmouth*	Dyche Stadium; Evanston, IL	W 27–6	45,000	
*Non-conference game
