= 1928 Chicago Maroons football team =

American college football season

1928 Chicago Maroons football
- Conference: Big Ten Conference
- Record: 2–7 (0–5 Big Ten)
- Head coach: Amos Alonzo Stagg (37th season)
- Captain: Saul Weislow
- Home stadium: Stagg Field

1928 Big Ten Conference football standings
	Conf.					Overall
Team	W		L		T	W		L		T
No. 6 Illinois $	4	–	1	–	0	7	–	1	–	0
No. 4 Wisconsin	3	–	1	–	1	7	–	1	–	1
Minnesota	4	–	2	–	0	6	–	2	–	0
No. 6 Iowa	3	–	2	–	0	6	–	2	–	0
Ohio State	3	–	2	–	0	5	–	2	–	1
Purdue	2	–	2	–	1	5	–	2	–	1
Northwestern	2	–	3	–	0	5	–	3	–	0
Michigan	2	–	3	–	0	3	–	4	–	1
Indiana	2	–	4	–	0	4	–	4	–	0
Chicago	0	–	5	–	0	2	–	7	–	0
$ – Conference champion; Rankings from Dickinson System

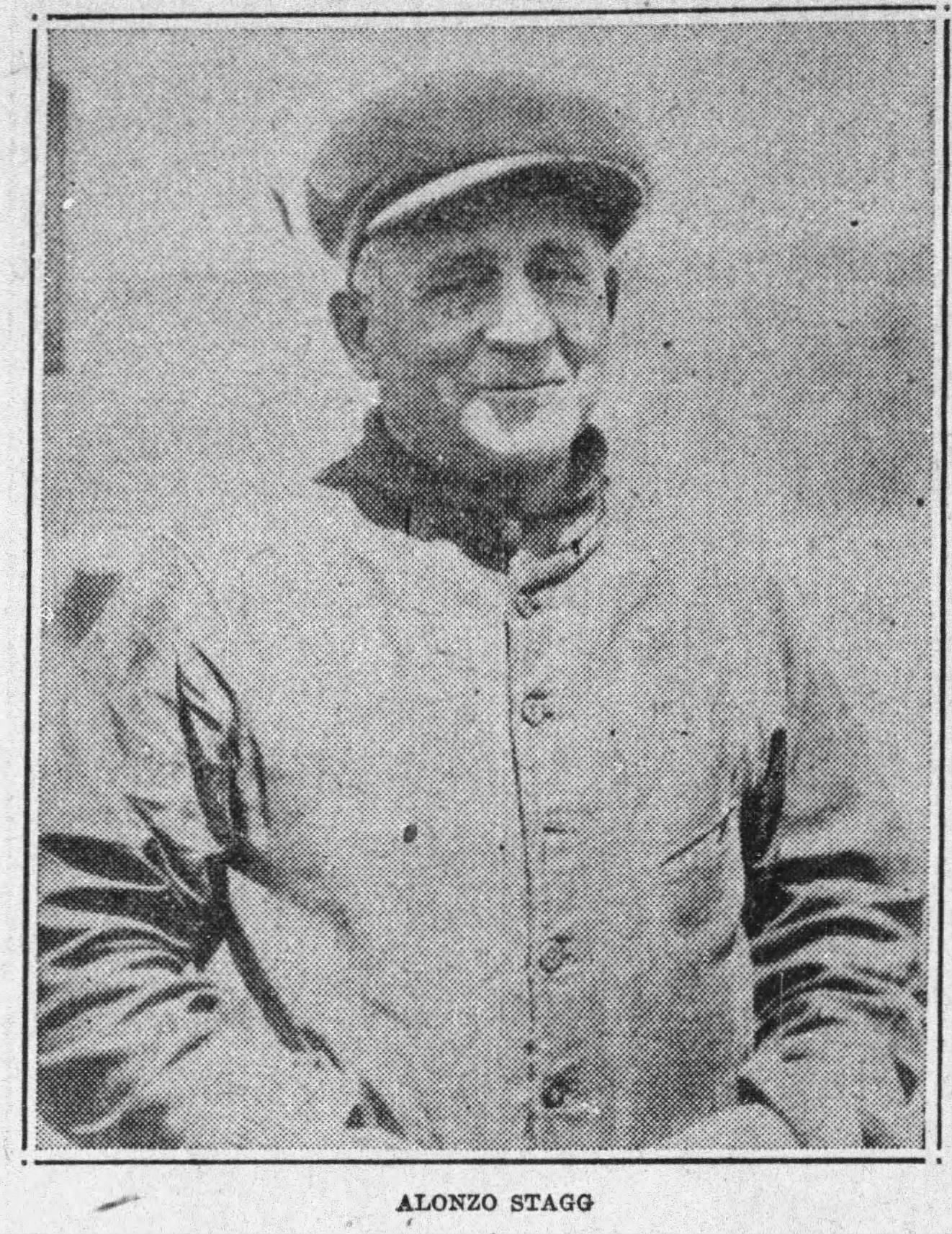
Stagg in 1928

The 1928 Chicago Maroons football team was an American football team that represented the University of Chicago during the 1928 college football season. In their 37th season under head coach Amos Alonzo Stagg, the Maroons compiled a 2–7 record, finished last in the Big Ten Conference, and were outscored by their opponents by a combined total of 177 to 70.

Fritz Crisler was an assistant coach on the team.

== Schedule ==
Date	Time	Opponent	Site	Result	Attendance	Source
September 29		South Carolina*	Stagg Field; Chicago, IL	L 0–6		
October 6	2:00 p.m.	Wyoming*	Stagg Field; Chicago, IL	W 47–0	30,000	
October 6		Lake Forest*	Stagg Field; Chicago, IL	W 3–0	30,000	
October 13		Iowa	Stagg Field; Chicago, IL	L 0–13		
October 20		at Minnesota	Memorial Stadium; Minneapolis, MN	L 7–33	58,000	
October 27		Purdue	Stagg Field; Chicago, IL (rivalry)	L 0–40	35,000	
November 3		Penn*	Stagg Field; Chicago, IL	L 13–20		
November 10		at Wisconsin	Camp Randall Stadium; Madison, WI	L 0–25		
November 17		Illinois	Stagg Field; Chicago, IL	L 0–40	48,714	
*Non-conference game; All times are in Central time
