= 1928 Purdue Boilermakers football team =

American college football season

1928 Purdue Boilermakers football
- Conference: Big Ten Conference
- Record: 5–2–1 (2–2–1 Big Ten)
- Head coach: James Phelan (7th season)
- Captain: Harvey S. Olson
- Home stadium: Ross–Ade Stadium

1928 Big Ten Conference football standings
	Conf.					Overall
Team	W		L		T	W		L		T
No. 6 Illinois $	4	–	1	–	0	7	–	1	–	0
No. 4 Wisconsin	3	–	1	–	1	7	–	1	–	1
Minnesota	4	–	2	–	0	6	–	2	–	0
No. 6 Iowa	3	–	2	–	0	6	–	2	–	0
Ohio State	3	–	2	–	0	5	–	2	–	1
Purdue	2	–	2	–	1	5	–	2	–	1
Northwestern	2	–	3	–	0	5	–	3	–	0
Michigan	2	–	3	–	0	3	–	4	–	1
Indiana	2	–	4	–	0	4	–	4	–	0
Chicago	0	–	5	–	0	2	–	7	–	0
$ – Conference champion; Rankings from Dickinson System

The 1928 Purdue Boilermakers football team was an American football team that represented Purdue University during the 1928 college football season. In their seventh season under head coach James Phelan, the Boilermakers compiled a 5–2–1 record, finished in sixth place in the Big Ten Conference with a 2–2–1 record against conference opponents, and outscored opponents by a total of 143 to 41. Harvey S. Olson was the team captain.

== Schedule ==
Date	Opponent	Site	Result	Attendance	Source
October 6	DePauw*	Ross–Ade Stadium; West Lafayette, IN	W 31–0		
October 13	at Minnesota	Memorial Stadium; Minneapolis, MN	L 0–15	25,000	
October 20	Wisconsin^{†}	Ross–Ade Stadium; West Lafayette, IN	T 19–19	15,000	
October 27	at Chicago	Stagg Field; Chicago, IL (rivalry)	W 40–0	35,000	
November 3	Case*	Ross–Ade Stadium; West Lafayette, IN	W 19–0		
November 10	at Northwestern	Dyche Stadium; Evanston, IL	L 6–7	30,000	
November 17	Wabash*	Ross–Ade Stadium; West Lafayette, IN	W 14–0		
November 24	Indiana	Ross–Ade Stadium; West Lafayette, IN (Old Oaken Bucket)	W 14–0	25,000	
*Non-conference game; ^{†}Homecoming

== Roster ==
- Horace Buttner, T-G
- Don Cameron, T
- Elbert Caraway, HB
- Hal Chasey, HB
- Joe Dellinger, T
- Burt Dreyer, C
- Fred Eibel, E
- Edwin Eickmann, T
- Herb Galletch, T
- Sigmund Greicus, G
- Al Guthrie, HB
- Glen Harmeson, QB
- A. F. Hook, G
- Leon Hutton, E
- Red Mackey, E
- William Mackle, E
- William Miller, FB
- Harvey Olson, C
- Andrew Papp, FB
- Jonathan Schwartz, HB-QB
- Elmer Sleight, T
- George Stears, G
- George Van Bibber, T
- Ralph Welch, HB
- Bill Woerner, E
