= George Gibson (American football) =

American football player and coach (1905–2004)

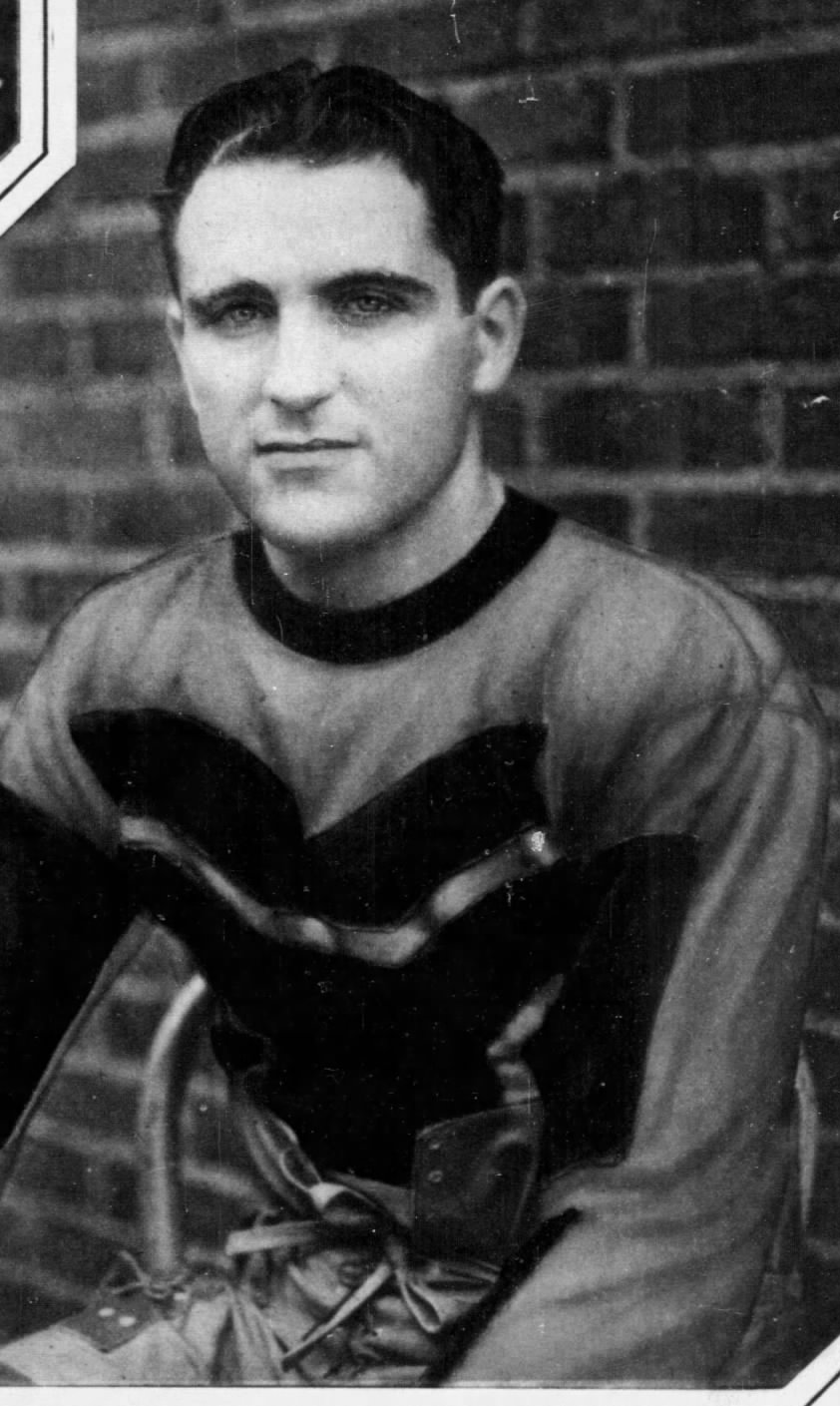
- Gibson in 1928

Profile
- Position: Guard

Personal information
- Born: October 2, 1905; Kendaia, New York, U.S.
- Died: August 19, 2004 (aged 98); Midland, Texas, U.S.

Career information
- College: Minnesota

Career history

Playing
- 1930: Minneapolis Red Jackets
- 1930: Frankford Yellow Jackets

Coaching
- 1930: Minneapolis Red Jackets
- 1930: Frankford Yellow Jackets
- 1934–1938: Carleton

Awards and highlights
- First-team All-American (1928); First-team All-Big Ten (1928); Second-team All-Big Ten (1927)
- Coaching profile at Pro Football Reference
- Stats at Pro Football Reference

George Randall Gibson (October 2, 1905 – August 19, 2004) was an American football player and coach. He played college football as a guard at the University of Minnesota from 1926 to 1928. He was captain of the 1928 Minnesota Golden Gophers football team and was named to the 1928 College Football All-America Team. Gibson was a teammate and roommate of Bronko Nagurski. The two are jointly honored as the namesakes of the Minnesota Golden Gophers football training complex, the Gibson-Nagurski Football Complex. While at the University of Minnesota, Gibson was a member of Sigma Chi fraternity. Gibson later worked as an assistant coach at Minnesota.

Gibson was one of eleven All-American football players to appear in the 1930 film Maybe It's Love.

Gibson was a professional player and coach in the early National Football League (NFL). In 1930, Gibson joined the Minneapolis Red Jackets as a player-coach. Later that season, he moved to the Frankford Yellow Jackets. His career NFL coaching record was 3–10–1.

Gibson later coached the line at Carleton College and signed a contract to play with the Green Bay Packers but did not play. Instead, he chose to earn his Ph.D. in geology from the University of Minnesota and became a geology professor at Carleton College, where he also coached the football team from 1934 to 1938. In 1936, Carleton went 6–1 with the only loss coming to Iowa. His coaching record at Carleton was 21–13–2.

In 1938, Gibson worked as a geologist for the Socony-Vacuum Oil Company in Egypt. In 1941, he took a job as a geologist for the Magnolia Petroleum Company and moved to Midland, Texas. He later worked as a geologist for the Richfield Oil Company and for the Seaboard Oil Corporation. In 1952, he started his own consulting business and worked as a geologic consultant in the Philippines, New Zealand, Turkey, Egypt, South Africa, and Lesotho, as well as in the United States. He was inducted into the Petroleum Museum Hall of Fame in 2001.

Gibson died at his home in Midland, Texas on August 19, 2004, at the age of 98.

== Head coaching record ==
=== College ===
Year	Team	Overall	Conference	Standing	Bowl/playoffs
Carleton Carls (Midwest Conference) (1934–1938)
1934	Carleton	6–1	3–1	3rd	
1935	Carleton	3–2–2	1–1–1	T–5th	
1936	Carleton	6–1	3–0	T–1st	
1937	Carleton	5–3	3–2	3rd	
1938	Carleton	1–6–1	0–2–1	T–6th	
Carleton:		21–13–3	10–6–2		
Total:		21–13–3			
National championship Conference title Conference division title or championship game berth
