= 1928 Ohio State Buckeyes football team =

American college football season

1928 Ohio State Buckeyes football
- Conference: Big Ten Conference
- Record: 5–2–1 (3–2 Big Ten)
- Head coach: John Wilce (16th season)
- Home stadium: Ohio Stadium

Uniform
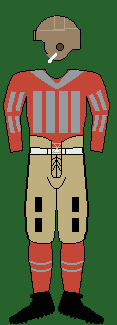

1928 Big Ten Conference football standings
	Conf.					Overall
Team	W		L		T	W		L		T
No. 6 Illinois $	4	–	1	–	0	7	–	1	–	0
No. 4 Wisconsin	3	–	1	–	1	7	–	1	–	1
Minnesota	4	–	2	–	0	6	–	2	–	0
No. 6 Iowa	3	–	2	–	0	6	–	2	–	0
Ohio State	3	–	2	–	0	5	–	2	–	1
Purdue	2	–	2	–	1	5	–	2	–	1
Northwestern	2	–	3	–	0	5	–	3	–	0
Michigan	2	–	3	–	0	3	–	4	–	1
Indiana	2	–	4	–	0	4	–	4	–	0
Chicago	0	–	5	–	0	2	–	7	–	0
$ – Conference champion; Rankings from Dickinson System

The 1928 Ohio State Buckeyes football team represented Ohio State University as a member of the Big Ten Conference duiring the 1928 college football season. The Buckeyes compiled a 5–2–1 record and got their first win over Michigan in six seasons. The Buckeyes outscored their opponents 135–35. It was John Wilce's last season as head coach. He finished his tenure at Ohio State with a 78–33–9 record and 4–7 against Michigan with three Big Ten Conference titles.

== Schedule ==
Date	Opponent	Site	Result	Attendance	Source
October 6	Wittenberg*	Ohio Stadium; Columbus, OH	W 41–0	30,286	
October 13	at Northwestern	Dyche Stadium; Evanston, IL	W 10–0	35,000	
October 20	Michigan	Ohio Stadium; Columbus, OH (rivalry)	W 19–7	72,439	
October 27	at Indiana	Memorial Stadium; Bloomington, IN	W 13–0	16,000	
November 3	Princeton*	Ohio Stadium; Columbus, OH	T 6–6	72,496	
November 10	Iowa	Ohio Stadium; Columbus, OH	L 7–14	47,000	
November 17	Muskingum*	Ohio Stadium; Columbus, OH	W 39–0	10,035	
November 24	at Illinois	Memorial Stadium; Champaign, IL (Illibuck)	L 0–8	35,712	
*Non-conference game

== Coaching staff ==
- John Wilce, head coach, 16th year
- Tarzan Taylor, line coach, 1st year
