= Dick Hanley (American football) =

American football player and coach (1894–1970)

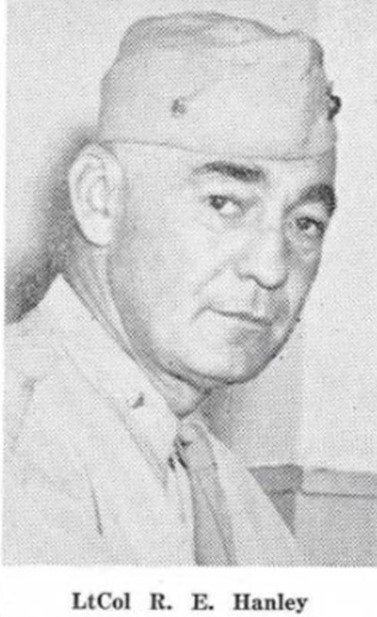
- Hanley while serving in the Marine Corps, 1946

Biographical details
- Born: November 19, 1894; Cloquet, Minnesota, U.S.
- Died: December 16, 1970 (aged 76); Palo Alto, California, U.S.

Playing career
- 1915–1917: Washington State
- 1918: Marine Island Marines
- 1920: Washington State
- 1924: Racine Legion
- Positions: Halfback, quarterback

Coaching career (HC unless noted)
- 1920–1921: Pendleton HS (OR)
- 1922–1926: Haskell
- 1927–1934: Northwestern
- 1944–1945: El Toro Marines
- 1946: Chicago Rockets

Head coaching record
- Overall: 99–36–8 (college); 1–1–1 (AAFC)

Accomplishments and honors

Championships
- 2 Big Ten (1930–1931) Rose Bowl (1916)

Richard Edgar Hanley (November 19, 1894 – December 16, 1970) was an American football player and coach. Hanley played quarterback at Washington State College from 1915 to 1917 and again in 1920. During his four years at Washington State, their record was 22–4–1, including a victory in the 1916 Rose Bowl over Brown. Hanley is notable for being one of the few players to have played in the Rose Bowl for two different teams. In 1918, he enlisted in the United States Marine Corps becoming a player and captain for the Marine Island Marines.

Hanley served as the head football coach at Haskell Institute—now known as Haskell Indian Nations University—from 1922 to 1926 and at Northwestern University from 1927 to 1934. Hanley reentered the Marine Corps in 1942 and was assigned to Marine Corps Air Station El Toro in California and tasked with devising a combat conditioning program for the Marines training at the air station. While at EL Toro, he also coached the base's football team during the 1944 and 1945 seasons. Those "Flying Marine" teams went a combined 16–3 during his tenure. He left the Marine Corps as a lieutenant colonel in March 1946. In 1946, he coached the first three games of the season for the Chicago Rockets of the All-America Football Conference (AAFC).

Hanley died on December 16, 1970, at Stanford University Hospital in Palo Alto, California.

== Head coaching record ==
=== College ===
Year	Team	Overall	Conference	Standing	Bowl/playoffs	AP^{#}
Haskell Indians (Independent) (1922–1926)
1922	Haskell	8–2				
1923	Haskell	11–2–1				
1924	Haskell	7–2–1				
1925	Haskell	9–3–1				
1926	Haskell	12–0–1				
Haskell:		47–9–4				
Northwestern Wildcats (Big Ten Conference) (1927–1934)
1927	Northwestern	4–4	2–3	T–6th		
1928	Northwestern	5–3	2–3	T–7th		
1929	Northwestern	6–3	3–2	T–3rd		
1930	Northwestern	7–1	5–0	T–1st		
1931	Northwestern	7–1–1	5–1	T–1st		
1932	Northwestern	3–4–1	2–3–1	5th		
1933	Northwestern	1–5–2	1–4–1	7th		
1934	Northwestern	3–5	2–3	T–5th		
Northwestern:		36–26–4	22–19–2			
El Toro Flying Marines (Independent) (1944–1945)
1944	El Toro Marines	8–1				16
1945	El Toro Marines	8–2				
El Toro Marines:		16–3				
Total:		99–36–8				
National championship Conference title Conference division title or championship game berth
