= 1928 Minnesota Golden Gophers football team =

American college football season

1928 Minnesota Golden Gophers football
- Conference: Big Ten Conference
- Record: 6–2 (4–2 Big Ten)
- Head coach: Clarence Spears (4th season)
- Captain: George Gibson
- Home stadium: Memorial Stadium

1928 Big Ten Conference football standings
	Conf.					Overall
Team	W		L		T	W		L		T
No. 6 Illinois $	4	–	1	–	0	7	–	1	–	0
No. 4 Wisconsin	3	–	1	–	1	7	–	1	–	1
Minnesota	4	–	2	–	0	6	–	2	–	0
No. 6 Iowa	3	–	2	–	0	6	–	2	–	0
Ohio State	3	–	2	–	0	5	–	2	–	1
Purdue	2	–	2	–	1	5	–	2	–	1
Northwestern	2	–	3	–	0	5	–	3	–	0
Michigan	2	–	3	–	0	3	–	4	–	1
Indiana	2	–	4	–	0	4	–	4	–	0
Chicago	0	–	5	–	0	2	–	7	–	0
$ – Conference champion; Rankings from Dickinson System

The 1928 Minnesota Golden Gophers football team represented the University of Minnesota in the 1928 college football season. In their fourth year under head coach Clarence Spears, the Golden Gophers compiled a 6–2 record and outscored their opponents by a combined score of 182 to 36.

Guard George Gibson and end Ken Haycraft were named All-Americans by the Associated Press and Look Magazine. Gibson, Haycraft and quarterback Fred Hovde were named All-Big Ten first team.

Total attendance for the season was 146,185, which averaged to 29,237. The season high for attendance was against Chicago.

== Schedule ==
Date	Opponent	Site	Result	Attendance
October 6	Creighton*	Memorial Stadium; Minneapolis, MN	W 40–0	20,000
October 13	Purdue	Memorial Stadium; Minneapolis, MN	W 15–0	25,000
October 20	Chicago^{†}	Memorial Stadium; Minneapolis, MN	W 33–7	58,000
October 27	at Iowa	Iowa Field; Iowa City, IA (rivalry)	L 6–7	30,000
November 3	at Northwestern	Dyche Stadium; Evanston, IL	L 9–10	45,000
November 10	Indiana	Memorial Stadium; Minneapolis, MN	W 21–12	25,000
November 17	Haskell*	Memorial Stadium; Minneapolis, MN	W 52–0	20,000
November 24	at Wisconsin	Camp Randall Stadium; Madison, WI (rivalry)	W 6–0	10,000
*Non-conference game; ^{†}Homecoming
