= 1928 All-Big Ten Conference football team =

American college football all-star team

The 1928 All-Big Ten Conference football team consists of American football players selected to the All-Big Ten Conference teams chosen by various selectors for the 1928 Big Ten Conference football season.

== All Big-Ten selections ==
=== Ends ===
- Wes Fesler, Ohio State (AP-1; UP-1; WE-1)
- Ken Haycraft, Minnesota (AP-1; UP-1; WE-1)
- Bob Tanner, Minnesota (AP-2; WE-2)
- Jack Hutton, Purdue (AP-2; WE-2)

=== Tackles ===
- Otto Pommerening, Michigan (AP-1; UP-1; WE-1 [guard])
- Butch Nowack, Illinois (AP-1; UP-1; WE-1)
- Vincent Schleusner, Iowa (AP-2; WE-2)
- Leo Raskowski, Ohio State (AP-2; WE-2)

=== Guards ===
- Rube Wagner, Wisconsin (AP-1; UP-1; WE-1 [tackle])
- George Gibson, Minnesota (AP-1; UP-1; WE-1)
- Peter Westra, Iowa (AP-2)
- Joe Kresky, Wisconsin (AP-2)
- Russ Crane, Illinois (WE-2)
- John Parks, Wisconsin (WE-2)

=== Centers ===
- Clare Randolph, Indiana (AP-1; UP-1; WE-2)
- Richard Brown, Iowa (AP-2; WE-1)

=== Quarterbacks ===
- Frederick L. Hovde, Minnesota (AP-1; UP-1; WE-1)
- Frank Cuisinier, Wisconsin (AP-2; WE-2)

=== Halfbacks ===
- Chuck Bennett, Indiana (AP-1; UP-1; WE-1)
- Willis Glassgow, Iowa (AP-1; UP-1; WE-2)
- Ralph Welch, Purdue (AP-2; WE-1)
- Bill Lusby, Wisconsin (AP-2)
- Hank Bruder, Northwestern (WE-2)

=== Fullbacks ===
- Walt Holmer, Northwestern (AP-1; UP-1; WE-1)
- Mayes McLain, Iowa (AP-2; WE-2)

== Key ==
AP = Associated Press

UP = United Press

WE = Walter Eckersall

Bold = Consensus first-team selections of at least two of the listed selectors (AP, UP and Eckersall)

== See also ==
- 1928 College Football All-America Team
