= Robert Zuppke =

American football coach (1879–1957)

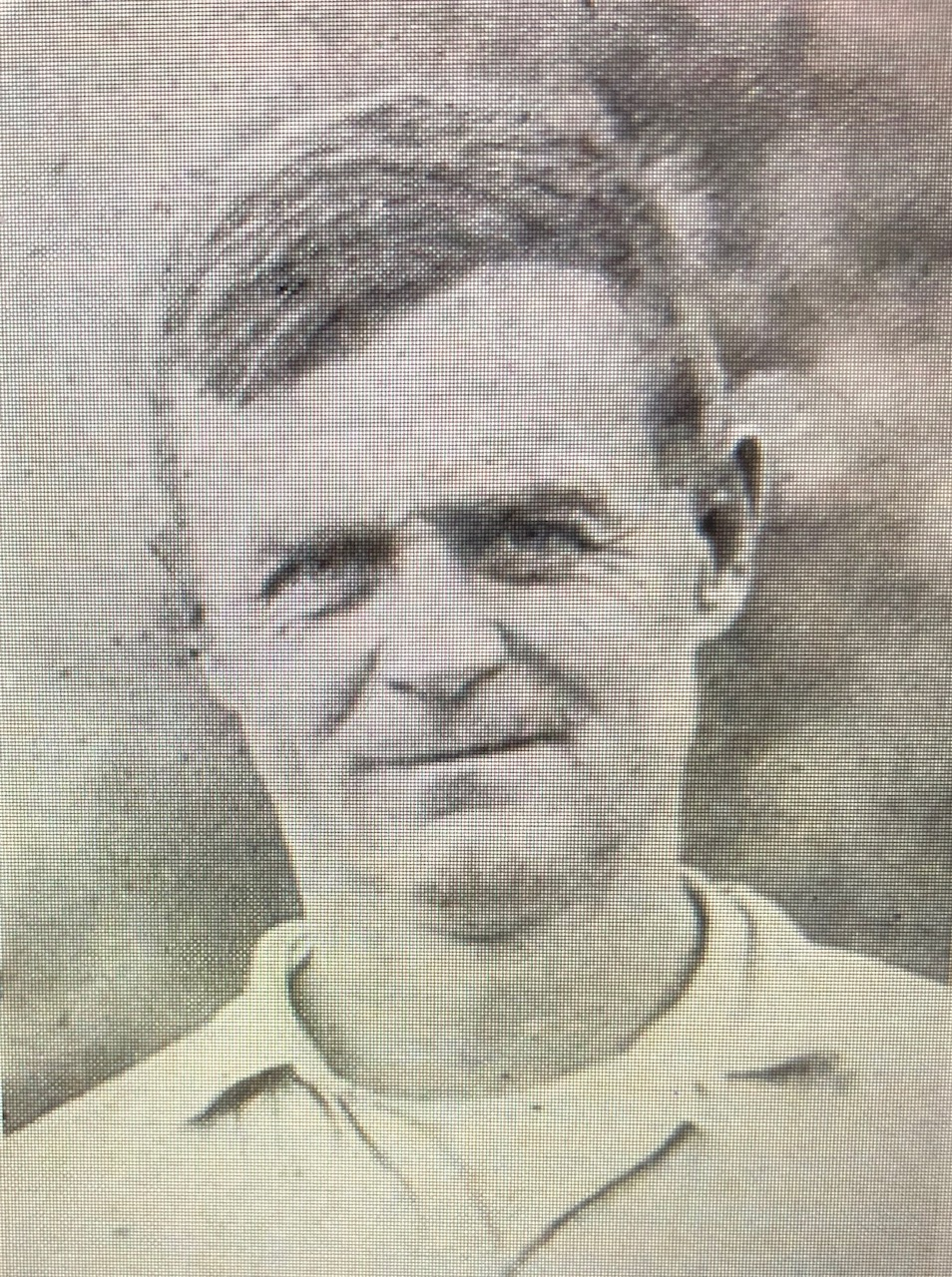
- Zuppke at Illinois, c. 1922

Biographical details
- Born: July 2, 1879; Berlin, Germany
- Died: December 22, 1957 (aged 78); Champaign, Illinois, U.S.

Playing career

Football
- c. 1900: Milwaukee Normal

Basketball
- 1903–1905: Wisconsin

Coaching career (HC unless noted)

Football
- 1906–1909: Hackley Manual Training (MI)
- 1910–1912: Oak Park and River Forest HS (IL)
- 1913–1941: Illinois

Head coaching record
- Overall: 131–81–12 (college)

Accomplishments and honors

Championships
- 4 national (1914, 1919, 1923, 1927); 7 Western / Big Ten (1914–1915, 1918–1919, 1923, 1927–1928)

Awards
- Amos Alonzo Stagg Award (1948)
- College Football Hall of Fame; Inducted in 1951 (profile)

Robert Carl Zuppke (July 2, 1879 – December 22, 1957) was an American football coach. He served as the head football coach at the University of Illinois—now known as the University of Illinois Urbana-Champaign–from 1913 until 1941, compiling a record of 131–81–12. Inducted into the College Football Hall of Fame in 1951, Zuppke coached his teams to national titles in 1914, 1919, 1923, and 1927. Zuppke's teams also won seven Big Ten Conference championships.

Among the players Zuppke coached at Illinois was Red Grange, the era's most celebrated college football player. The field at the University of Illinois's Gies Memorial Stadium is named Zuppke Field in his honor. Zuppke is credited for many football inventions and traditions, including the huddle and the flea flicker. In 1914, he reintroduced the I formation.

Prior to coaching at the University of Illinois, Zuppke coached at Muskegon High School in Muskegon, Michigan, and Oak Park and River Forest High School in Oak Park, Illinois, where he tutored future Pro Football Hall of Famer George Trafton and Olympic decathlete Harry Goelitz. Zuppke led the team to state championships in 1911 and 1912. He had several coaching influences. He used some plays developed by Pop Warner.

Zuppke also was a writer and a fine art painter. From 1930 to 1948, Zuppke wrote the syndicated newspaper strip Ned Brant, drawn by Walt Depew. During the 1930s, Zuppke also wrote syndicated sports-related columns. As a painter, Zuppke was known for his rugged Western landscapes.

== Zuppkeisms ==
Zuppke was given to philosophical remarks, known as "Zuppkeisms." The seven best-known are as follows:

1. Never let hope elude you; that is life's biggest failure
2. The greatest athlete is one who can carry a nimble brain to the place of action
3. Moral courage is the result of respect from fellow men
4. A good back should keep his feet at all times and never lose his head
5. Men do their best if they know they are being observed
6. Alumni are loyal if a coach wins all his games
7. Advice to freshmen: don't drink the liniment

== Artist ==
Zuppke was also a painter who worked mainly on creating evocative, naturalistic landscapes depicting the American Southwest. Zuppke saw no conflict between his interest in painting and football strategy as he believed, "Art and football are very much alike". His work was displayed in several shows, including a one-man show at the Palmer House in Chicago in 1937. Zuppke was a member of the No-Jury Society of Artists in Chicago and an acquaintance of Ernest Hemingway. Images of Zuppke alongside some of his paintings can be found in the University of Illinois Archives.

== Head coaching record ==
=== College ===
Year	Team	Overall	Conference	Standing	Bowl/playoffs
Illinois Fighting Illini (Western Conference / Big Ten Conference) (1913–1941)
1913	Illinois	4–2–1	2–2–1	5th	
1914	Illinois	7–0	6–0	1st	
1915	Illinois	5–0–2	3–0–2	T–1st	
1916	Illinois	3–3–1	2–2–1	T–4th	
1917	Illinois	5–2–1	2–2–1	T–5th	
1918	Illinois	5–2	4–0	T–1st	
1919	Illinois	6–1	6–1	1st	
1920	Illinois	5–2	4–2	4th	
1921	Illinois	3–4	1–4	T–8th	
1922	Illinois	2–5	2–4	6th	
1923	Illinois	8–0	5–0	T–1st	
1924	Illinois	6–1–1	3–1–1	T–2nd	
1925	Illinois	5–3	2–2	T–4th	
1926	Illinois	6–2	2–2	T–6th	
1927	Illinois	7–0–1	5–0	1st	
1928	Illinois	7–1	4–1	1st	
1929	Illinois	6–1–1	3–1–1	2nd	
1930	Illinois	3–5	1–4	8th	
1931	Illinois	2–6	0–6	10th	
1932	Illinois	5–4	2–4	7th	
1933	Illinois	5–3	3–2	T–5th	
1934	Illinois	7–1	4–1	3rd	
1935	Illinois	3–5	1–4	T–9th	
1936	Illinois	4–3–1	2–2–1	6th	
1937	Illinois	3–3–2	2–3	8th	
1938	Illinois	3–5	2–3	7th	
1939	Illinois	3–4–1	3–3	6th	
1940	Illinois	1–7	0–5	9th	
1941	Illinois	2–6	0–5	9th	
Illinois:		131–81–12	76–66–8		
Total:		131–81–12			
National championship Conference title Conference division title or championship game berth

== See also ==
- List of presidents of the American Football Coaches Association

== Sources ==
- Brichford, Maynard (2009). Bob Zuppke: The Life and Football Legacy of the Illinois Coach. Jefferson, North Carolina: McFarland & Co.
