= List of Big Ten Conference football champions =

This is a list of yearly Big Ten Conference football champions. Co-champions are listed in alphabetical order.

== Champions by year ==
		Record		Ranking			
Year	Champions	Conference	Overall	AP	Coaches	Bowl result	Head coach
1896	Wisconsin	2–0–1	7–1–1	Started in 1936	Started in 1950	–	Philip King
1897	Wisconsin	3–0	9–1	Started in 1936	Started in 1950	–	Philip King
1898	Michigan	3–0	10–0	Started in 1936	Started in 1950	–	Gustave Ferbert
1899	Chicago	4–0	16–0–2	Started in 1936	Started in 1950	–	Amos Alonzo Stagg
1900	Iowa	2–0–1	7–0–1	Started in 1936	Started in 1950	–	Alden Knipe
1900	Minnesota	3–0–1	10–0–2	Started in 1936	Started in 1950	–	Henry L. Williams
1901	Michigan*	4–0	11–0	Started in 1936	Started in 1950	W Rose Bowl 49–0 vs. Stanford	Fielding H. Yost
1901	Wisconsin	2–0	9–0	Started in 1936	Started in 1950	–	Philip King
1902	Michigan*	5–0	11–0	Started in 1936	Started in 1950	–	Fielding H. Yost
1903	Michigan*	3–0–1	11–0–1	Started in 1936	Started in 1950	–	Fielding H. Yost
1903	Minnesota	3–0–1	14–0–1	Started in 1936	Started in 1950	–	Henry L. Williams
1903	Northwestern	1–0–2	10–1–3	Started in 1936	Started in 1950	–	Walter McCornack
1904	Michigan*	2–0	10–0	Started in 1936	Started in 1950	–	Fielding H. Yost
1904	Minnesota*	3–0	13–0	Started in 1936	Started in 1950	–	Henry L. Williams
1905	Chicago*	7–0	11–0	Started in 1936	Started in 1950	–	Amos Alonzo Stagg
1906	Michigan	1–0	4–1	Started in 1936	Started in 1950	–	Fielding H. Yost
1906	Minnesota	2–0	4–1	Started in 1936	Started in 1950	–	Henry L. Williams
1906	Wisconsin	3–0	5–0	Started in 1936	Started in 1950	–	Charles P. Hutchins
1907	Chicago	4–0	4–1	Started in 1936	Started in 1950	–	Amos Alonzo Stagg
1908	Chicago	5–0	5–0–1	Started in 1936	Started in 1950	–	Amos Alonzo Stagg
1909	Minnesota	3–0	6–1	Started in 1936	Started in 1950	–	Henry L. Williams
1910	Illinois	4–0	7–0	Started in 1936	Started in 1950	–	Arthur Hall
1910	Minnesota	2–0	6–1	Started in 1936	Started in 1950	–	Henry L. Williams
1911	Minnesota	3–0–1	6–0–1	Started in 1936	Started in 1950	–	Henry L. Williams
1912	Wisconsin	5–0	7–0	Started in 1936	Started in 1950	–	William Juneau
1913	Chicago	7–0	7–0	Started in 1936	Started in 1950	–	Amos Alonzo Stagg
1914	Illinois*	6–0	7–0	Started in 1936	Started in 1950	–	Robert Zuppke
1915	Illinois	3–0–2	5–0–2	Started in 1936	Started in 1950	–	Robert Zuppke
1915	Minnesota	3–0–1	6–0–1	Started in 1936	Started in 1950	–	Henry L. Williams
1916	Ohio State	4–0	7–0	Started in 1936	Started in 1950	–	John Wilce
1917	Ohio State	4–0	8–0–1	Started in 1936	Started in 1950	–	John Wilce
1918	Illinois	4–0	5–2	Started in 1936	Started in 1950	–	Robert Zuppke
1918	Michigan*	2–0	5–0	Started in 1936	Started in 1950	–	Fielding H. Yost
1918	Purdue	1–0	3–3	Started in 1936	Started in 1950	–	A. G. Scanlon
1919	Illinois*	6–1	6–1	Started in 1936	Started in 1950	–	Robert Zuppke
1920	Ohio State	5–0	7–1	Started in 1936	Started in 1950	L Rose Bowl 0–28 vs. California	John Wilce
1921	Iowa	5–0	7–0	Started in 1936	Started in 1950	–	Howard Jones
1922	Chicago	4–0–1	5–1–1	Started in 1936	Started in 1950	–	Amos Alonzo Stagg
1922	Iowa	5–0	7–0	Started in 1936	Started in 1950	–	Howard Jones
1922	Michigan	4–0	6–0–1	Started in 1936	Started in 1950	–	Fielding H. Yost
1923	Illinois*	5–0	8–0	Started in 1936	Started in 1950	–	Robert Zuppke
1923	Michigan*	4–0	8–0	Started in 1936	Started in 1950	–	Fielding H. Yost
1924	Chicago	3–0–3	4–1–3	Started in 1936	Started in 1950	–	Amos Alonzo Stagg
1925	Michigan	5–1	7–1	Started in 1936	Started in 1950	–	Fielding H. Yost
1926	Michigan	5–0	7–1	Started in 1936	Started in 1950	–	Fielding H. Yost
1926	Northwestern	5–0	7–1	Started in 1936	Started in 1950	–	Glenn Thistlethwaite
1927	Illinois*	5–0	7–0–1	Started in 1936	Started in 1950	–	Robert Zuppke
1927	Minnesota	3–0–1	6–0–2	Started in 1936	Started in 1950	–	Clarence Spears
1928	Illinois	4–1	7–1	Started in 1936	Started in 1950	–	Robert Zuppke
1929	Purdue	5–0	8–0	Started in 1936	Started in 1950	–	James Phelan
1930	Michigan	5–0	8–0–1	Started in 1936	Started in 1950	–	Harry Kipke
1930	Northwestern	5–0	7–1	Started in 1936	Started in 1950	–	Dick Hanley
1931	Michigan	5–1	8–1–1	Started in 1936	Started in 1950	–	Harry Kipke
1931	Northwestern	5–1	7–1–1	Started in 1936	Started in 1950	–	Dick Hanley
1931	Purdue	5–1	9–1	Started in 1936	Started in 1950	–	Noble Kizer
1932	Michigan*	6–0	8–0	Started in 1936	Started in 1950	–	Harry Kipke
1932	Purdue	5–0–1	7–0–1	Started in 1936	Started in 1950	–	Noble Kizer
1933	Michigan*	5–0–1	7–0–1	Started in 1936	Started in 1950	–	Harry Kipke
1933	Minnesota	2–0–4	4–0–4	Started in 1936	Started in 1950	–	Bernie Bierman
1934	Minnesota*	5–0	8–0	Started in 1936	Started in 1950	–	Bernie Bierman
1935	Minnesota*	5–0	8–0	Started in 1936	Started in 1950	–	Bernie Bierman
1935	Ohio State	5–0	7–1	Started in 1936	Started in 1950	–	Francis Schmidt
1936	Northwestern	6–0	7–1	No. 7	Started in 1950	–	Pappy Waldorf
1937	Minnesota	5–0	6–2	No. 5	Started in 1950	–	Bernie Bierman
1938	Minnesota	4–1	6–2	No. 10	Started in 1950	–	Bernie Bierman
1939	Ohio State	5–1	6–2	No. 15	Started in 1950	–	Francis Schmidt
1940	Minnesota*	6–0	8–0	No. 1	Started in 1950	–	Bernie Bierman
1941	Minnesota*	5–0	8–0	No. 1	Started in 1950	–	Bernie Bierman
1942	Ohio State*	5–1	9–1	No. 1	Started in 1950	–	Paul Brown
1943	Michigan	6–0	8–1	No. 3	Started in 1950	–	Fritz Crisler
1943	Purdue	6–0	9–0	No. 5	Started in 1950	–	Elmer Burnham
1944	Ohio State	6–0	9–0	No. 2	Started in 1950	–	Carroll Widdoes
1945	Indiana	5–0–1	9–0–1	No. 4	Started in 1950	–	Bo McMillin
1946	Illinois	6–1	8–2	No. 5	Started in 1950	W Rose Bowl 45–14 vs. UCLA	Ray Eliot
1947	Michigan*	6–0	10–0	No. 2	Started in 1950	W Rose Bowl 49–0 vs. USC	Fritz Crisler
1948	Michigan*	5–0	9–0	No. 1	Started in 1950	–	Bennie Oosterbaan
1949	Michigan	4–1–1	6–2–1	No. 7	Started in 1950	–	Bennie Oosterbaan
1949	Ohio State	4–1–1	7–1–2	No. 4	Started in 1950	W Rose Bowl 17–14 vs. California	Wes Fesler
1950	Michigan	4–1–1	6–3–1	No. 9	No. 6	W Rose Bowl 14–6 vs. California	Bennie Oosterbaan
1951	Illinois	5–0–1	9–0–1	No. 4	No. 3	W Rose Bowl 40–7 vs. Stanford	Ray Eliot
1952	Purdue	4–1–1	4–3–2	No. 18	No. 12	–	Stu Holcomb
1952	Wisconsin	4–1–1	6–3–1	No. 11	No. 10	L Rose Bowl 0–7 vs. USC	Ivy Williamson
1953	Illinois	5–1	7–1–1	No. 7	No. 7	–	Ray Eliot
1953	Michigan State	5–1	9–1	No. 3	No. 3	W Rose Bowl 28–20 vs. UCLA	Biggie Munn
1954	Ohio State*	7–0	10–0	No. 1	No. 2	W Rose Bowl 20–7 vs. USC	Woody Hayes
1955	Ohio State	6–0	7–2	No. 5	No. 5	–	Woody Hayes
1956	Iowa	5–1	9–1	No. 3	No. 3	W Rose Bowl 35–19 vs. Oregon State	Forest Evashevski
1957	Ohio State*	7–0	9–1	No. 2	No. 1	W Rose Bowl 10–7 vs. Oregon	Woody Hayes
1958	Iowa*	5–1	8–1–1	No. 2	No. 2	W Rose Bowl 38–12 vs. California	Forest Evashevski
1959	Wisconsin	5–2	7–3	No. 6	No. 6	L Rose Bowl 8–44 vs. Washington	Milt Bruhn
1960	Iowa	5–1	8–1	No. 3	No. 2	–	Forest Evashevski
1960	Minnesota*	6–1	8–2	No. 1	No. 1	L Rose Bowl 7–17 vs. Washington	Murray Warmath
1961	Ohio State*	6–0	8–0–1	No. 2	No. 2	–	Woody Hayes
1962	Wisconsin	6–1	8–2	No. 2	No. 2	L Rose Bowl 37–42 vs. USC	Milt Bruhn
1963	Illinois	5–1–1	8–1–1	No. 2	No. 2	W Rose Bowl 17–7 vs. Washington	Pete Elliott
1964	Michigan	6–1	9–1	No. 4	No. 4	W Rose Bowl 34–7 vs. Oregon State	Bump Elliott
1965	Michigan State*	7–0	10–1	No. 2	No. 1	L Rose Bowl 12–14 vs. UCLA	Duffy Daugherty
1966	Michigan State*	7–0	9–0–1	No. 2	No. 2	–	Duffy Daugherty
1967	Indiana	6–1	9–2	No. 4	No. 6	L Rose Bowl 3–14 vs. USC	John Pont
1967	Minnesota	6–1	8–2	–	No. 14	–	Murray Warmath
1967	Purdue	6–1	8–2	No. 9	No. 9	–	Jack Mollenkopf
1968	Ohio State*	7–0	10–0	No. 1	No. 1	W Rose Bowl 27–16 vs. USC	Woody Hayes
1969	Michigan	6–1	8–3	No. 9	No. 8	L Rose Bowl 3–10 vs. USC	Bo Schembechler
1969	Ohio State	6–1	8–1	No. 4	No. 5	–	Woody Hayes
1970	Ohio State*	7–0	9–1	No. 5	No. 2	L Rose Bowl 17–27 vs. Stanford	Woody Hayes
1971	Michigan	8–0	11–1	No. 6	No. 4	L Rose Bowl 12–13 vs. Stanford	Bo Schembechler
1972	Michigan	7–1	10–1	No. 6	No. 6	–	Bo Schembechler
1972	Ohio State	7–1	9–2	No. 9	No. 3	L Rose Bowl 17–42 vs. USC	Woody Hayes
1973	Michigan	7–0–1	10–0–1	No. 6	No. 6	–	Bo Schembechler
1973	Ohio State	7–0–1	10–0–1	No. 2	No. 3	W Rose Bowl 42–21 vs. USC	Woody Hayes
1974	Michigan	7–1	10–1	No. 3	No. 5	–	Bo Schembechler
1974	Ohio State	7–1	10–2	No. 4	No. 3	L Rose Bowl 17–18 vs. USC	Woody Hayes
1975	Ohio State	8–0	11–1	No. 4	No. 4	L Rose Bowl 10–23 vs. UCLA	Woody Hayes
1976	Michigan	7–1	10–2	No. 3	No. 3	L Rose Bowl 6–14 vs. USC	Bo Schembechler
1976	Ohio State	7–1	9–2–1	No. 6	No. 5	W Orange Bowl 27–10 vs. Colorado	Woody Hayes
1977	Michigan	7–1	10–2	No. 9	No. 8	L Rose Bowl 20–27 vs. Washington	Bo Schembechler
1977	Ohio State	7–1	9–3	No. 11	No. 12	L Sugar Bowl 6–35 vs. Alabama	Woody Hayes
1978	Michigan	7–1	10–2	No. 5	No. 5	L Rose Bowl 10–17 vs. USC	Bo Schembechler
1978	Michigan State	7–1	8–3	No. 12	–	–	Darryl Rogers
1979	Ohio State	8–0	11–1	No. 4	No. 4	L Rose Bowl 16–17 vs. USC	Earle Bruce
1980	Michigan	8–0	10–2	No. 4	No. 4	W Rose Bowl 23–6 vs. Washington	Bo Schembechler
1981	Iowa	6–2	8–4	No. 18	No. 15	L Rose Bowl 0–28 vs. Washington	Hayden Fry
1981	Ohio State	6–2	9–3	No. 15	No. 12	W Liberty Bowl 31–28 vs. Navy	Earle Bruce
1982	Michigan	8–1	8–4	–	No. 15	L Rose Bowl 14–24 vs. UCLA	Bo Schembechler
1983	Illinois	9–0	10–2	No. 10	No. 10	L Rose Bowl 9–45 vs. UCLA	Mike White
1984	Ohio State	7–2	9–3	No. 13	No. 12	L Rose Bowl 17–20 vs. USC	Earle Bruce
1985	Iowa	7–1	10–2	No. 10	No. 9	L Rose Bowl 28–45 vs. UCLA	Hayden Fry
1986	Michigan	7–1	11–2	No. 8	No. 7	L Rose Bowl 15–22 vs. Arizona State	Bo Schembechler
1986	Ohio State	7–1	10–3	No. 7	No. 6	W Cotton Bowl Classic 28–12 vs. Texas A&M	Earle Bruce
1987	Michigan State	7–0–1	9–2–1	No. 8	No. 8	W Rose Bowl 20–17 vs. USC	George Perles
1988	Michigan	7–0–1	9–2–1	No. 4	No. 4	W Rose Bowl 22–14 vs. USC	Bo Schembechler
1989	Michigan	8–0	10–2	No. 7	No. 8	L Rose Bowl 10–17 vs. USC	Bo Schembechler
1990	Illinois	6–2	8–4	No. 25	No. 24	L Hall of Fame Bowl 0–30 vs. Clemson	John Mackovic
1990	Iowa	6–2	8–4	No. 18	No. 16	L Rose Bowl 34–46 vs. Washington	Hayden Fry
1990	Michigan	6–2	9–3	No. 7	No. 8	W Gator Bowl 35–3 vs. Ole Miss	Gary Moeller
1990	Michigan State	6–2	8–3–1	No. 16	No. 14	W John Hancock Bowl 17–16 vs. USC	George Perles
1991	Michigan	8–0	10–2	No. 6	No. 6	L Rose Bowl 14–34 vs. Washington	Gary Moeller
1992	Michigan	6–0–2	9–0–3	No. 5	No. 5	W Rose Bowl 38–31 vs. Washington	Gary Moeller
1993	Ohio State	6–1–1	10–1–1	No. 11	No. 10	W Holiday Bowl 28–21 vs. BYU	John Cooper
1993	Wisconsin	6–1–1	10–1–1	No. 6	No. 5	W Rose Bowl 21–16 vs. UCLA	Barry Alvarez
1994	Penn State	8–0	12–0	No. 2	No. 2	W Rose Bowl 38–20 vs. Oregon	Joe Paterno
1995	Northwestern	8–0	10–2	No. 8	No. 7	L Rose Bowl 32–41 vs. USC	Gary Barnett
1996	Northwestern	7–1	9–3	No. 15	No. 16	L Florida Citrus Bowl 28–48 vs. Tennessee	Gary Barnett
1996	Ohio State	7–1	11–1	No. 2	No. 2	W Rose Bowl 20–17 vs. Arizona State	John Cooper
1997	Michigan*	8–0	12–0	No. 1	No. 2	W Rose Bowl 21–16 vs. Washington State	Lloyd Carr
1998	Michigan	7–1	10–3	No. 12	No. 12	W Florida Citrus Bowl 45–31 vs. Arkansas	Lloyd Carr
1998	Ohio State	7–1	11–1	No. 2	No. 2	W Sugar Bowl 24–14 vs. Texas A&M	John Cooper
1998	Wisconsin	7–1	11–1	No. 6	No. 5	W Rose Bowl 38–31 vs. UCLA	Barry Alvarez
1999	Wisconsin	7–1	10–2	No. 4	No. 4	W Rose Bowl 17–9 vs. Stanford	Barry Alvarez
2000	Michigan	6–2	9–3	No. 11	No. 10	W Florida Citrus Bowl 31–28 vs. Auburn	Lloyd Carr
2000	Northwestern	6–2	8–4	–	–	L Alamo Bowl 17–66 vs. Nebraska	Randy Walker
2000	Purdue	6–2	8–4	No. 13	No. 13	L Rose Bowl 24–34 vs. Washington	Joe Tiller
2001	Illinois	7–1	10–2	No. 12	No. 12	L Sugar Bowl 34–47 vs. LSU	Ron Turner
2002	Iowa	8–0	11–2	No. 8	No. 8	L Orange Bowl 17–38 vs. USC	Kirk Ferentz
2002	Ohio State*	8–0	14–0	No. 1	No. 1	W Fiesta Bowl 31–24 vs. Miami	Jim Tressel
2003	Michigan	7–1	10–3	No. 6	No. 7	L Rose Bowl 14–28 vs. USC	Lloyd Carr
2004	Iowa	7–1	10–2	No. 8	No. 8	W Capital One Bowl 30–25 vs. LSU	Kirk Ferentz
2004	Michigan	7–1	9–3	No. 14	No. 12	L Rose Bowl 37–38 vs. Texas	Lloyd Carr
2005	Ohio State	7–1	10–2	No. 4	No. 4	W Fiesta Bowl 34–20 vs. Notre Dame	Jim Tressel
2005	Penn State	7–1	11–1	No. 3	No. 3	W Orange Bowl 26–23 ^{3OT} vs. Florida State	Joe Paterno
2006	Ohio State	8–0	12–1	No. 2	No. 2	L BCS Championship Game 14–41 vs. Florida	Jim Tressel
2007	Ohio State	7–1	11–2	No. 5	No. 4	L BCS Championship Game 24–38 vs. LSU	Jim Tressel
2008	Ohio State	7–1	10–3	No. 9	No. 11	L Fiesta Bowl 21–24 vs. Texas	Jim Tressel
2008	Penn State	7–1	11–2	No. 8	No. 8	L Rose Bowl 24–38 vs. USC	Joe Paterno
2009	Ohio State	7–1	11–2	No. 5	No. 5	W Rose Bowl 26–17 vs. Oregon	Jim Tressel
2010^	Michigan State	7–1	11–2	No. 14	No. 14	L Capital One Bowl 7–49 vs. Alabama	Mark Dantonio
2010^	Wisconsin	7–1	11–2	No. 7	No. 8	L Rose Bowl 19–21 vs. TCU	Bret Bielema
2011	Wisconsin	6–2	11–3	No. 10	No. 11	L Rose Bowl 38–45 vs. Oregon	Bret Bielema
2012	Wisconsin	4–4	8–6	–	–	L Rose Bowl 14–20 vs. Stanford	Bret Bielema
2013	Michigan State	8–0	13–1	No. 3	No. 3	W Rose Bowl 24–20 vs. Stanford	Mark Dantonio
2014	Ohio State*	8–0	14–1	No. 1	No. 1	W CFP Semifinal at Sugar Bowl 42–35 vs. Alabama; W CFP National Championship 42–20 vs. Oregon	Urban Meyer
2015	Michigan State	7–1	12–2	No. 6	No. 6	L CFP Semifinal at Cotton Bowl 0–38 vs. Alabama	Mark Dantonio
2016	Penn State	8–1	11–3	No. 7	No. 7	L Rose Bowl 49–52 vs. USC	James Franklin
2017	Ohio State	8–1	12–2	No. 5	No. 5	W Cotton Bowl 24–7 vs. USC	Urban Meyer
2018	Ohio State	8–1	13–1	No. 3	No. 3	W Rose Bowl 28–23 vs. Washington	Urban Meyer
2019	Ohio State	9–0	13–1	No. 3	No. 3	L CFP Semifinal at Fiesta Bowl 23–29 vs. Clemson	Ryan Day
2020	Ohio State	5–0	7–1	No. 2	No. 2	W CFP Semifinal at Sugar Bowl 49–28 vs Clemson; L CFP National Championship 24–52 vs. Alabama	Ryan Day
2021	Michigan	8–1	12–2	No. 3	No. 3	L CFP Semifinal at Orange Bowl 11–34 vs. Georgia	Jim Harbaugh
2022	Michigan	9–0	13–1	No. 3	No. 3	L CFP Semifinal at Fiesta Bowl 45–51 vs. TCU	Jim Harbaugh
2023	Michigan*	9–0	15–0	No. 1	No. 1	W CFP Semifinal at Rose Bowl 27–20 vs. Alabama; W CFP National Championship 34–13 vs. Washington	Jim Harbaugh
2024	Oregon	9–0	13–1	No. 1	No. 1	L CFP Quarterfinal at Rose Bowl 21–41 vs. Ohio State	Dan Lanning
2025	Indiana*	9–0	16–0	No. 1	No. 1	W CFP Quarterfinal at Rose Bowl 38–3 vs. Alabama; W CFP Semifinal at Peach Bowl 56–22 vs. Oregon; W CFP National Championship 27–21 vs. Miami (FL)	Curt Cignetti

Note: an asterisk (*) denotes a national championship for that season recognized by the College Football Data Warehouse.

^ Ohio State vacated all wins from the 2010 season and its share of the championship due to NCAA violations.

== Championships by team ==
Team	Big Ten titles	Outright Big Ten titles	Winning years
Michigan	45	19	**1898**, 1901, **1902**, 1903, 1904, 1906, 1918, 1922, 1923, **1925**, 1926, 1930, 1931, 1932, 1933, 1943, **1947**, **1948**, 1949, **1950**, **1964**, 1969, **1971**, 1972, 1973, 1974, 1976, 1977, 1978, **1980**, **1982**, 1986, **1988**, **1989**, 1990, **1991**, **1992**, **1997**, 1998, 2000, **2003**, 2004, **2021**, **2022**, **2023**
Ohio State	39 (Note: Ohio State vacated all wins from the 2010 season and its share of the title.)	24	**1916**, **1917**, **1920**, 1935, **1939**, **1942**, **1944**, 1949, **1954**, **1955**, **1957**, **1961**, **1968**, 1969, **1970**, 1972, 1973, 1974, **1975**, 1976, 1977, **1979**, 1981, **1984**, 1986, 1993, 1996, 1998, 2002, 2005, **2006**, **2007**, 2008, **2009**, **2014**, **2017**, **2018**, **2019**, **2020**
Minnesota	18	7	1900, 1903, 1904, 1906, **1909**, 1910, **1911**, 1915, 1927, 1933, **1934**, 1935, **1937**, **1938**, **1940**, **1941**, 1960, 1967
Illinois	15	8	1910, **1914**, 1915, 1918, **1919**, 1923, 1927, **1928**, **1946**, **1951**, 1953, **1963**, **1983**, 1990, **2001**
Wisconsin	14	8	**1896**, **1897**, 1901, 1906, **1912**, 1952, **1959**, **1962**, 1993, 1998, **1999**, 2010, **2011**, **2012**
Iowa	11	4	1900, **1921**, 1922, **1956**, **1958**, 1960, 1981, **1985**, 1990, 2002, 2004
Michigan State	9	5	1953, **1965**, **1966**, 1978, **1987**, 1990, 2010, **2013**, **2015**
Northwestern	8	2	1903, 1926, 1930, 1931, **1936**, **1995**, 1996, 2000
Purdue	8	1	1918, **1929**, 1931, 1932, 1943, 1952, 1967, 2000
Chicago	7	6	**1899**, **1905**, **1907**, **1908**, **1913**, 1922, **1924**
Penn State	4	2	**1994**, 2005, 2008, **2016**
Indiana	3	2	**1945**, 1967, **2025**
Oregon	1	1	**2024**
Nebraska	0	0	
Maryland	0	0	
Rutgers	0	0	
Washington	0	0	
USC	0	0	
UCLA	0	0	

Keys

- Italics indicate a school no longer competing in the Big Ten.
- **Bold** indicates an outright conference championship.

== Championships by head coach ==
Head coach	School	Big Ten Championships
Woody Hayes	Ohio State	13
Bo Schembechler	Michigan	13
Fielding H. Yost	Michigan	10
Henry L. Williams	Minnesota	8
Bernie Bierman	Minnesota	7
Amos Alonzo Stagg	Chicago	7
Robert Zuppke	Illinois	7
Jim Tressel	Ohio State	6^
Lloyd Carr	Michigan	5
Earle Bruce	Ohio State	4
Harry Kipke	Michigan	4
Barry Alvarez	Wisconsin	3
Bret Bielema	Wisconsin	3
John Cooper	Ohio State	3
Mark Dantonio	Michigan State	3
Ray Eliot	Illinois	3
Forest Evashevski	Iowa	3
Hayden Fry	Iowa	3
Jim Harbaugh	Michigan	3
Philip King	Wisconsin	3
Urban Meyer	Ohio State	3
Gary Moeller	Michigan	3
Bennie Oosterbaan	Michigan	3
Joe Paterno	Penn State	3
John Wilce	Ohio State	3
Gary Barnett	Northwestern	2
Milt Bruhn	Wisconsin	2
Fritz Crisler	Michigan	2
Duffy Daugherty	Michigan State	2
Ryan Day	Ohio State	2
Kirk Ferentz	Iowa	2
Dick Hanley	Northwestern	2
Howard Jones	Iowa	2
Noble Kizer	Purdue	2
George Perles	Michigan State	2
Francis Schmidt	Ohio State	2
Murray Warmath	Minnesota	2
Paul Brown	Ohio State	1
Elmer Burnham	Purdue	1
Curt Cignetti	Indiana	1
Bump Elliott	Michigan	1
Pete Elliott	Illinois	1
Gustave Ferbert	Michigan	1
Wes Fesler	Ohio State	1
James Franklin	Penn State	1
Arthur Hall	Illinois	1
Stu Holcomb	Purdue	1
Charles P. Hutchins	Wisconsin	1
William Juneau	Wisconsin	1
Alden Knipe	Iowa	1
Dan Lanning	Oregon	1
John Mackovic	Illinois	1
Walter McCornack	Northwestern	1
Bo McMillin	Indiana	1
Jack Mollenkopf	Purdue	1
Biggie Munn	Michigan State	1
James Phelan	Purdue	1
John Pont	Indiana	1
Darryl Rogers	Michigan State	1
A. G. Scanlon	Purdue	1
Clarence Spears	Minnesota	1
Glenn Thistlethwaite	Northwestern	1
Joe Tiller	Purdue	1
Ron Turner	Illinois	1
Pappy Waldorf	Northwestern	1
Randy Walker	Northwestern	1
Mike White	Illinois	1
Carroll Widdoes	Ohio State	1
Ivy Williamson	Wisconsin	1

^ Ohio State vacated all wins from the 2010 season and their share of the championship

== See also ==
- List of Big Ten Conference football standings (1896–1958)
- List of Big Ten Conference football standings (1959–present)
