= 1926 Big Ten Conference football season =

- Sport: Football
- Number of teams: 10
- Co-champions: Michigan, Northwestern
- Season MVP: Benny Friedman

Football seasons
- ← 1925 1927 →

1926 Big Ten Conference football standings
	Conf.					Overall
Team	W		L		T	W		L		T
No. 3 Michigan +	5	–	0	–	0	7	–	1	–	0
No. 10 Northwestern +	5	–	0	–	0	7	–	1	–	0
No. 8 Ohio State	3	–	1	–	0	7	–	1	–	0
Purdue	2	–	1	–	1	5	–	2	–	1
Wisconsin	3	–	2	–	1	5	–	2	–	1
No. 10 Illinois	2	–	2	–	0	6	–	2	–	0
Minnesota	2	–	2	–	0	5	–	3	–	0
Indiana	0	–	4	–	0	3	–	5	–	0
Iowa	0	–	5	–	0	3	–	5	–	0
Chicago	0	–	5	–	0	2	–	6	–	0
+ – Conference co-champions; Rankings from Dickinson System

The 1926 Big Ten Conference football season was the 31st season of college football played by the member schools of the Big Ten Conference (also known as the Western Conference) and was a part of the 1926 college football season.

== Season overview ==
=== Results and team statistics ===
Conf. Rank	Team	Head coach	DS	Overall record	Conf. record	PPG	PAG
1 (tie)	Michigan	Fielding H. Yost	#3	7–1	5–0	23.9	4.8
1 (tie)	Northwestern	G. Thistlethwaite	#11	7–1	5–0	22.4	2.8
3	Ohio State	John Wilce	#8	7–1	3–1	24.5	5.4
4	Purdue	James Phelan	NR	5–2–1	2–1–1	18.3	8.4
5	Wisconsin	George Little	NR	5–2–1	3–2–1	15.3	9.0
6 (tie)	Illinois	Robert Zuppke	#12	6–2	2–2	15.1	5.8
6 (tie)	Minnesota	Clarence Spears	NR	5-3	2-2	33.6	8.0
8	Indiana	Harlan Page	NR	3–5	0–4	10.0	17.1
9 (tie)	Iowa	Ossie Solem	NR	3–5	0–5	14.1	14.6
9 (tie)	Chicago	Amos A. Stagg	NR	2–6	0–5	5.9	14.5

Key
DS = Ranking in the Dickinson System, a system used at the time to rank the country's best college football teams and to award the Knute Rockne Trophy to the national champion
PPG = Average of points scored per game
PAG = Average of points allowed per game

== All-conference players ==
The following players received first-team honors on the 1932 All-Big Ten Conference football team from at least two of the following selectors: Associated Press (AP), United Press (UP), Billy Evans (BE), and Walter Eckersall (WE).

- Bennie Oosterbaan, end, Michigan (AP, UP, BE, WE)
- Roger B. Wheeler, end, Minnesota (AP, BE, WE)
- Spike Nelson, tackle, Iowa (AP, BE)
- Leo Raskowski, tackle, Ohio State (UP, WE)
- Robert W. Johnson, tackle, Northwestern (BE, WE)
- Ed Hess, guard, Ohio State (AP, UP, BE, WE)
- Bernie Shively, guard, Illinois (AP, BE, WE)
- Robert Reitsch, center, Illinois (AP, UP, WE)
- Benny Friedman, quarterback, Michigan (AP, UP, BE, WE)
- Ralph Baker, halfback, Northwestern (AP, UP, BE, WE)
- Marty Karow, halfback, Ohio State (AP, UP, WE)
- Herb Joesting, Minnesota (AP, UP, BE, WE)

== All-Americans ==
Five Big Ten players were recognized as consensus first-team players on the 1926 College Football All-America Team:

- Bennie Oosterbaan, end, Michigan (AAB, COL, NEA, UP, CEP, WC, BE, ES, WE)
- Bernie Shively, guard, Illinois (AAB, AP, COL, INS, NEA, WC, BE, WE)
- Benny Friedman, quarterback, Michigan (AP, COL, INS, NEA, CP, NYS, BE, HF, LP, RG, ES, WE)
- Ralph Baker, halfback, Northwestern (AP, COL, CP, NYS, LP, WE)
- Herb Joesting, fullback, Minnesota (AAB, AP, COL, INS, NEA, BE, CP, ES, NYS, RG, LP, WC, WE)
