= 1926 Indiana Hoosiers football team =

American college football season

1926 Indiana Hoosiers football
- Conference: Big Ten Conference
- Record: 3–5 (0–4 Big Ten)
- Head coach: Harlan Page (1st season)
- MVP: Frank Sibley
- Captain: Frank Sibley
- Home stadium: Memorial Stadium

1926 Big Ten Conference football standings
	Conf.					Overall
Team	W		L		T	W		L		T
No. 3 Michigan +	5	–	0	–	0	7	–	1	–	0
No. 10 Northwestern +	5	–	0	–	0	7	–	1	–	0
No. 8 Ohio State	3	–	1	–	0	7	–	1	–	0
Purdue	2	–	1	–	1	5	–	2	–	1
Wisconsin	3	–	2	–	1	5	–	2	–	1
No. 10 Illinois	2	–	2	–	0	6	–	2	–	0
Minnesota	2	–	2	–	0	5	–	3	–	0
Indiana	0	–	4	–	0	3	–	5	–	0
Iowa	0	–	5	–	0	3	–	5	–	0
Chicago	0	–	5	–	0	2	–	6	–	0
+ – Conference co-champions; Rankings from Dickinson System

The 1926 Indiana Hoosiers football team represented the Indiana Hoosiers in the 1926 Big Ten Conference football season as members of the Big Ten Conference. The Hoosiers played their home games at Memorial Stadium in Bloomington, Indiana. The team was coached by Harlan Page, in his first year as head coach.

== Schedule ==
Date	Opponent	Site	Result	Attendance	Source
October 2	DePauw*	Memorial Stadium; Bloomington, IN	W 31–7		
October 9	Kentucky*	Memorial Stadium; Bloomington, IN (rivalry)	W 14–6		
October 16	at Northwestern	Dyche Stadium; Evanston, IL	L 0–20		
October 23	at Wisconsin	Camp Randall Stadium; Madison, WI	L 2–27		
October 30	Northwestern	Memorial Stadium; Bloomington, IN	L 0–21		
November 6	at Notre Dame*	Cartier Field; Notre Dame, IN	L 0–26	20,000	
November 13	Mississippi A&M*	Memorial Stadium; Bloomington, IN	W 19–6		
November 20	at Purdue	Ross–Ade Stadium; West Lafayette, IN (Old Oaken Bucket)	L 14–24	14,000	
*Non-conference game
