= 1926 Wisconsin Badgers football team =

American college football season

1926 Wisconsin Badgers football
- Conference: Big Ten Conference
- Record: 5–2–1 (3–2–1 Big Ten)
- Head coach: George Little (2nd season)
- MVP: Jefferson Burrus
- Captain: Doyle Harmon
- Home stadium: Camp Randall Stadium

Uniform
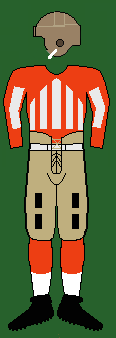

1926 Big Ten Conference football standings
	Conf.					Overall
Team	W		L		T	W		L		T
No. 3 Michigan +	5	–	0	–	0	7	–	1	–	0
No. 10 Northwestern +	5	–	0	–	0	7	–	1	–	0
No. 8 Ohio State	3	–	1	–	0	7	–	1	–	0
Purdue	2	–	1	–	1	5	–	2	–	1
Wisconsin	3	–	2	–	1	5	–	2	–	1
No. 10 Illinois	2	–	2	–	0	6	–	2	–	0
Minnesota	2	–	2	–	0	5	–	3	–	0
Indiana	0	–	4	–	0	3	–	5	–	0
Iowa	0	–	5	–	0	3	–	5	–	0
Chicago	0	–	5	–	0	2	–	6	–	0
+ – Conference co-champions; Rankings from Dickinson System

The 1926 Wisconsin Badgers football team was an American football team that represented the University of Wisconsin in the 1926 Big Ten Conference football season. The team compiled a 5–2–1 record (3–2–1 against conference opponents), finished in fifth place in the Big Ten Conference, and outscored all opponents by a combined total of 122 to 72. George Little was in his second and final year as Wisconsin's head coach.

End Jefferson Burrus was selected as the team's most valuable player. Burrus was also selected by the United Press as a second-team player on the 1926 All-Big Ten Conference football team. Doyle Harmon was the team captain.

The team played its home games at Camp Randall Stadium. The stadium's capacity was expanded in 1926 from 29,783 to 38,293. During the 1926 season, the average attendance at home games was 19,228.

== Schedule ==
Date	Opponent	Site	Result	Attendance	Source
October 2	Cornell (IA)*	Camp Randall Stadium; Madison, WI	W 38–0		
October 9	Kansas*	Camp Randall Stadium; Madison, WI	W 13–0		
October 16	at Purdue	Ross–Ade Stadium; West Lafayette, IN	T 0–0	11,000	
October 23	Indiana	Camp Randall Stadium; Madison, WI	W 27–2		
October 30	Minnesota	Camp Randall Stadium; Madison, WI (rivalry)	L 10–16	42,000	
November 6	at Michigan	Ferry Field; Ann Arbor, MI	L 0–37	48,000	
November 13	Iowa	Camp Randall Stadium; Madison, WI (rivalry)	W 20–10		
November 20	at Chicago	Stagg Field; Chicago, IL	W 14–7	48,000	
*Non-conference game
