= 1926 Iowa Hawkeyes football team =

American college football season

1926 Iowa Hawkeyes football
- Conference: Big Ten Conference
- Record: 3–5 (0–5 Big Ten)
- Head coach: Burt Ingwersen (3rd season)
- MVP: Nick Kutsch
- Captain: Paul Smith
- Home stadium: Iowa Field

1926 Big Ten Conference football standings
	Conf.					Overall
Team	W		L		T	W		L		T
No. 3 Michigan +	5	–	0	–	0	7	–	1	–	0
No. 10 Northwestern +	5	–	0	–	0	7	–	1	–	0
No. 8 Ohio State	3	–	1	–	0	7	–	1	–	0
Purdue	2	–	1	–	1	5	–	2	–	1
Wisconsin	3	–	2	–	1	5	–	2	–	1
No. 10 Illinois	2	–	2	–	0	6	–	2	–	0
Minnesota	2	–	2	–	0	5	–	3	–	0
Indiana	0	–	4	–	0	3	–	5	–	0
Iowa	0	–	5	–	0	3	–	5	–	0
Chicago	0	–	5	–	0	2	–	6	–	0
+ – Conference co-champions; Rankings from Dickinson System

The 1926 Iowa Hawkeyes football team was an American football team represented the University of Iowa as a member of the Big Ten Conference during the 1926 Big Ten football season. In their third year under head coach Burt Ingwersen, the Hawkeyes compiled a 3–5 record (0–5 in conference games), tied for last place in the Big Ten, and was outscored by a total of 117 to 113.

The team played its home games at Iowa Field in Iowa City, Iowa.

== Schedule ==
Date	Opponent	Site	Result	Source
October 2	Colorado State Teachers*	Iowa Field; Iowa City, IA	W 24–0	
October 9	North Dakota*	Iowa Field; Iowa City, IA	W 40–7	
October 16	at Illinois	Memorial Stadium; Champaign, IL	L 6–13	
October 23	at Ohio State	Ohio Stadium; Columbus, OH	L 6–23	
October 30	Carroll (WI)*	Iowa Field; Iowa City, IA	W 21–0	
November 6	Minnesota^{†}	Iowa Field; Iowa City, IA (rivalry)	L 0–41	
November 13	at Wisconsin	Camp Randall Stadium; Madison, WI (rivalry)	L 10–20	
November 20	at Northwestern	Dyche Stadium; Evanston, IL	L 6–13	
*Non-conference game; ^{†}Homecoming
