= 1926 Purdue Boilermakers football team =

American college football season

1926 Purdue Boilermakers football
- Conference: Big Ten Conference
- Record: 5–2–1 (2–1–1 Big Ten)
- Head coach: James Phelan (5th season)
- Captain: Tom E. Hogan
- Home stadium: Ross–Ade Stadium

1926 Big Ten Conference football standings
| | Conf. | | | | | Overall |
| Team | W | | L | | T | W | | L | | T |
|---|---|---|---|---|---|---|---|---|---|---|
| No. 3 Michigan + | 5 | – | 0 | – | 0 | 7 | – | 1 | – | 0 |
| No. 10 Northwestern + | 5 | – | 0 | – | 0 | 7 | – | 1 | – | 0 |
| No. 8 Ohio State | 3 | – | 1 | – | 0 | 7 | – | 1 | – | 0 |
| Purdue | 2 | – | 1 | – | 1 | 5 | – | 2 | – | 1 |
| Wisconsin | 3 | – | 2 | – | 1 | 5 | – | 2 | – | 1 |
| No. 10 Illinois | 2 | – | 2 | – | 0 | 6 | – | 2 | – | 0 |
| Minnesota | 2 | – | 2 | – | 0 | 5 | – | 3 | – | 0 |
| Indiana | 0 | – | 4 | – | 0 | 3 | – | 5 | – | 0 |
| Iowa | 0 | – | 5 | – | 0 | 3 | – | 5 | – | 0 |
| Chicago | 0 | – | 5 | – | 0 | 2 | – | 6 | – | 0 |
+ – Conference co-champions; Rankings from Dickinson System

The 1926 Purdue Boilermakers football team was an American football team that represented Purdue University during the 1926 Big Ten Conference football season. In their fifth season under head coach James Phelan, the Boilermakers compiled a 5–2–1 record, finished in fourth place in the Big Ten Conference with a 2–1–1 record against conference opponents, and outscored opponents by a total of 146 to 67. Tom E. Hogan was the team captain.

== Schedule ==
| Date | Opponent | Site | Result | Attendance | Source |
|---|---|---|---|---|---|
| October 2 | at Navy* | Thompson Stadium; Annapolis, MD | L 13–17 | | |
| October 9 | Wabash* | Ross–Ade Stadium; West Lafayette, IN | W 21–14 | 8,000 | |
| October 16 | Wisconsin | Ross–Ade Stadium; West Lafayette, IN | T 0–0 | 11,000 | |
| October 23 | at Chicago | Stagg Field; Chicago, IL (rivalry) | W 6–0 | 40,000 | |
| October 30 | Indiana State* | Ross–Ade Stadium; West Lafayette, IN | W 38–0 | | |
| November 6 | at Northwestern | Dyche Stadium; Evanston, IL | L 0–22 | 37,000 | |
| November 13 | Franklin* | Ross–Ade Stadium; West Lafayette, IN | W 44–0 | | |
| November 20 | Indiana | Ross–Ade Stadium; West Lafayette, IN (Old Oaken Bucket) | W 24–14 | 14,000 | |
*Non-conference game

== Roster ==
- Don Cameron, T
- W. H. Coleman, G
- Larry Deephouse, G
- Burt Dreyer, C
- Edwin Eickmann, T
- Herb Galletch, T
- M. L. Gladders, HB
- Al Guthrie, HB
- Tom Hogan, E
- A. F. Hook, G
- G. F. Houston, LH
- Leon Hutton, E
- John Isley, FB
- Abraham Koranksy, FB
- Sylvan Leichtle, RH
- Red Mackey, E
- William Mackle, E
- H. Mierau, G
- William Miller, FB
- Harvey Olson, C
- George Prentice, G
- Albert Rabe, C
- Seymour Ramby, FB
- L. R. Sindelar, E
- Paul Smiley, QB
- G. P. Snow, T
- Roger Speidel, QB
- A. L. Spencer, G
- John Stillwell, E
- Chester Wilcox, HB
- Robert Wilson, QB
- Herm Winkler, T
