= 1926 Minnesota Golden Gophers football team =

American college football season

1926 Minnesota Golden Gophers football
- Conference: Big Ten Conference
- Record: 5–3 (2–2 Big Ten)
- Head coach: Clarence Spears (2nd season)
- Captain: Roger Wheeler
- Home stadium: Memorial Stadium

1926 Big Ten Conference football standings
	Conf.					Overall
Team	W		L		T	W		L		T
No. 3 Michigan +	5	–	0	–	0	7	–	1	–	0
No. 10 Northwestern +	5	–	0	–	0	7	–	1	–	0
No. 8 Ohio State	3	–	1	–	0	7	–	1	–	0
Purdue	2	–	1	–	1	5	–	2	–	1
Wisconsin	3	–	2	–	1	5	–	2	–	1
No. 10 Illinois	2	–	2	–	0	6	–	2	–	0
Minnesota	2	–	2	–	0	5	–	3	–	0
Indiana	0	–	4	–	0	3	–	5	–	0
Iowa	0	–	5	–	0	3	–	5	–	0
Chicago	0	–	5	–	0	2	–	6	–	0
+ – Conference co-champions; Rankings from Dickinson System

The 1926 Minnesota Golden Gophers football team represented the University of Minnesota in the 1926 Big Ten Conference football season. In their second year under head coach Clarence Spears, the Golden Gophers compiled a 5–3 record and outscored their opponents by a combined score of 269 to 57.

Fullback Herb Joesting was named an All-American by the Associated Press and Look Magazine. Joestring, Tackle Mitchell Gary, guard Harold Hanson and end Roger Wheeler were named All-Big Ten first team.

Total attendance for the season was 156,032, which averaged out to 31,206 per game. The season high for attendance was against rival Michigan.

== Schedule ==
Date	Opponent	Site	Result	Attendance	Source
October 2	North Dakota*	Memorial Stadium; Minneapolis, MN	W 51–0	18,000	
October 9	Notre Dame*	Memorial Stadium; Minneapolis, MN	L 7–20	54,000	
October 16	at Michigan	Ferry Field; Ann Arbor, MI (Little Brown Jug)	L 0–20	48,000–54,000	
October 23	Wabash*	Memorial Stadium; Minneapolis, MN	W 67–7	16,000	
October 30	at Wisconsin	Camp Randall Stadium; Madison, WI (rivalry)	W 16–10	42,000	
November 6	at Iowa	Iowa Field; Iowa City, IA (rivalry)	W 41–0	30,000	
November 13	Butler*	Memorial Stadium; Minneapolis, MN	W 81–0	8,000	
November 20	Michigan^{†}	Memorial Stadium; Minneapolis, MN (Little Brown Jug)	L 6–7	58,000	
*Non-conference game; ^{†}Homecoming

== Game summaries ==
=== Michigan ===
On November 20, 1926, Minnesota lost to Michigan by a 7–6 score at Memorial Stadium. The game was the last for Michigan under head coach Fielding Yost. Herb Joesting scored on a short run in the second quarter, but Peplaw missed the attempted at extra point. Michigan trailed 6–0 in the fourth quarter when Nydahl of Minnesota fumbled. Oosterbaan picked up the loose ball and ran 58 yards for a touchdown. Friedman drop-kicked the extra point.
