= 1926 Chicago Maroons football team =

American college football season

1926 Chicago Maroons football
- Conference: Big Ten Conference
- Record: 2–6 (0–5 Big Ten)
- Head coach: Amos Alonzo Stagg (35th season)
- Home stadium: Stagg Field

Uniform
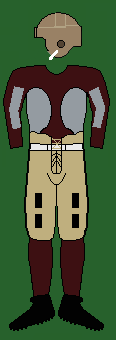

1926 Big Ten Conference football standings
	Conf.					Overall
Team	W		L		T	W		L		T
No. 3 Michigan +	5	–	0	–	0	7	–	1	–	0
No. 10 Northwestern +	5	–	0	–	0	7	–	1	–	0
No. 8 Ohio State	3	–	1	–	0	7	–	1	–	0
Purdue	2	–	1	–	1	5	–	2	–	1
Wisconsin	3	–	2	–	1	5	–	2	–	1
No. 10 Illinois	2	–	2	–	0	6	–	2	–	0
Minnesota	2	–	2	–	0	5	–	3	–	0
Indiana	0	–	4	–	0	3	–	5	–	0
Iowa	0	–	5	–	0	3	–	5	–	0
Chicago	0	–	5	–	0	2	–	6	–	0
+ – Conference co-champions; Rankings from Dickinson System

The 1926 Chicago Maroons football team was an American football team that represented the University of Chicago during the 1926 Big Ten Conference football season. In their 35th season under head coach Amos Alonzo Stagg, the Maroons compiled a 2–6 record, finished last in the Big Ten Conference, and were outscored by their opponents by a combined total of 116 to 47.

Fritz Crisler was an assistant coach on the team.

== Schedule ==
Date	Opponent	Site	Result	Attendance	Source
October 2	Florida*	Stagg Field; Chicago, IL	W 12–6	30,000	
October 9	Maryland*	Stagg Field; Chicago, IL	W 21–0	35,000	
October 16	at Penn*	Franklin Field; Philadelphia, PA	L 0–27	40,000	
October 23	Purdue	Stagg Field; Chicago, IL (rivalry)	L 0–6	40,000	
October 30	Ohio State	Stagg Field; Chicago, IL	L 0–18	48,000	
November 6	Illinois	Stagg Field; Chicago, IL	L 0–7	47,274-50,000	
November 13	at Northwestern	Dyche Stadium; Evanston, IL	L 7–38	47,000	
November 20	Wisconsin	Stagg Field; Chicago, IL	L 7–14	48,000	
*Non-conference game
