= 1926 Ohio State Buckeyes football team =

American college football season

1926 Ohio State Buckeyes football
- Conference: Big Ten Conference
- Record: 7–1 (3–1 Big Ten)
- Head coach: John Wilce (14th season)
- Home stadium: Ohio Stadium

1926 Big Ten Conference football standings
| | Conf. | | | | | Overall |
| Team | W | | L | | T | W | | L | | T |
|---|---|---|---|---|---|---|---|---|---|---|
| No. 3 Michigan + | 5 | – | 0 | – | 0 | 7 | – | 1 | – | 0 |
| No. 10 Northwestern + | 5 | – | 0 | – | 0 | 7 | – | 1 | – | 0 |
| No. 8 Ohio State | 3 | – | 1 | – | 0 | 7 | – | 1 | – | 0 |
| Purdue | 2 | – | 1 | – | 1 | 5 | – | 2 | – | 1 |
| Wisconsin | 3 | – | 2 | – | 1 | 5 | – | 2 | – | 1 |
| No. 10 Illinois | 2 | – | 2 | – | 0 | 6 | – | 2 | – | 0 |
| Minnesota | 2 | – | 2 | – | 0 | 5 | – | 3 | – | 0 |
| Indiana | 0 | – | 4 | – | 0 | 3 | – | 5 | – | 0 |
| Iowa | 0 | – | 5 | – | 0 | 3 | – | 5 | – | 0 |
| Chicago | 0 | – | 5 | – | 0 | 2 | – | 6 | – | 0 |
+ – Conference co-champions; Rankings from Dickinson System

The 1926 Ohio State Buckeyes football team represented Ohio State University in the 1926 Big Ten Conference football season. The Buckeyes compiled a 7–1 record. Bucks outscored opponents 196–43, but suffered a devastating one-point loss to Michigan, their fifth straight loss to the Wolverines. The team was ranked No. 10 in the nation in the Dickinson System ratings released in December 1926.

== Schedule ==
| Date | Opponent | Site | Result | Attendance | Source |
|---|---|---|---|---|---|
| October 2 | Wittenberg* | Ohio Stadium; Columbus, OH | W 40–14 | | |
| October 9 | Ohio Wesleyan* | Ohio Stadium; Columbus, OH | W 47–0 | | |
| October 16 | at Columbia* | Polo Grounds; New York, NY | W 32–7 | | |
| October 23 | Iowa | Ohio Stadium; Columbus, OH | W 23–6 | | |
| October 30 | at Chicago | Stagg Field; Chicago, IL | W 18–0 | 48,000 | |
| November 6 | Wilmington (OH)* | Ohio Stadium; Columbus, OH | W 13–7 | | |
| November 13 | Michigan | Ohio Stadium; Columbus, OH (rivalry) | L 16–17 | | |
| November 20 | at Illinois | Memorial Stadium; Champaign, IL (Illibuck) | W 7–6 | | |
*Non-conference game

== Coaching staff ==
- John Wilce, head coach, 14th year
