= 1926 Illinois Fighting Illini football team =

American college football season

1926 Illinois Fighting Illini football
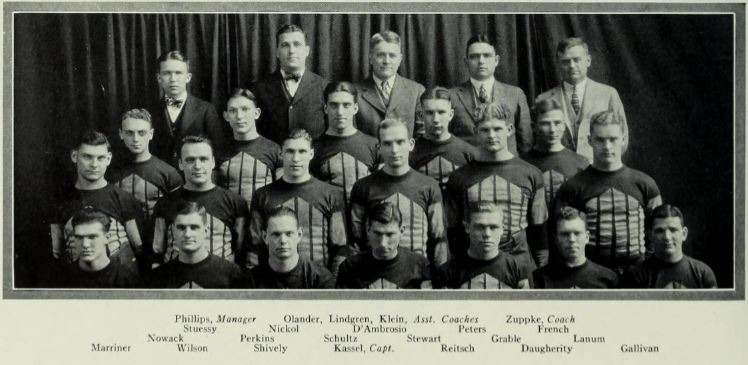
- Conference: Big Ten Conference
- Record: 6–2 (2–2 Big Ten)
- Head coach: Robert Zuppke (14th season)
- Offensive scheme: Single-wing
- Captain: Charles E. Kassel
- Home stadium: Memorial Stadium

Uniform
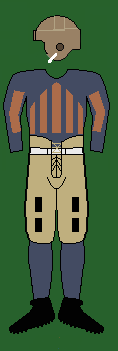

1926 Big Ten Conference football standings
	Conf.					Overall
Team	W		L		T	W		L		T
No. 3 Michigan +	5	–	0	–	0	7	–	1	–	0
No. 10 Northwestern +	5	–	0	–	0	7	–	1	–	0
No. 8 Ohio State	3	–	1	–	0	7	–	1	–	0
Purdue	2	–	1	–	1	5	–	2	–	1
Wisconsin	3	–	2	–	1	5	–	2	–	1
No. 10 Illinois	2	–	2	–	0	6	–	2	–	0
Minnesota	2	–	2	–	0	5	–	3	–	0
Indiana	0	–	4	–	0	3	–	5	–	0
Iowa	0	–	5	–	0	3	–	5	–	0
Chicago	0	–	5	–	0	2	–	6	–	0
+ – Conference co-champions; Rankings from Dickinson System

The 1926 Illinois Fighting Illini football team was an American football team that represented the University of Illinois during the 1926 Big Ten Conference football season. In their 14th season under head coach Robert Zuppke, the Illini compiled a 6–2 record and finished in a tie for sixth place in the Big Ten Conference. Charles E. Kassel was the team captain.

== Schedule ==
Date	Opponent	Site	Result	Attendance	Source
October 2	Coe*	Memorial Stadium; Champaign, IL	W 27–0	19,144	
October 9	Butler*	Memorial Stadium; Champaign, IL	W 38–7	8,101	
October 16	Iowa	Memorial Stadium; Champaign, IL	W 13–6	42,555	
October 23	at Michigan	Ferry Field; Ann Arbor, MI (rivalry)	L 0–13	46,688	
October 30	Penn*	Memorial Stadium; Champaign, IL	W 3–0	58,661	
November 6	at Chicago	Stagg Field; Chicago, IL	W 7–0	47,274–50,000	
November 13	Wabash*	Memorial Stadium; Champaign, IL	W 27–13	5,762	
November 20	Ohio State	Memorial Stadium; Champaign, IL (Illibuck)	L 6–7	28,755	
*Non-conference game

== Awards and honors ==
Illinois player Stewart making a 5-yard gain during game against Chicago

- Bernie Shively, guard: Consensus All-American
- Robert Reitsch, center: All-American
