= James Phelan (American football) =

American football player and coach (1892–1974)

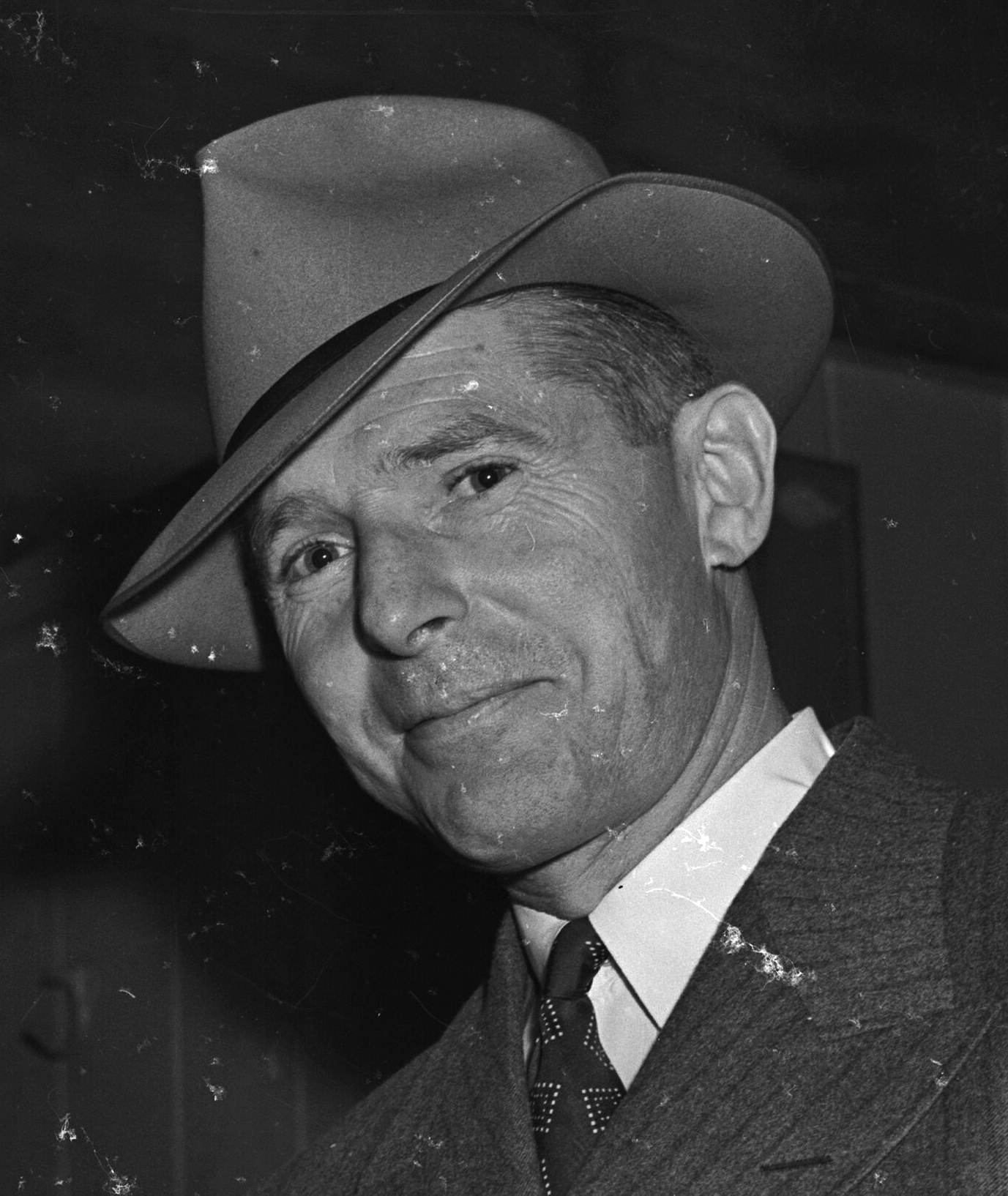
- Phelan in 1938

Biographical details
- Born: December 5, 1892; Sacramento, California, U.S.
- Died: November 14, 1974 (aged 81); Honolulu, Hawaii, U.S.

Playing career

Football
- 1915–1917: Notre Dame
- Position: Quarterback

Coaching career (HC unless noted)

Football
- 1919: Missouri (assistant)
- 1920–1921: Missouri
- 1922–1929: Purdue
- 1930–1941: Washington
- 1942–1947: Saint Mary's
- 1948–1949: Los Angeles Dons
- 1951: New York Yanks
- 1952: Dallas Texans

Basketball
- 1943–1945: Saint Mary's

Head coaching record
- Overall: 137–87–14 (college football); 13–35–2 (AAFC/NFL); 10–11 (college basketball)
- Bowls: 1–3

Accomplishments and honors

Championships
- Football; Big Ten (1929); PCC (1936)
- College Football Hall of Fame; Inducted in 1973 (profile)

James Michael Phelan (December 5, 1892 – November 14, 1974) was an American football player and coach of football and basketball. He served as the head football coach at the University of Missouri (1920–1921), Purdue University (1922–1929), the University of Washington (1930–1941), and Saint Mary's College of California (1942–1947), compiling a career college football record of 137–87–14.

Phelan also coached the Los Angeles Dons of the All-America Football Conference (AAFC) from 1948 to 1949, the New York Yanks and Dallas Texans of the National Football League (NFL) in 1951 and 1952, tallying a professional football coaching record of 13–35–2. In addition, he was the head basketball coach at Saint Mary's for two seasons during World War II (1943–1945), where he amassed a record 10–11. Phelan played college football as a quarterback at the University of Notre Dame from 1915 to 1917. He was inducted into the College Football Hall of Fame as a coach in 1973.

== Playing career ==
After growing up in Portland, Oregon, Phelan went to Notre Dame in 1915. In his first game as a reserve quarterback and placekicker for the football team, he threw for a touchdown and ran for another in a 32–0 victory over Alma College. This earned him the starting job, and he would go on to complete a 7–1 season, the lone defeat was by one point at Nebraska.

The 1916 team was a defensive juggernaut, shutting out every team it played except for its meeting with Army, which it lost 30–10, thus finishing the season 8–1. The 1917 campaign began with a 55–0 victory over Kalamazoo, followed by a scoreless tie at Wisconsin, in which Phelan attempted to win the game by kicking a 61-yard field goal; the ball bounced off the crossbar. A 7–0 loss at Nebraska the following week was the last game of his career, as he was drafted into military service for World War I and sent to Camp Taylor in Louisville, Kentucky.

== Coaching career ==
Following the war, Phelan entered the college coaching ranks. From 1920 to 1921, he coached at Missouri, and compiled a 13–3 record. From 1922 to 1929, he coached at Purdue, and compiled a 35–22–4 record there. From 1930 to 1941, he coached at Washington in Seattle, and compiled a 65–37–9 record there.

Following a six-year stint as head coach of Saint Mary's (CA) that included two bowl appearances, Phelan joined the coaching staff of three professional football franchises, including a two-year stint as the head coach of the Los Angeles Dons and one season as head coach of the NFL's Dallas Texans in 1952.

Phelan was inducted into the College Football Hall of Fame in 1973.

== Head coaching record ==
=== College football ===
Year	Team	Overall	Conference	Standing	Bowl/playoffs	AP^{#}
Missouri Tigers (Missouri Valley Conference) (1920–1921)
1920	Missouri	7–1	5–1	2nd		
1921	Missouri	6–2	4–2	T–2nd		
Missouri:		13–3	9–3			
Purdue Boilermakers (Big Ten Conference) (1922–1929)
1922	Purdue	1–5–1	0–3–1	10th		
1923	Purdue	2–5–1	1–4	T–8th		
1924	Purdue	5–2	2–2	5th		
1925	Purdue	3–4–1	0–3–1	T–9th		
1926	Purdue	5–2–1	2–1–1	4th		
1927	Purdue	6–2	2–2	T–4th		
1928	Purdue	5–2–1	2–2–1	6th		
1929	Purdue	8–0	5–0	1st		
Purdue:		35–22–5	14–17–4			
Washington Huskies (Pacific Coast Conference) (1930–1941)
1930	Washington	5–4	3–4	5th		
1931	Washington	5–3–1	3–3–1	5th		
1932	Washington	6–2–2	3–2–2	4th		
1933	Washington	5–4	3–4	7th		
1934	Washington	6–1–1	5–1–1	3rd		
1935	Washington	5–3	4–3	6th		
1936	Washington	7–2–1	7–0–1	1st	L Rose	5
1937	Washington	7–2–2	4–2–2	3rd	W Poi	
1938	Washington	3–5–1	3–4–1	6th		
1939	Washington	4–5	4–4	4th		
1940	Washington	7–2	7–1	2nd		10
1941	Washington	5–4	5–3	T–2nd		
Washington:		65–37–8	51–31–8			
Saint Mary's Gaels (Independent) (1942–1947)
1942	Saint Mary's	6–3–1				
1943	Saint Mary's	2–5				
1944	Saint Mary's	0–5				
1945	Saint Mary's	7–2			L Sugar	
1946	Saint Mary's	6–3			L Oil	
1947	Saint Mary's	3–7				
Saint Mary's:		24–25–1				
Total:		137–87–14				
National championship Conference title Conference division title or championship game berth
^{#}Rankings from final AP Poll.
