= Clarence Spears =

American college football player and coach (1894–1964)

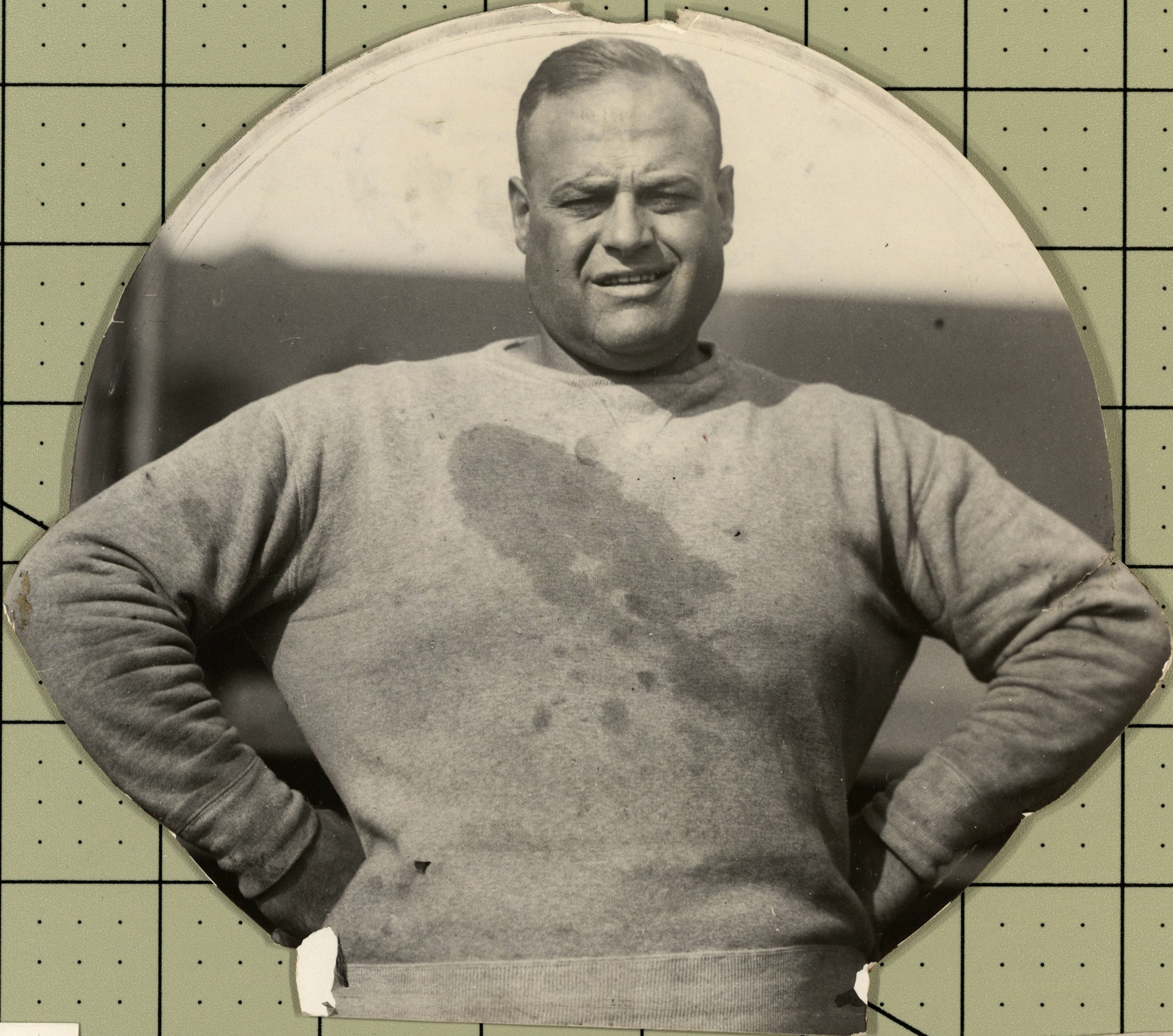
- Spears in 1928

Biographical details
- Born: July 24, 1894; DeWitt, Arkansas, U.S.
- Died: February 1, 1964 (aged 69); Jupiter, Florida, U.S.

Playing career
- 1912: Knox (IL)
- 1914–1915: Dartmouth
- Positions: Guard, tackle

Coaching career (HC unless noted)
- 1917–1920: Dartmouth
- 1921–1924: West Virginia
- 1925–1929: Minnesota
- 1930–1931: Oregon
- 1932–1935: Wisconsin
- 1936–1942: Toledo
- 1943–1944: Maryland

Administrative career (AD unless noted)
- 1936–1942: Toledo

Head coaching record
- Overall: 148–83–14
- Bowls: 1–0

Accomplishments and honors

Championships
- Big Ten (1927)

Awards
- 2× consensus All-American (1914, 1915)
- College Football Hall of Fame; Inducted in 1955 (profile)

Clarence Wiley "Doc" Spears (July 24, 1894 – February 1, 1964) was an American college football player, coach, and doctor. He was an All-American guard at Dartmouth College (1914–1915) and served as the head football coach at Dartmouth (1917–1920), West Virginia University (1921–1924), the University of Minnesota (1925–1929), the University of Oregon (1930–1931), the University of Wisconsin–Madison (1932–1935), the University of Toledo (1936–1942), and University of Maryland, College Park (1943–1944), compiling a career college football record of 148–83–14. Spears was inducted into the College Football Hall of Fame as a player in 1955.

== Early life and playing career ==
Spears was born in DeWitt, Arkansas and attended high school in Kewanee, Illinois. He began his college career at Knox College in Galesburg, Illinois, where he competed in football and track and field during the 1912–13 academic year. He transferred to Dartmouth College in 1913. At Dartmouth, he played guard in football and was selected to the All-America college football team in 1914 and 1915.

== Coaching career ==
Spears was the head coach for the Dartmouth Indians football team from 1917 to 1920. From 1921 to 1924, he coached the West Virginia Mountaineers football team, winning 79.5% of the games he coached during his tenure there. Following that, Spears coached the Minnesota Golden Gophers from 1925 to 1929, leading the team to a 6–0–2 record and a share of the Big Ten Conference title in 1927 He had a 28–9–3 record at Minnesota.

Spears was the coach at Oregon in 1930 and 1931. From 1932 to 1935 he coached the Wisconsin Badgers. From 1936 to 1942, Spears was Toledo's coach. Finally, he was the coach at Maryland in 1943 and 1944, tallying a mark of 5–12–1.

Spears had two undefeated seasons as a coach, 1922 at West Virginia and 1927 at Minnesota. In 1955, he was inducted into the College Football Hall of Fame.

== Medical career ==
While coaching, Spears studied medicine at the University of Chicago and the Rush Medical College. Following his football career, he maintained a medical practice for many years.

== Head coaching record ==
Year	Team	Overall	Conference	Standing	Bowl/playoffs
Dartmouth Indians (Independent) (1917–1920)
1917	Dartmouth	5–3			
1918	Dartmouth	3–3			
1919	Dartmouth	6–1–1			
1920	Dartmouth	7–2			
Dartmouth:		21–9–1			
West Virginia Mountaineers (Independent) (1921–1924)
1921	West Virginia	5–4–1			
1922	West Virginia	10–0–1			W San Diego East-West Christmas Classic
1923	West Virginia	7–1–1			
1924	West Virginia	8–1			
West Virginia:		30–6–3			
Minnesota Golden Gophers (Big Ten Conference) (1925–1929)
1925	Minnesota	5–2–1	1–1–1	T–4th	
1926	Minnesota	5–3	2–2	T–6th	
1927	Minnesota	6–0–2	3–0–1	T–1st	
1928	Minnesota	6–2	4–2	3rd	
1929	Minnesota	6–2	3–2	T–3rd	
Minnesota:		28–9–3	13–7–2		
Oregon Webfoots (Pacific Coast Conference) (1930–1931)
1930	Oregon	7–2	3–1	4th	
1931	Oregon	6–2–2	3–1–1	3rd	
Oregon:		13–4–2	6–2–1		
Wisconsin Badgers (Big Ten Conference) (1932–1935)
1932	Wisconsin	6–1–1	4–1–1	3rd	
1933	Wisconsin	2–5–1	0–5–1	10th	
1934	Wisconsin	4–4	2–3	T–5th	
1935	Wisconsin	1–7	1–4	T–9th	
Wisconsin:		13–17–2	7–13–2		
Toledo Rockets (Ohio Athletic Conference) (1936–1942)
1936	Toledo	2–6	2–2	12th	
1937	Toledo	6–3	0–0	Did not compete	
1938	Toledo	6–3–1	0–0–1	T–11th	
1939	Toledo	7–3	1–0	2nd	
1940	Toledo	6–3	1–1	T–10th	
1941	Toledo	7–4	2–0	2nd	
1942	Toledo	4–4–1	1–0–1	3rd	
Toledo:		38–26–2	7–3–2		
Maryland Terrapins (Southern Conference) (1943–1944)
1943	Maryland	4–5	2–0	2nd	
1944	Maryland	1–7–1	1–1	6th	
Maryland:		5–12–1	3–1		
Total:		148–83–14			
National championship Conference title Conference division title or championship game berth
