= 1926 Michigan Wolverines football team =

American college football season

1926 Michigan Wolverines football
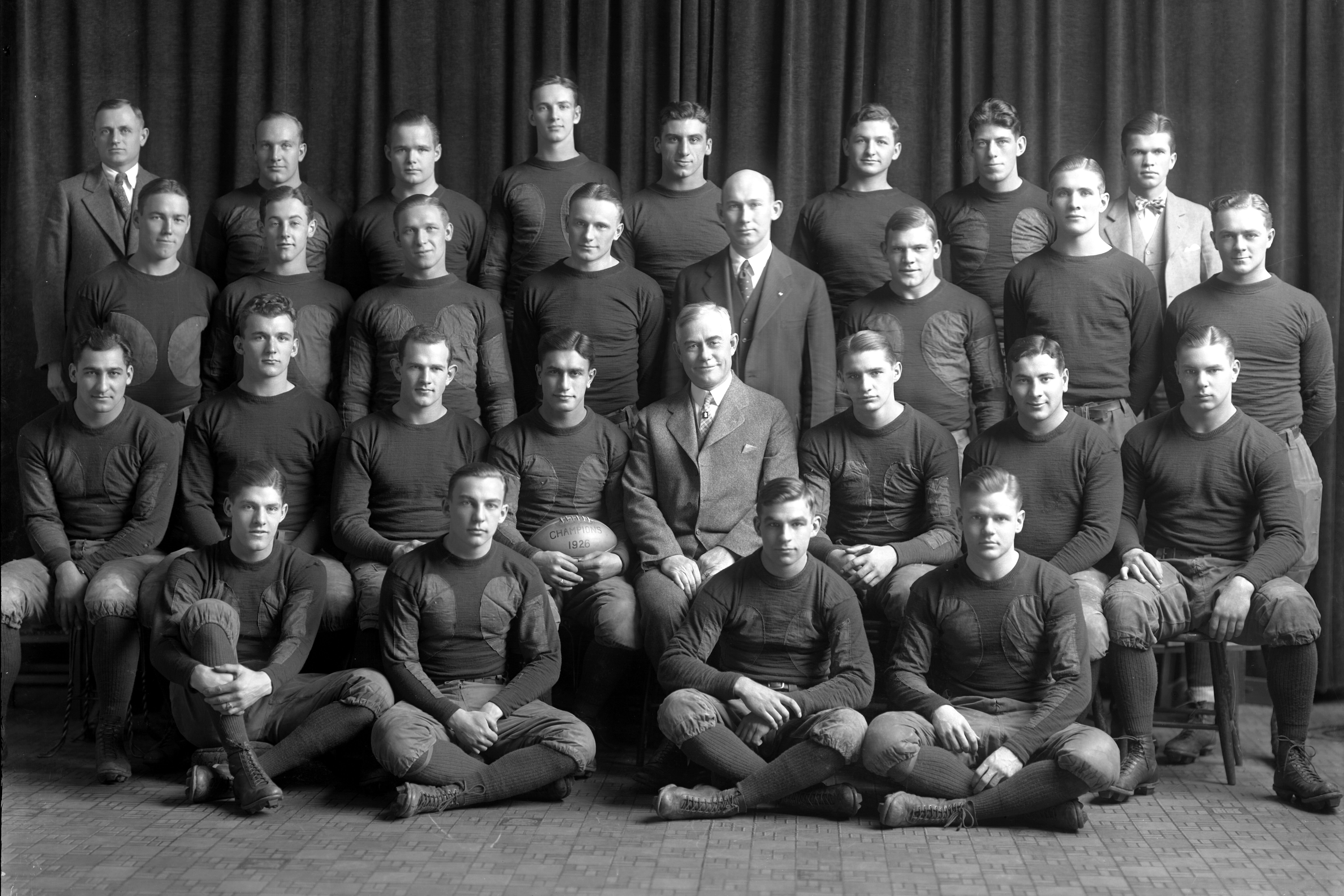

Co-national champion (Sagarin) Big Ten co-champion
- Conference: Big Ten Conference
- Record: 7–1 (5–0 Big Ten)
- Head coach: Fielding H. Yost (25th season)
- MVP: Benny Friedman
- Captain: Benny Friedman
- Home stadium: Ferry Field

Uniform
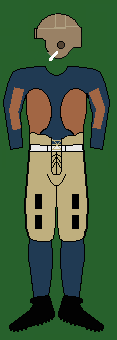

1926 Big Ten Conference football standings
| | Conf. | | | | | Overall |
| Team | W | | L | | T | W | | L | | T |
|---|---|---|---|---|---|---|---|---|---|---|
| No. 3 Michigan + | 5 | – | 0 | – | 0 | 7 | – | 1 | – | 0 |
| No. 10 Northwestern + | 5 | – | 0 | – | 0 | 7 | – | 1 | – | 0 |
| No. 8 Ohio State | 3 | – | 1 | – | 0 | 7 | – | 1 | – | 0 |
| Purdue | 2 | – | 1 | – | 1 | 5 | – | 2 | – | 1 |
| Wisconsin | 3 | – | 2 | – | 1 | 5 | – | 2 | – | 1 |
| No. 10 Illinois | 2 | – | 2 | – | 0 | 6 | – | 2 | – | 0 |
| Minnesota | 2 | – | 2 | – | 0 | 5 | – | 3 | – | 0 |
| Indiana | 0 | – | 4 | – | 0 | 3 | – | 5 | – | 0 |
| Iowa | 0 | – | 5 | – | 0 | 3 | – | 5 | – | 0 |
| Chicago | 0 | – | 5 | – | 0 | 2 | – | 6 | – | 0 |
+ – Conference co-champions; Rankings from Dickinson System

The 1926 Michigan Wolverines football team represented the University of Michigan in the 1926 Big Ten Conference football season. In the team's 25th and final season under head coach Fielding H. Yost, Michigan compiled a record of 7–1, outscored its opponents 191 to 38, and tied with Northwestern for the Big Ten Conference championship. Michigan's only loss was to an undefeated Navy team that was recognized as the national champion by several selectors. At the end of the season, Michigan ranked third in the country under the Dickinson System, trailing only Stanford and Navy. One selector, Jeff Sagarin, has retroactively named Michigan as a 1926 co-national champion.

Quarterback Benny Friedman and end Bennie Oosterbaan were both selected as consensus All-Americans. Friedman was also Michigan's 1926 team captain and most valuable player.

== Schedule ==
| Date | Opponent | Site | Result | Attendance |
|---|---|---|---|---|
| October 2 | Oklahoma A&M* | Ferry Field; Ann Arbor, MI | W 42–3 | 18,000 |
| October 9 | Michigan State* | Ferry Field; Ann Arbor, MI (rivalry) | W 55–3 | 33,000 |
| October 16 | Minnesota | Ferry Field; Ann Arbor, MI (Little Brown Jug) | W 20–0 | 48,000 |
| October 23 | Illinois^{†} | Ferry Field; Ann Arbor, MI (rivalry) | W 13–0 | 48,000 |
| October 30 | at Navy* | Municipal Stadium; Baltimore, MD | L 0–10 | 80,000 |
| November 6 | Wisconsin | Ferry Field; Ann Arbor, MI | W 37–0 | 48,000 |
| November 13 | at Ohio State | Ohio Stadium; Columbus, OH (rivalry) | W 17–16 | 90,411 |
| November 20 | at Minnesota | Memorial Stadium; Minneapolis, MN (Little Brown Jug) | W 7–6 | 55,000 |
*Non-conference game; ^{†}Homecoming

== Game summaries ==
=== Week 1: Oklahoma A&M ===
On October 2, 1926, Michigan defeated Oklahoma A&M at Ferry Field by a 42–3 score. Bo Molenda scored two touchdown in the first quarter which also featured a blocked kick that resulted in a safety. Led by Benny Friedman, Michigan passed for 160 yards.

=== Week 2: Michigan State ===
On October 9, 1926, Michigan defeated Michigan State College by a 55–3 score.

=== Week 3: Minnesota ===
Michigan defeated Minnesota by a 20–0 score. Michigan touchdowns were scored by Bo Molenda, George Rich and Louis Gilbert. Friedman kicked two points after touchdown. Gilbert's touchdown came on a 58-yard run. All 20 points were scored in the first half.

=== Week 4: Illinois ===
Michigan defeated Illinois by a 13–0 score. After a scoreless first quarter, Illinois drove to Michigan's 21-yard line. On fourth down, Illinois opted for a forward pass rather than a field goal attempt. Truskowski intercepted the pass on the 17-yard line. Michigan's first score was set up by a punt that was downed inside the one-yard line. Illinois was then forced to punt from behind the goal line, and Gilbert returne the ball to Illinois' 30-yard line. After a 14-yard gain on a pass to Gilbert, Michigan was stopped, but Friedman kicked a field goal to give Michigan a 3–0 lead at halftime. After a scoreless third quarter, Michigan scored 10 points in the fourth quarter. Michigan's lone touchdown was scored by Bo Molenda. Molenda's touchdown was set up when Lovett intercepted a pass at the Illinois 37-yard line, and Friedman completed a long pass to Oosterbaan. Benny Friedman added the point after touchdown and also kicked his second field goal.

=== Week 5: at Navy ===
Michigan lost to Navy by a 10–0 score at Baltimore, Maryland. Navy's Howard Caldwell ran for a touchdown against the Wolverines. Caldwell's touchdown was the first scored against Michigan since the 1924 season. After the game, the Navy midshipmen stormed the field, tore down the goalposts and broke them into splinters to be kept as souvenirs. The game was played before approximately 50,000 spectators. The 1926 Navy Midshipmen football team went on to complete an undefeated season and was recognized as the national champion by several selectors.

=== Week 6: Wisconsin ===
Michigan defeated Wisconsin by a 37–0 score. Michigan completed 9 of 15 passes for 147 yards. Wisconsin completed only 4 of 20 passes for 36 yards. Friedman threw for a touchdown to Oosterbaan and also caught a touchdown pass from Gilbert. Wally Weber scored two touchdowns, and Friedman, Oosterbaan and Hoffman registered one touchdown each. Friedman kicked for a field goal and four points after touchdown. The margin of victory was the largest in the history of the Michigan-Wisconsin rivalry.

=== Week 7: at Ohio State ===
Michigan defeated Ohio State by a 17–16 score. The crowd of 90,000 at Columbus, Ohio, was reported to be "the greatest crowd that ever paid to see a football game." Ohio State jumped out to an early 10–0 lead. Michigan responded with its own touchdown and field goal to tie the score at 10–10. At the end of the third quarter, Marek of Ohio State was unable to field a punt at his own six-yard line. As Marek had touched the ball, Michigan took possession when it fell on the loose ball. At the start of the fourth quarter, Friedman then threw a touchdown pass and converted the PAT. Ohio State drove down the field for a touchdown, but the PAT attempt by Myers Clark failed.

=== Week 8: at Minnesota ===
On November 20, 1926, Michigan defeated Minnesota by a 7–6 score at Memorial Stadium in Minneapolis. The game was the last for Michigan under head coach Yost. Herb Joesting scored on a short run in the second quarter, but Peplaw missed the attempted at extra point. Michigan trailed 6–0 in the fourth quarter when Nydahl of Minnesota fumbled. Oosterbaan picked up the loose ball and ran 58 yards for a touchdown. Friedman drop-kicked the extra point.

== Players ==
=== Varsity letter winners ===
The following players won varsity letters for their work on the 1926 football team:

- Ray Baer, Louisville, Kentucky – started 6 games at left tackle
- Richard Sidney "Syd" Dewey, Monroe, Michigan – started 6 games at left guard, 1 game at right guard
- Victor E. Domhoff – quarterback
- William R. Flora, Muskegon, Michigan – started 7 games at right end
- Benny Friedman, Cleveland, Ohio – started 7 games at quarterback
- Norman Gabel, Detroit, Michigan – started 6 games at right tackle
- Louis Gilbert, Kalamazoo, Michigan – started 5 games at left halfback
- Harold T. Greenwald, Chicago, Illinois – started 1 game at right halfback
- Henry S. Grinnell – tackle
- William H. Heath – tackle
- LeRoy G. Heston – end
- Leo W. Hoffman – halfback
- John H. Lovette, Saginaw, Michigan – started 5 games at right guard
- Kent C. McIntyre – guard
- James F. Miller Jr., Adrian, Michigan – started 2 games at left halfback
- John J. Molenda, Detroit, Michigan – started 4 games at fullback, 3 games at right halfback
- Herman Z. Nyland Jr. – end
- Bennie Oosterbaan, Muskegon, Michigan – started 7 games at left end
- John M. Palmeroli, Highland Park, Michigan – started 1 game at left guard
- William H. Puckelwartz – quarterback
- George E. Rich, Lakewood, Ohio – started 3 games at right halfback
- John B. Schoenfeld, Bartlesville, Oklahoma – started 2 games at center
- George G. Squires (or Squier), South Haven, Michigan – started 1 game at right guard, 1 game at right tackle
- Joseph R. Truskowski, Detroit, Michigan – started 5 games at center
- Wally Weber, Mt. Clemens, Michigan – started 3 games at fullback

=== aMa letter winners ===
The following players won aMa letters for their work on the 1926 football team:

- Dudley G. Black – fullback
- Frank A. Harrigan – halfback
- Maxwell E. Nickerson – tackle
- Marshall Boden – end
- Frank E. Meese – tackle
- Otto Pommerening, Ann Arbor, Michigan – started 1 game at left tackle
- Raymond A. Cragin – center
- George A. Nicholson Jr. – center

=== Awards and honors ===
- All-Americans: Benny Friedman (consensus), Bennie Oosterbaan (consensus)
- All-Conference: Bennie Oosterbaan (AP-1), Benny Friedman (AP-1), William Flora (AP-2), Ray Baer (AP-2), John Lovette (AP-2)
- Most Valuable Player: Benny Friedman
- Meyer Morton Award: George Rich

== Coaching staff ==
- Head coach: Fielding H. Yost
- Assistant coaches: Jack Blott, Harvey Emery, Ray Fisher, Judson Hyames, Cliff Keen, Harry Kipke, William Louisell, Edwin Mather, George F. Veenker, Tad Wieman
- Trainer: Charles B. Hoyt
- Manager: John S. Denton, James V. Hughey (assistant), Ray C. Humphrey (assistant), Leonard A. Spooner (assistant), Frank L. Wachter (assistant)
