= 1926 Northwestern Wildcats football team =

American college football season

1926 Northwestern Wildcats football

Big Ten co-champion
- Conference: Big Ten Conference
- Record: 7–1 (5–0 Big Ten)
- Head coach: Glenn Thistlethwaite (5th season)
- Captain: Ralph Baker
- Home stadium: Northwestern Field

Uniform
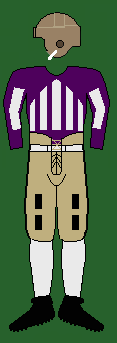

1926 Big Ten Conference football standings
	Conf.					Overall
Team	W		L		T	W		L		T
No. 3 Michigan +	5	–	0	–	0	7	–	1	–	0
No. 10 Northwestern +	5	–	0	–	0	7	–	1	–	0
No. 8 Ohio State	3	–	1	–	0	7	–	1	–	0
Purdue	2	–	1	–	1	5	–	2	–	1
Wisconsin	3	–	2	–	1	5	–	2	–	1
No. 10 Illinois	2	–	2	–	0	6	–	2	–	0
Minnesota	2	–	2	–	0	5	–	3	–	0
Indiana	0	–	4	–	0	3	–	5	–	0
Iowa	0	–	5	–	0	3	–	5	–	0
Chicago	0	–	5	–	0	2	–	6	–	0
+ – Conference co-champions; Rankings from Dickinson System

The 1926 Northwestern Wildcats team represented Northwestern University during the 1926 Big Ten Conference football season. The Wildcats compiled a 7–1 record and outscored their opponents by a combined total of 179 to 22.

== Schedule ==
Date	Opponent	Site	Result	Attendance	Source
October 2	South Dakota*	Dyche Stadium; Evanston, IL	W 34–0		
October 9	Carleton*	Dyche Stadium; Evanston, IL	W 31–3		
October 16	Indiana	Dyche Stadium; Evanston, IL	W 20–0		
October 23	Notre Dame*	Dyche Stadium; Evanston, IL (rivalry)	L 0–6		
October 30	Indiana	Memorial Stadium; Bloomington, IN	W 21–0		
November 6	Purdue	Dyche Stadium; Evanston, IL	W 22–0		
November 13	Chicago	Dyche Stadium; Evanston, IL	W 38–7	47,000	
November 20	Iowa	Iowa Field; Iowa City, IA	W 13–6		
*Non-conference game
