= Dickinson System =

College football championship point formula

The Dickinson System was a mathematical point formula that awarded national championships in college football. Devised by University of Illinois economics professor Frank G. Dickinson, the system ranked national teams from 1924 to 1940. The 1924 ratings were made retroactively by Dickinson during the 1925 college football season, the first in which a number 1 team was designated at the end of the season. The retroactive choice on October 16, 1925, for the 1924 season was Notre Dame.

The system was originally designed to rank teams in the Big Nine (later the Big Ten) conference. Chicago clothing manufacturer Jack Rissman then persuaded Dickinson to rank the nation's teams under the system, and awarded the Rissman Trophy to the winning university.

The Dickinson System was the first to gain widespread national public and media acceptance as a "major selector" according to the NCAA prior to the establishment of the Associated Press poll in 1936.

== Trophies ==
=== Rissman Trophy ===
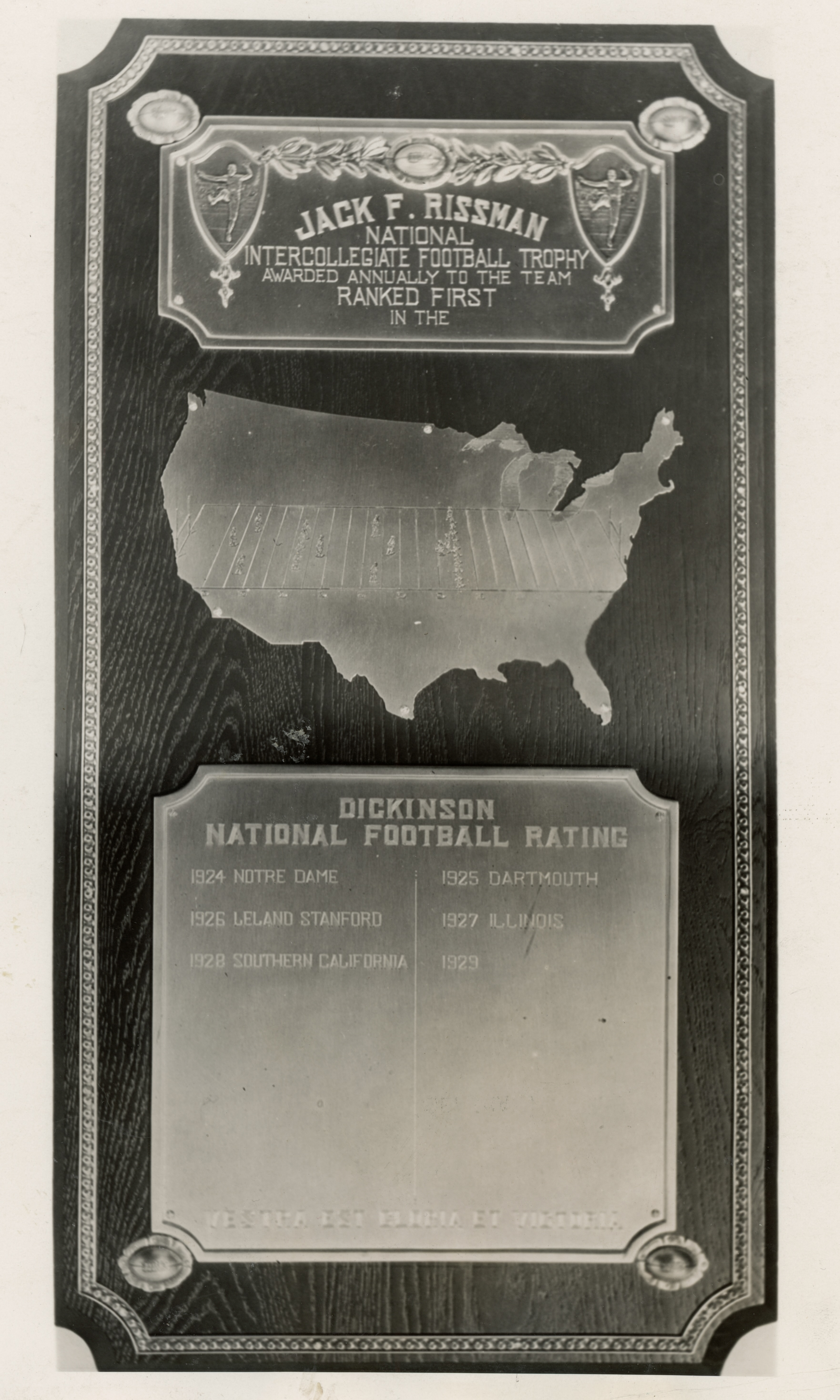
Jack F. Rissman National Intercollegiate Football Trophy

The original Dickinson System prize was the Rissman Trophy, named after Chicago clothing manufacturer Jack F. Rissman, 'a trophy to go to the team which would be scientifically picked by the Dickensen [sic] system of rating (later replaced by the Associate Press poll)'.

The Rissman Trophy was permanently awarded to Notre Dame following their third Dickinson title in 1930.

=== Rockne Trophy ===
Following the retirement of the Rissman Trophy and the death of Knute Rockne in early 1931, the second Dickinson trophy was named the Knute Rockne Intercollegiate Memorial Trophy.

Minnesota retired the Rockne Trophy after winning their third Dickinson title in 1940.

== Methodology ==
An explanation for the mathematical calculations was usually given as part of the story of the season ending rankings. In 1927, an Associated Press story about the "national football championship" for that year noted that "Scores of 96 football teams were compiled by Dr. Dickinson in seven football conferences, including an Eastern group of 25 leading teams regarded for convenience as a conference... The Dickinson system awards 30 points for a victory over a strong team, and 20 for victory over a weak team. Defeats count half as much as victories [15 pts vs. strong team, 10 pts vs. weak team], and ties are considered as games half won and half lost [22.5 points vs. strong, 15 vs. weak]. Dividing this total by the number of games played gives the final rating." Professor Dickinson later added another variable, a "sectional rating" which provided for different points in games where the teams were from different sections of the country.

== Annual rankings ==
Season	No. 1	No. 2	No. 3	No. 4	No. 5	No. 6	No. 7	No. 8	No. 9	No. 10	No. 11	Source
1924	Notre Dame (27.50)	California (25.63)	Yale (21.25)	Illinois (20.88)	Stanford (18.75)	Iowa (17.50)	USC (15.66)	Penn (15.00)	Dartmouth (14.60)	Missouri (14.07)	Chicago (13.13)	
1925	Dartmouth (20.00)	Tie: Michigan (19.38); Alabama (19.38)	--	Colgate (18.75)	Missouri (16.25)	Tulane (15.00)	Washington (14.75)	Tie: Wisconsin (13.75); Stanford (13.75)	--	Pittsburgh (12.50)	Lafayette (11.88)	
1926	Stanford (22.50)	Navy (21.88)	Tie: Michigan (21.25); Notre Dame (21.25)	--	Lafayette (20.00)	USC (17.50)	Alabama (16.67)	Ohio State (16.25)	Army (14.38)	4-Way Tie: Brown (13.75); Illinois (13.75); Northwestern (13.75); Penn (13.75)	--	
1927	Illinois (21.50)	Pittsburgh (21.42)	Minnesota (20.88)	Notre Dame (20.83)	Yale (20.00)	Army (18.75)	Michigan (18.33)	Georgia (17.50)	Nebraska (17.42)	USC (16.35)	Texas A&M (15.00)	
1928	USC (24.13)	California (22.50)	Georgia Tech (20.00)	Tie: Stanford 19.17; Wisconsin (19.17)	--	3-way tie: Carnegie Tech (18.33); Illinois (18.33); Iowa (18.33)	--	--	Army (17.50)	NYU (16.25)	Penn (15.00)	
1929	Notre Dame (25.00)	Purdue (23.60)	Pittsburgh (22.00)	California (20.00)	Illinois (18.70)	USC (17.75)	Nebraska (16.80)	TCU (16.51)	SMU (16.31)	Tulane (16.27)	Penn (15.00)	
1930	Notre Dame (25.13)	Washington State (20.44)	Alabama (20.18)	Northwestern (18.63)	Michigan (18.34)	USC (17.98)	Stanford (17.92)	Dartmouth (17.11)	Army (16.66)	Tennessee (16.15)	Tulane (16.05)	
1931	USC (26.25)	Tulane (24.85)	Tennessee (23.10)	Northwestern (22.45)	Saint Mary's (22.23)	Georgia (21.25)	Harvard (19.50)	Yale (18.79)	Pittsburgh (17.50)	Purdue (16.58)	Notre Dame (16.17)	
1932	Michigan (28.47)	USC (26.81)	Pittsburgh (26.49)	Purdue (26.33)	Colgate (25.00)	Ohio State (23.60)	Notre Dame (20.44)	Army (20.00)	Tennessee (19.16)	TCU (19.12)	Wisconsin (18.80)	
1933	Michigan (28.53)	Nebraska (24.61)	Minnesota (23.87)	Pittsburgh (23.01)	Ohio State (22.79)	USC (22.61)	Princeton (22.50)	Oregon (22.36)	Army (22.16)	Purdue (21.88)	Stanford (20.34)	
1934	Minnesota (23.51)	Pittsburgh (24.19)	Navy (23.00)	Illinois (22.01)	Rice (21.97)	Alabama (21.70)	Columbia (21.67)	Ohio State (21.51)	Colgate (21.06)	Stanford (20.34)	Tulane (21.03)	
1935	SMU (28.01)	Minnesota (27.35)	Princeton (26.00)	LSU (24.03)	Tie: Stanford (23.11); California (23.11)	--	Ohio State (22.21)	TCU (22.01)	Notre Dame (21.66)	UCLA (21.25)	Fordham (20.89)	
1936	Minnesota (23.77)	LSU (22.59)	Pittsburgh (22.28)	Washington (21.34)	Alabama (20.01)	Northwestern (20.87)	Notre Dame (20.18)	Duke (20.04)	Penn (20.00)	Nebraska (19.82)	Duquesne	
1937	Pittsburgh (22.84)	Fordham (22.54)	Dartmouth (22.50)	Alabama (21.97)	Nebraska (21.12)	Yale (21.07)	California (20.82)	LSU (20.75)	Santa Clara (20.36)	Notre Dame (19.85)	Minnesota (19.58)	
1938	Notre Dame (27.72)	Duke (27.10)	Tennessee (26.68)	USC (23.71)	Oklahoma (23.69)	Michigan (23.02)	Minnesota (22.71)	TCU (22.67)	Alabama (22.63)	Carnegie Tech (22.62)	Pittsburgh (22.54)	
1939	USC (25.73)	Texas A&M (25.43)	Cornell (25.26)	Tulane (23.61)	Tennessee (22.97)	Notre Dame (22.59)	Michigan (22.50)	Duke (22.34)	Missouri (22.29)	UCLA (21.91)	Iowa (21.02)	
1940	Minnesota (29.55)	Michigan (26.16)	Stanford (25.84)	Tennessee (25.76)	Texas A&M (25.74)	Penn (24.78)	Mississippi State (24.28)	SMU (23.82)	Texas (23.33)	Nebraska (23.12)	Northwestern (22.51)	
