= 1927 All-Western college football team =

American all-star college football team

The 1927 All-Western college football team consists of American football players selected to the All-Western teams chosen by various selectors for the 1927 college football season.

== All-Western selections ==
=== Ends ===
- Bennie Oosterbaan, Michigan (JC) (CFHOF)
- Waldo A. Fisher, Northwestern (JC)

=== Tackles ===
- Leo Raskowski, Ohio State (JC)
- Mike Gary, Minnesota (JC)

=== Guards ===
- Robert Reitsch, Illinois (JC)
- John "Clipper" Smith, Notre Dame (JC) (CFHOF)

=== Centers ===
- Ken Rouse, Illinois (JC)

=== Quarterbacks ===
- Harold Almquist, Minnesota (JC)

=== Halfbacks ===
- Glenn Presnell, Nebraska (JC)
- Christy Flanagan, Notre Dame (JC)

=== Fullbacks ===
- Herb Joesting, Minnesota (JC) (CFHOF)

== Key ==
JC = Jimmy Corcoran in Chicago Evening American

CFHOF = College Football Hall of Fame

== See also ==
- 1927 College Football All-America Team
- 1927 All-Big Ten Conference football team
