= 1925 All-Western college football team =

American all-star college football team

The 1925 All-Western college football team consists of American football players selected to the All-Western teams chosen by various selectors for the 1925 college football season.

== All-Western selections ==
=== Ends ===
- LaVern Dilweg, Marquette (WE-1)
- Bennie Oosterbaan, Michigan (WE-1) (CFHOF)
- Ted Sloane, Drake (WE-2)
- Chuck Kassel, Illinois (WE-2)
- Elmer A. Lampe, Chicago (WE-3)
- William Flora, Michigan (WE-3)

=== Tackles ===
- Ed Weir, Nebraska (WE-1) (CFHOF)
- Tom Edwards, Michigan (WE-1)
- Fred Henderson, Chicago (WE-2)
- Ed Lindenmeyer, Missouri (WE-2)
- Paul Nelson, Wisconsin (WE-3)
- Harry Hawkins, Michigan (WE-3)

=== Guards ===
- Ed Hess, Ohio State (WE-1)
- Leonard Walsh, Minnesota (WE-1)
- Ray J. Stipek, Wisconsin (WE-2)
- Stan Kuick, Beloit (WE-2)
- John Lovette, Michigan (WE-3)
- Merwin Mitterwallner, Illinois (WE-3)

=== Centers ===
- Harold Hutchison, Nebraska (WE-1)
- Tim Lowry, Northwestern (WE-2)
- Robert J. Brown, Michigan (WE-3)

=== Quarterbacks ===
- Benny Friedman, Michigan (WE-1) (CFHOF/PFHOF)
- Olin Hatfield Chilson, Colorado (WE-2)
- John Schirmer, Iowa (WE-3)

=== Halfbacks ===
- Red Grange, Illinois (WE-1) (CFHOF/PFHOF)
- Doyle Harmon, Wisconsin (WE-1)
- John Rhodes, Nebraska (WE-2)
- Sam Whiteman, Missouri (WE-2)
- Lawrence E. Marks, Indiana (WE-3)
- Marty Karow, Ohio State (WE-3)

=== Fullbacks ===
- Rex Enright, Notre Dame (WE-1)
- Austin McCarty, Chicago (WE-2)
- Loren L. Lewis, Northwestern (WE-3)

== Key ==
WE = Walter Eckersall in the Chicago Tribune

CFHOF = College Football Hall of Fame

PFHOF = Pro Football Hall of Fame

== See also ==
- 1925 College Football All-America Team
- 1925 All-Big Ten Conference football team
- 1925 All-Eastern football team
