= 1990 NFL season =

American football season

Regular season
- Duration: September 9 – December 31, 1990

Playoffs
- Start date: January 5, 1991
- AFC Champions: Buffalo Bills
- NFC Champions: New York Giants

Super Bowl XXV
- Date: January 27, 1991
- Site: Tampa Stadium, Tampa, Florida
- Champions: New York Giants

Pro Bowl
- Date: February 3, 1991
- Site: Aloha Stadium

AFC teams: West, Central, East
NFC teams: West, Central, East

The 1990 NFL season was the 71st regular season of the National Football League (NFL). To increase revenue, the league, for the first time since 1966, reinstated bye weeks, so that all NFL teams would play their 16-game schedule over a 17-week period. Furthermore, the playoff format was expanded from 10 teams to 12 teams by adding another wild card from each conference, thus adding two more contests to the postseason schedule; this format was modified with realignment in 2002 (increasing the division spots per conference from three to four, and decreasing the wild card spots per conference from three to two) before the playoffs expanded to 14 teams in 2020.

During four out of the five previous seasons under the 10-team format, at least one team with a 10–6 record missed the playoffs, including the 11–5 Denver Broncos in 1985; meanwhile, three years later, the 10–6 San Francisco 49ers won Super Bowl XXIII, leading for calls to expand the playoff format to ensure that 10–6 teams could compete for a Super Bowl win. Ironically, the first sixth-seeded playoff team would not have a 10–6 record, but instead, the New Orleans Saints, with an 8–8 record, took the new playoff spot.

The season ended with Super Bowl XXV when the New York Giants defeated the Buffalo Bills 20–19 at Tampa Stadium. This would be the first Super Bowl appearance for Buffalo, who would represent the AFC in the next three Super Bowls as well.

== First full season under NFL Commissioner Tagliabue ==
This was the first full season for Paul Tagliabue as the league's Commissioner, after taking over from Pete Rozelle midway through the previous season. On October 8, the league announced that the Super Bowl Most Valuable Player would be named the Pete Rozelle Trophy in the former commissioner's honor.

== Player movement ==
=== Transactions ===
- On April 2, 1990, Elvis Patterson signed as a Plan B free agent with the Los Angeles Raiders. He was waived on September 3 and later re-signed. He became a special teams standout and earned the nickname Ghost. He was a special teams captain for three years.

=== Trades ===
- On September 25, 1990, the Dallas Cowboys traded Steve Walsh to the New Orleans Saints for the Saint's first and third round picks in the 1991 NFL draft and a second round pick (that could become a first round pick based on performance) in the 1992 NFL draft.

=== Retirements ===
- Dallas Cowboys defensive end Ed "Too Tall" Jones announced his retirement on June 5, 1990.

=== Draft ===
The 1990 NFL draft was held from April 22 to 23, 1990, at New York City's Marriott Marquis. With the first pick, the Indianapolis Colts selected quarterback Jeff George from the University of Illinois. Selecting seventeenth overall, the Dallas Cowboys would draft Emmitt Smith, who would retire as the NFL's all-time leading rusher.

== Officiating changes ==
Dick Jorgensen, who had been the referee in the previous season's Super Bowl XXIV, was diagnosed in May during the offseason with a rare blood disorder. He died five months later on October 10. For the remainder of the 1990 season, NFL officials wore a black armband on their left sleeve with the white number 60 to honor Jorgensen.

Ben Dreith (a referee in the AFL from 1966 to 1969, and the NFL since the merger) and Fred Wyant (a referee since 1971), were demoted to line judge. Dreith later filed a complaint to the Equal Employment Opportunity Commission after the league fired him after the 1990 season, citing age discrimination as the reason for both his demotion to line judge and his dismissal. Dreith and the NFL would later agree in 1993 to a $165,000 settlement, plus court costs and attorney fees.

Gerald Austin, the side judge for Super Bowl XXIV, and Tom White, were promoted to referee. White became the first official to be promoted to referee after only one season of NFL experience since Jerry Markbreit in 1977 (Tommy Bell (1962) and Brad Allen (2014) were hired straight into the NFL as referees). After one season with having 16 officiating crews in 1989, it was reduced back to 15 crews in 1990 to handle the weekly workload of 14 games (if there were no teams with a bye week).

Ed Hochuli was hired as a back judge (now field judge) and assigned to Howard Roe's crew. Hochuli was promoted to referee two years later.

== Major rule changes ==
- The rule for unnecessary roughness penalties is clarified so that any player who butts, spears, or rams an opponent risks immediate disqualification.
- The penalty for an illegal forward pass beyond the line of scrimmage is enforced from the spot where any part of the passer's body is beyond the line when the ball is released.
- The following changes are made to try to speed up the game:
  - the time interval on the Play Clock (the time limit the offensive team has to snap the ball between plays) after time outs and other administrative stoppages has been reduced from 30 seconds to 25 seconds (the time interval between plays remains the same at 45 seconds);
  - whenever a player goes out of bounds, other than in the last two minutes of the first half and the last five minutes of the second half or overtime, the game clock immediately starts when the ball is spotted for the next play and the Referee signals it is ready for play; and
  - other than in the last two minutes of the first half and the last five minutes of the second half or overtime the game clock also starts following all declined penalties.
- This was the first season in which NFL teams officially had a bye week; the last time was in 1966, when the league had an odd number of teams at 15.

== 1990 deaths ==
- Chet Adams, a three-time AAFC champion with the Cleveland Browns died on October 28, 1990
- Fritz Barzilauskas, a first round selection in the 1947 NFL draft died on November 30, 1990
- Former tackle Frank Cope died on October 8, 1990
- Halfback Tom Harmon died on March 15, 1990
- Offensive lineman Rufus Mayes died on January 9
- Darryl Usher, a member of the Phoenix Cardinals in the 1989 NFL season was shot and killed on February 24, 1990, in Phoenix, Arizona at age 25.
- On December 21, 1990, Chicago Bears rookie Fred Washington was killed in a car accident. He was a member of the 1984 Texas 4A State Football Champion Denison YellowJackets and was voted defensive player of the year.

=== Members of the Pro Football Hall of Fame ===
- Football coach George Allen died on December 31.
- Bronko Nagurski, also a member of the College Football Hall of Fame, died on January 7, 1990

== Preseason ==
=== American Bowl ===
A series of National Football League pre-season exhibition games that were held at sites outside the United States, a total of four games were held in 1990.

Date	Winning team	Score	Losing team	Score	Stadium	City
August 5, 1990	Denver Broncos	10	Seattle Seahawks	7	Tokyo Dome	(Japan) Tokyo
August 5, 1990	New Orleans Saints	17	Los Angeles Raiders	10	Wembley Stadium	(United Kingdom) London
August 9, 1990	Pittsburgh Steelers	30	New England Patriots	14	Olympic Stadium	(Canada) Montreal
August 11, 1990	Los Angeles Rams	19	Kansas City Chiefs	3	Olympiastadion	(West Germany) West Berlin

== Regular season ==
=== Scheduling formula ===
Inter-conference
AFC East vs NFC East
AFC Central vs NFC West
AFC West vs NFC Central

Highlights of the 1990 season included:

- Porkchop Bowl: A third game in the heated rivalry between the Dallas Cowboys and Philadelphia Eagles, following the Bounty Bowl of 1989, took place in 1990. Known as the "Porkchop Bowl". The game got its name because Eagles head coach Buddy Ryan choked on a pork chop in the week leading up to the game, Philadelphia won this game as well, 21–20.
- Thanksgiving: Two games were played on Thursday, November 22, featuring Denver at Detroit and Washington at Dallas, with Detroit and Dallas winning.

=== Final standings ===
AFC East
	W	L	T	PCT	DIV	CONF	PF	PA	STK
^{(1)} Buffalo Bills	13	3	0	.813	7–1	10–2	428	263	L1
^{(4)} Miami Dolphins	12	4	0	.750	7–1	10–2	336	242	W1
Indianapolis Colts	7	9	0	.438	3–5	5–7	281	353	L1
New York Jets	6	10	0	.375	2–6	4–10	295	345	W2
New England Patriots	1	15	0	.063	1–7	1–11	181	446	L14

AFC Central
	W	L	T	PCT	DIV	CONF	PF	PA	STK
^{(3)} Cincinnati Bengals	9	7	0	.563	5–1	8–4	360	352	W2
^{(6)} Houston Oilers	9	7	0	.563	4–2	8–4	405	307	W1
Pittsburgh Steelers	9	7	0	.563	2–4	6–6	292	240	L1
Cleveland Browns	3	13	0	.188	1–5	2–10	228	462	L2

AFC West
	W	L	T	PCT	DIV	CONF	PF	PA	STK
^{(2)} Los Angeles Raiders	12	4	0	.750	6–2	9–3	337	268	W5
^{(5)} Kansas City Chiefs	11	5	0	.688	5–3	7–5	369	257	W2
Seattle Seahawks	9	7	0	.563	4–4	7–5	306	286	W2
San Diego Chargers	6	10	0	.375	2–6	5–9	315	281	L3
Denver Broncos	5	11	0	.313	3–5	4–8	331	374	W1

NFC East
	W	L	T	PCT	DIV	CONF	PF	PA	STK
^{(2)} New York Giants	13	3	0	.813	7–1	10–2	335	211	W2
^{(4)} Philadelphia Eagles	10	6	0	.625	5–3	9–3	396	299	W3
^{(5)} Washington Redskins	10	6	0	.625	4–4	7–5	381	301	W1
Dallas Cowboys	7	9	0	.438	2–6	6–8	244	308	L2
Phoenix Cardinals	5	11	0	.313	2–6	3–9	268	396	L3

NFC Central
	W	L	T	PCT	DIV	CONF	PF	PA	STK
^{(3)} Chicago Bears	11	5	0	.688	6–2	9–3	348	280	L1
Tampa Bay Buccaneers	6	10	0	.375	5–3	6–8	264	367	L2
Detroit Lions	6	10	0	.375	3–5	5–7	373	413	L1
Green Bay Packers	6	10	0	.375	3–5	5–7	271	347	L5
Minnesota Vikings	6	10	0	.375	3–5	4–8	351	326	L4

NFC West
	W	L	T	PCT	DIV	CONF	PF	PA	STK
^{(1)} San Francisco 49ers	14	2	0	.875	4–2	10–2	353	239	W1
^{(6)} New Orleans Saints	8	8	0	.500	4–2	6–6	274	275	W2
Los Angeles Rams	5	11	0	.313	2–4	3–9	345	412	L4
Atlanta Falcons	5	11	0	.313	2–4	3–9	348	365	W2

=== Tiebreakers ===
- Cincinnati finished ahead of Houston and Pittsburgh in the AFC Central based on best head-to-head record (3–1 to Oilers' 2–2 to Steelers' 1–3).
- Houston was the third AFC Wild Card based on better conference record (8–4) than Seattle (7–5) and Pittsburgh (6–6).
- Philadelphia finished ahead of Washington in the NFC East based on better division record (5–3 to Redskins' 4–4).
- Tampa Bay was second in NFC Central based on best head-to-head record (5–1) against Detroit (2–4), Green Bay (3–3), and Minnesota (2–4).
- Detroit finished third in the NFC Central based on best net division points (minus 8) against Green Bay (minus 40).
- Green Bay finished ahead of Minnesota in the NFC Central based on better conference record (5–7 to Vikings' 4–8).
- The L.A. Rams finished ahead of Atlanta in the NFC West based on net points in division (plus 1 to Falcons' minus 31).

== Playoffs ==
Jan 6 – Riverfront Stadium	Jan 13 – Los Angeles Memorial Coliseum
6	Houston	14
3	Cincinnati	10
3	Cincinnati	41	Jan 20 – Rich Stadium
2	LA Raiders	20
AFC
Jan 5 – Joe Robbie Stadium	2	LA Raiders	3
Jan 12 – Rich Stadium
1	Buffalo	51
5	Kansas City	16	AFC Championship
4	Miami	34
4	Miami	17	Jan 27 – Tampa Stadium
1	Buffalo	44
Wild-card round
Divisional round
Jan 6 – Soldier Field	A1	Buffalo	19
Jan 13 – Giants Stadium
N2	NY Giants	20
6	New Orleans	6	Super Bowl XXV
3	Chicago	3
3	Chicago	16	Jan 20 – Candlestick Park
2	NY Giants	31
NFC
Jan 5 – Veterans Stadium	2	NY Giants	15
Jan 12 – Candlestick Park
1	San Francisco	13
5	Washington	20	NFC Championship
5	Washington	10
4	Philadelphia	6
1	San Francisco	28

== Notable events ==
- For the first time in NFL history, two teams (the 49ers and the Giants) would start the season 10–0. This would not be equalled until 2009 when the Colts and the Saints both reached 13–0, and was also equalled in 2015 by the Panthers and Patriots.

== Records, milestones, and notable statistics ==
Week 3

- September 24, 1990 – Thurman Thomas of the Buffalo Bills rushed for 214 yards versus the New York Jets. It was the second highest total in the history of Monday Night Football.

Week 6

- October 14, 1990 – Joe Montana set a 49ers record by throwing for 476 yards in one game and throwing six touchdown passes. Jerry Rice set a 49ers record with 5 touchdown receptions and 30 points in one game.
- October 14, 1990 - Barry Word of the Kansas City Chiefs rushes for a team-record 200 yards against the Detroit Lions at Arrowhead. Kansas City won 43–24.

Week 10

- November 11, 1990: Derrick Thomas set the NFL single game record of seven quarterback sacks, a feat which occurred against Seattle's Dave Krieg on 1990 Veterans Day. Despite this feat, Krieg eluded a blitzing Thomas on the game's last play and threw a touchdown pass to Paul Skansi, which gave the Seahawks a 17–16 win, their first at Arrowhead Stadium since 1980. The record came close to being matched with three occasions of players reaching six sacks, once by Thomas himself in 1998.

Week 15

- December 16, 1990: Warren Moon threw for 527 yards against Kansas City on December 16, 1990, the second-most passing yards ever in a single game.

== Statistical leaders ==
=== Team ===
Points scored	Buffalo Bills (428)
Total yards gained	Houston Oilers (6,222)
Yards rushing	Philadelphia Eagles (2,556)
Yards passing	Houston Oilers (4,805)
Fewest points allowed	New York Giants (211)
Fewest total yards allowed	Pittsburgh Steelers (4,115)
Fewest rushing yards allowed	Philadelphia Eagles (1,169)
Fewest passing yards allowed	Pittsburgh Steelers (2,500)

== Awards ==
Most Valuable Player	Joe Montana, quarterback, San Francisco
Coach of the Year	Jimmy Johnson, Dallas
Offensive Player of the Year	Warren Moon, quarterback, Houston Oilers
Defensive Player of the Year	Bruce Smith, defensive end, Buffalo
Offensive Rookie of the Year	Emmitt Smith, running back, Dallas
Defensive Rookie of the Year	Mark Carrier, safety, Chicago
NFL Man of the Year	Mike Singletary, linebacker, Chicago
NFL Comeback Player of the Year	Barry Word, running back, Kansas City
Super Bowl Most Valuable Player	Ottis Anderson, running back, NY Giants

== Coaching changes ==
=== Offseason ===
- Atlanta Falcons: Jerry Glanville was named the permanent replacement, after Marion Campbell was fired after the first 12 games of 1989, and Jim Hanifan served as interim for the final four games.
- Houston Oilers: Jack Pardee replaced Jerry Glanville.
- Los Angeles Raiders: Art Shell became the permanent head coach. Shell served as interim for the last 12 games in 1989 after Mike Shanahan was fired after the first four.
- New England Patriots: Rod Rust replaced the fired Raymond Berry.
- New York Jets: Bruce Coslet replaced the fired Joe Walton.
- Phoenix Cardinals: Joe Bugel was named the permanent replacement, after Gene Stallings was fired after the first 11 games of 1989, and Hank Kuhlmann served as interim for the final five games.

=== In-season ===
- Cleveland Browns: Bud Carson was fired after nine games, and Jim Shofner served as interim for the final seven games.
- Tampa Bay Buccaneers: Ray Perkins was fired after 13 games, and Richard Williamson served as interim for the final three games.

== Stadium changes ==
With New England Patriots founder Billy Sullivan no longer owning the team, having it sold to Victor Kiam in 1988 and Sullivan Stadium being taken over by Robert Kraft, the venue was renamed Foxboro Stadium.

== Uniforms changes ==
=== Individual teams ===
- The Atlanta Falcons unveiled new uniforms, switching both their primary jerseys and helmets from red to black. This was the first time the Falcons wore black jerseys since 1970, and the first time they had ever worn black helmets.
- The New York Jets added black trim to their logo, numbers, and stripes on their pants, and changed their face masks from white to black. They also added green pants to be worn with their white jerseys. The Jets wore their 1978-89 uniforms in the preseason.
- The Phoenix Cardinals began wearing red pants with their white jerseys on orders from coach Joe Bugel, who wanted to emulate the Washington Redskins' look of white jerseys and burgundy pants. This was the first time since 1960 (the Cardinals' first season in St. Louis) the team wore pants colored other than white.
- The San Diego Chargers began wearing navy pants with their white jerseys, the first time they wore pants which were not white or gold.

In Week 16 with the Gulf War looming closer, American flag decals were added to the back of the helmets of all players.

== Deaths ==
=== January ===
- January 3- Roy Ilowit, age 72. Played four games at guard for the Brooklyn Dodgers in 1937.
- January 4- Ed Ecker, age 66. NFL career spanned from 1947 to 1952, in which he appeared as an offensive and defensive tackle for the Chicago Bears, Chicago Rockets, Green Bay Packers, and Washington Redskins.
- January 7- Bronko Nagurski, age 81. Running back for the Chicago Bears from 1930 to 1937, came out of retirement in 1943. Elected to pro football hall of fame in 1963..
- January 9- Don Dimmick, age 86. Played halfback for the Buffalo Rangers in 1926.
  - Jim Gillette, age 72. Running back for the Cleveland Rams, Boston Yanks, Green Bay Packers, and Detroit Lions whose NFL career was interrupted due to military service in World War II.
    - Rufus Mayes, age 42. Former first round pick of the Chicago Bears, long time starting tackle for the Cincinnati Bengals.
- January 10- Ralph Hutchinson, age 65. Played one season at guard for the New York Giants after being selected in the 8th round of the 1946 NFL draft.
- January 15- Fred Mundee, age 76. Played Linebacker and center for the Chicago Bears from 1943 to 1945 as a wartime replacement player.
- January 16- Clarence Janecek, age 78. Played one season in the NFL, starting 11 games at guard for the Pittsburgh Steelers in 1933.
- January 17- Larry Todd, age 47. Played running back for the Oakland Raiders from 1965 to 1970.
- January 18- Fred Denfeld, age 91. Played offensive tackle for the Rock Island Independents and Duluth Kelleys in 1921 and 1925.
- January 19- George Gulyanics, age 68. Former running back and punter for the Chicago Bears from 1947 to 1952.
- January 20- Fred Venturelli, age 72. Played one season as a placekicker in the NFL, for the Chicago Bears, making the team as a 31 year old rookie.
- January 21- Jim Russell, age 81. Played guard for the Philadelphia Eagles from 1936 to 1937.
- January 25- Andy Puplis, age 74. Played defensive back for the Chicago Cardinals in 1943 as a wartime replacement player.
- January 29- Stan Batinski, age 72. Played offensive guard and tackle for the Detroit Lions, Boston Yanks and New York Yankees from 1941 to 1949.
- January 30- Bob Fosdick, age 95. Played guard and tackle for the Minneapolis Marines in 1923.
- January 31- Homer Griffith, age 77. Played running back for the Chicago Cardinals in 1934.

=== February ===
- February 6- Lew Erber, age 55. Offensive coordinator for the New England Patriots from 1982 to 1986. Also coached running backs and wide receivers for the Oakland Raiders from 1976 to 1981, Los Angeles Rams from 1985 to 1986. Also was the offensive coordinator for the Los Angeles Cobras of the Arena Football League in 1988.
- February 8- Pete Kmetovic, age 70. Halfback who was selected by the Philadelphia Eagles in the first round of the 1942 NFL draft, did not play in the NFL until 1946 due to military service during World War Two.
- February 15- George Daney, age 43. Played offensive guard for the Kansas City Chiefs from 1968 to 1974, was a reserve on the Chiefs team that won Super Bowl IV.
- February 21- Lindy Mayhew, age 82. Played guard for the Pittsburgh Steelers from 1936 to 1938.
- February 24- Darryl Usher, age 25. Drafted by the New England Patriots as a wide receiver in the seventh round of the 1988 NFL draft, was released in camp and split time between the San Diego Chargers and Phoenix Cardinals in 1989.
- February 28- Bob Armstrong, age 81. Former offensive lineman for the Portsmouth Spartans from 1931 to 1932.

=== March ===
- March 4- Frank McGrath, age 85. Played Defensive End for the Frankford Yellow Jackets and New York Yankees from 1927 to 1928.
- March 5- Vince Commisa, age 68. Played one season at guard for the Boston Yanks in 1944 as a wartime replacement player.
- March 6- Julian Spence, age 60. Played defensive back for and was an original member of the Houston Oilers. Also played for the Chicago Cardinals and San Francisco 49ers.
- March 9- Lou Vedder, age 92. Played one season for the Buffalo Bisons in 1927.
- March 12- Rick Lackman, age 79. Played Running Back for the Philadelphia Eagles from 1933 to 1935.
- March 15- Paul Berezney, age 74. Played offensive tackle from 1942 to 1946 from the Green Bay Packers and Miami Seahawks.
  - Mike Witteck, age 26. Crossed the picket line to play for the New York Jets in 1987 during the players strike.
- March 16- Barry French, age 68. Played Offensive tackle for the Baltimore Colts and Detroit Lions from 1947 to 1951.
- March 20- Gar Leaf, age 87. Played Offensive Tackle for the Louisville Colonels in 1926.
- March 23- Ainer Cleve, age 92. Played in the NFL as a tail back for the Minneapolis Marines from 1921 to 1924.
- March 25- A.D. Williams, age 56. Wide receiver who played three years in the NFL (1959-1961) for three different teams: Green Bay Packers, Cleveland Browns, and Minnesota Vikings.
- March 31- Saxon Judd, age 70. Played receiver for the Brooklyn Dodgers of the All-America Football Conference from 1946 to 1948.
  - Ed Rate, aged 90. NFL career consisted of one game for the Milwaukee Badgers in 1923.

=== April ===
- April 1- Vince Pacewic, age 69. Played receiver for the Washington Redskins in 1943. Returned to team in 1947 after completion of military service.
- April 8- Tom Roberts, age 74. Played offensive guard from 1943 to 1945 for the New York Giants and Chicago Bears.
- April 9- Bill Bailey, age 73. Played both offensive and defensive end for the Brooklyn Dodgers from 1940 to 1941.
- April 17- Jim Eiden, age 88. Eiden's NFL career consisted of one game starting at tackle for the Louisville Colonels in 1926.
- April 27- Chuck Weimer, age 85. Played tailback and place kicker for the Buffalo Bisons, Brooklyn Dodgers, and Cleveland Indians from 1929 to 1931.
- April 29- Jake Fawcett, age 70 Played offensive guard for the Los Angeles Rams and Brooklyn Dodgers.
- April 30- Charley Ewart, age 74. Head coach for the New York Bulldogs in 1949, leading the team to a 1-10-1 record in his only season as an NFL head coach.

=== May ===
- May 3- George Wilson, Jr, age 84. Played one season at defensive back for the Frankford Yellow Jackets in 1929.
- May 5- Karl Thielscher, age 95. NFL career consisted of one game at fullback for the Buffalo All Americans in 1920.
- May 6- Paul Blessing, age 71. Played one season as an end, 1944, as a wartime replacement player for the Detroit Lions
- May 8- June James, age 27. Played one season for the Detroit Lions at linebacker after being selected in the 1985 NFL draft. Played for the Indianapolis Colts during the 1987 NFLPA players strike.
- May 9- Ralph Maillard, age 84. Played one season at tackle for the Chicago Bears in 1929.
- May 10- Walter Mahan, age 87. NFL career consisted of one game at guard for the Frankford Yellow Jackets in 1926.
- May 13- Ray Jenison, age 80. Played one season (1931) in the NFL at tackle for the Green Bay Packers.
- May 17- Jimmy Lawrence, age 77. Playing wing Back for the Chicago Cardinals and Green Bay Packers from 1936 to 1939.
- May 19- Bernie Lee, age 77. Played quarterback in the NFL for the Philadelphia Eagles and Pittsburgh Steelers in 1938.

=== June ===
- June 21- Tony Sarausky, age 77. Played running back for the New York Giants and Brooklyn Dodgers from 1935 to 1938.
- June 25- Bob Garner, age 55. Played Defensive back for the Los Angeles Chargers and Oakland Raiders of the American Football League from 1960 to 1962.
- June 26- Carroll Ringwalt, age 82. Played center and guard for the Portsmouth Spartans and Frankford Yellow Jackets from 1930 to 1931.
- June 28- Bernie Winkler, age 64. Played Offensive tackle for the Los Angeles Dons of the All-America Football Conference.

=== July ===
- July 3- Potsy Jones, age 80. Played guard for the Minneapolis Red Jackets, Frankford Yellow Jackets, New York Giants and Green Bay Packers from 1930 to 1938.
- July 7- Ben Ciccone, age 80. Played center for the Pittsburgh Steelers from 1934 to 1935, and returned to play for the Chicago Cardinals in 1942.
- July 11- Joe Watts, age 75. Played Tackle for the Washington Redskins in 1945. Voted to pro bowl in only NFL season.
- July 13- Harry Seltzer, age 71. Played running back for the Detroit Lions in 1942.
- July 15- Jay Hornbeak, age 78. Played running back for the Brooklyn Dodgers
  - Joe Ungerer, age 73. Played tackle for the Washington Redskins from 1943 to 1944. Drafted by the Brooklyn Dodgers in the 1941 NFL draft.

=== August ===
- August 1- Carl Ekern, age 36. Former pro-bowl linebacker for the Los Angeles Rams.
  - Chet Pudloski, age 74. Started ten games at tackle for the Cleveland Rams in 1944.
- August 3- Jeff Modesitt, age 26. Played one game in the NFL for the Tampa Bay Buccaneers as a replacement player during the 1987 Players strike.
- August 8- Walt Williams, age 71. Two way player who played defensive back and running back for the Chicago Rockets and Boston Yanks from 1946 to 1947.
- August 9- Art Van Tone, age 71. Played running back for the Detroit Lions from 1943 to 1945, and finished his career with the Brooklyn Dodgers in 1946.
- August 12- Paul Cuba, age 82. Played tackle for the Philadelphia Eagles from 1933 to 1935.
- August 16- Bobby Gordon, age 54. Played defensive back for the Chicago Cardinals and Houston Oilers from 1958 to 1960.
- August 17- Larry Weldon, age 75. Reserve quarterback for the Washington Redskins who also played place kicker from 1944 to 1945.
- August 20- Wiley Feagin, age 52. Played offensive guard for the Baltimore Colts and Washington Redskins from 1961 to 1963.
  - Ray Johnson, age 75. Played running back and defensive back for the Cleveland Rams and Chicago Cardinals from 1937 to 1940.
- August 21- Larry Buhler, age 73. Played three seasons (1939-1941) at running back for the Green Bay Packers. Was the Packers first round pick in the 1939 NFL draft.
- August 25- Bernie Feibish, age 71. Played center in the NFL for Philadelphia Eagles for three games in 1941.
- August 26- Tom Toner, age 40. Played linebacker for the Green Bay Packers from 1973 to 1977.
- August 28- Ed Balatti, age 66. Played receiver for the San Francisco 49ers, New York Yankees, and Buffalo Bills of the All-America Football Conference.

=== September ===
- September 3- Ernie Hambacher, age 83. Played running back for the Orange Tornadoes in 1929.
- September 5- Charlie Huneke, age 69. Played tackle for the Chicago Rockets of the All-America Football Conference and the Brooklyn Dodgers from 1946 to 1948.
  - John Naioti, age 68. Played running back for the Pittsburgh Steelers in 1942 and 1945.
- September 11- Byron Eby, age 85. Played one season for the Portsmouth Spartans in 1930.
- September 17- Joe Maras, age 74. Played guard for the Pittsburgh Steelers from 1938 to 1940. Originally drafted by the Cleveland Rams in the 10th round of the 1938 NFL draft.
- September 20- Ed Robnett, age 70. Played Defensive end for the San Francisco 49ers in 1947. Originally drafted by the Washington Redskins in the 18th round of the 1946 NFL draft.
- September 21- Frank Quillen, age 69. Played two seasons as Defensive end for the Chicago Rockets of the All-America Football Conference from 1946 to 1947.
- September 22- Len Szafaryn, age 62. Played seven seasons in the NFL as a linebacker/offensive tackle. Played for the Washington Redskins, Green Bay Packers, and Philadelphia Eagles.
- September 30- Al Lolotai, age 70. Played guard for the Washington Redskins and the Los Angeles Dons from 1945 to 1949.

=== October ===
- October 1- Tommy Thompson, age 63. Played center and linebacker for the Cleveland Browns from 1949 to 1953.
- October 8- Frank Cope, age 74. Played Offensive Guard for the New York Giants from 1938 to 1947.
- October 11- George Corbett, age 82. Played tailback for the Chicago Bears from 1932 to 1938.
- October 22 Frank Sinkwich, age 70. Running back who was the first round draft choice of the Detroit Lions in the 1943 NFL draft. Missed two years due to military service.
- October 25- Ed Bagdon, age 64. Played middle guard, linebacker, and place kicker for the Chicago Cardinals and Washington Redskins from 1950 to 1952.
- October 27- Garvin Mugg, age 69. Played three games at tackle for the Detroit Lions in 1943 as a wartime replacement player.
- October 28- Chet Adams, age 75. Former Offensive and Defensive tackle for the Cleveland Rams, Green Bay Packers, Cleveland Browns Buffalo Bills and New York Yankees.

=== November ===
- November 15- Robert Patton, age 63, Played guard for the New York Giants in 1952.
- November 26- Dick Folk, age 75. Played running back for Brooklyn Dodgers in 1939.
- November 30- Fritz Barzilauskas, age 70. Played guard for the Boston Yanks, New York Yankees, and New York Giants.
  - Richard Brown, age 83. Played one season at center for the Portsmouth Spartans in 1930.

=== December ===
- December 3- Ray Wagner, age 88. Played Defensive end for the Orange Tornadoes and Brooklyn Dodgers from 1929 to 1931.
- December 4- Nels Peterson, age 77. Played running back and placekicker for the Cleveland Rams and Washington Redskins from 19337 to 1938.
- December 6- Ed Bell, Age 69. Played offensive line for the Miami Seahawks and Green Bay Packers from 1946 to 1949.
  - Remi Prudhomme, age 48, Played center and defensive end for the Buffalo Bills, Kansas City Chiefs, and New Orleans Saints from 1966 to 1972. Played for Kansas City in Super Bowl IV.
- December 16- Art Koeninger, age 84.From 1931 to 1933, played center for three teams, the Frankford Yellow Jackets, Staten Island Stapletons, and Philadelphia Eagles.
- December 19- Billy Tidwell, age 60. Played one season at running back in the NFL, for the San Francisco 49ers after being drafted by the 49ers in the 1953 NFL draft.
- December 20- Mark Temple, age 79. Played one season in the NFL at Tailback, splitting the 1936 season between the Boston Redskins and Brooklyn Dodgers.
- December 21- Fred Washington, age 23. Played Defensive Tackle for the Chicago Bears, Killed in a car accident during his rookie season.
- December 29- Jack Nix, age 73. NFL career consisted of one game at Wing Back for the Cleveland Rams in 1940.
- December 31- George Allen, age 72. Hall of fame head coach for the Los Angeles Rams and Washington Redskins.
  - Ewell Phillips, age 81. Played offensive guard for the New York Giants in 1936.

== Television changes ==
This was the first season under a new four-year deal with TNT to televise Sunday night football games during the first half of the season. ABC, CBS, NBC, and ESPN also each signed four-year contracts to renew their rights for Monday Night Football, the NFC package, and the AFC package, and Sunday Night Football during the second half of the season, respectively. ABC was also given the rights to televise the additional Saturday AFC and NFC wild card playoff games.

TNT's initial broadcast team consisted of Skip Caray on play-by-play and Pat Haden as color commentator. Fred Hickman became the host of TNT's pregame show, The Stadium Show. ESPN continued to air NFL Primetime during those Sunday nights when TNT aired games, going head-to-head with TNT's pregame show.

After CBS fired Brent Musburger on April 1, 1990, the network decided to overhaul the talent lineup on The NFL Today. Irv Cross was demoted to the position of game analyst, Dick Butkus returned to acting, and Will McDonough moved on to NBC's NFL Live!. Greg Gumbel became the new host of The NFL Today. Terry Bradshaw became the new analyst, while Pat O'Brien, Lesley Visser, and Jim Gray as the new reporters/contributors.

Late in the 1990 season, Pat Summerall was hospitalized with a bleeding ulcer after vomiting on a plane following his calling a Chicago Bears-Washington Redskins game and would not return to the booth until the 1990 NFC Divisional Playoff Game between the Bears and New York Giants. In Summerall's absence, CBS teamed John Madden with Dick Stockton for one week before teaming him with Verne Lundquist until Summerall was well enough to work, while Jack Buck, the lead voice of NFL coverage on CBS Radio and CBS' Major League Baseball coverage, was added as a fill-in broadcaster.
