= 1926 All-Big Ten Conference football team =

American college football all-star team

The 1926 All-Big Ten Conference football team consists of American football players selected to the All-Big Ten Conference teams chosen by various selectors for the 1926 Big Ten Conference football season. Herb Joesting and Bennie Oosterbaan were the only two players chosen unanimously in the Associated Press poll of conference coaches.

== All Big-Ten selections ==
=== Ends ===
- Bennie Oosterbaan, Michigan (AP-1; UP-1; BE-1; WE-1)
- Roger B. Wheeler, Minnesota (AP-1; UP-2; BE-1; WE-1)
- William Flora, Michigan (AP-2; UP-1; BE-3)
- Chuck Kassel, Illinois (AP-2, UP-3)
- Jefferson Burrus, Wisconsin (UP-2; BE-2)
- Waldo A. Fisher, Northwestern (UP-3; BE-2)
- Laurie Apitz, Chicago (BE-3)

=== Tackles ===
- Spike Nelson, Iowa (AP-1; UP-2; BE-1)
- Leo Raskowski, Ohio State (AP-2; UP-1; BE-2; WE-1)
- Robert W. Johnson, Northwestern (UP-2; BE-1; UP-2 [tackle]; WE-1)
- Mike Gary, Minnesota (AP-1; UP-3; BE-3)
- Ray Baer, Michigan (AP-2; UP-3; BE-2)
- Leo R. Uridil, Ohio State (BE-3)

=== Guards ===
- Ed Hess, Ohio State (AP-1; UP-1; BE-1; WE-1)
- Bernie Shively, Illinois (AP-1; UP-2; BE-1; WE-1)
- Hal Hanson, Minnesota (AP-2; UP-1 [tackle]; BE-2)
- Bart, Northwestern (UP-1)
- John Lovette, Michigan (AP-2; UP-3; BE-2)
- Louis A. Briner, Indiana (UP-3)
- Theodore R. Meyer, Ohio State (BE-3)
- A. L. Spencer, Purdue (BE-3)

=== Centers ===
- Robert Reitsch, Illinois (AP-1; UP-1; BE-2; WE-1)
- Alex Klein, Ohio State (AP-2; UP-2; BE-1)
- Ken Rouse, Chicago (UP-3; BE-3)

=== Quarterbacks ===
- Benny Friedman, Michigan (AP-1; UP-1; BE-1 WE-1)
- Harold Almquist, Minnesota (AP-2; BE-2)
- Franklin B. Lanum, Illinois (UP-2)
- Algy Clark, Ohio State (UP-3; BE-3)

=== Halfbacks ===
- Ralph Baker, Northwestern (AP-1; UP-1; BE-1; WE-1)
- Marty Karow, Ohio State (AP-1; UP-1; BE-2 [as fb]; WE-1)
- Nick Kutsch, Iowa (AP-2; UP-2; BE-3)
- Chester "Cotton" Wilcox, Purdue (AP-2; UP-2; BE-1)
- Louis Gilbert, Michigan (UP-3; BE-2)
- Byron Eby, Ohio State (UP-3)
- Vic Gustafson, Northwestern (BE-3)

=== Fullbacks ===
- Herb Joesting, Minnesota (AP-1; UP-1; BE-1; WE-1)
- Tiny Lewis, Northwestern (AP-2; UP-2; BE-3)
- Russell Daugherity, Illinois (UP-3; BE-2 [as hb])

== Key ==
AP = Associated Press

UP = United Press

BE = Billy Evans

WE = Walter Eckersall

Bold = Consensus first-team selection by majority of the selectors listed above

== See also ==
- 1926 College Football All-America Team
