= Tiny Lewis =

American football player (1906–1955)

Profile
- Position: Back

Personal information
- Born: October 18, 1906; Foosland, Illinois, U.S.
- Died: January 16, 1955 (aged 48); Michigan City, Indiana, U.S.
- Listed height: 6 ft 2 in (1.88 m)
- Listed weight: 210 lb (95 kg)

Career information
- High school: Carlinville (IL)
- College: Northwestern

Career history
- Portsmouth Spartans (1930); Cleveland Indians (1931)

Awards and highlights
- First-team All-Big Ten (1925); 2× Second-team All-Big Ten (1926, 1927)
- Stats at Pro Football Reference

Loren Leland "Tiny" Lewis (October 18, 1906 – January 16, 1955) was an American football player.

Lewis was born in 1906 in Foosland, Illinois. He attended Carlinville High School in Carlinville, Illinois. He played college football as a fullback for the Northwestern Wildcats from 1925 to 1927. In 1925, he kicked a field goal to give Northwestern a 3-2 victory over Michigan, the only points given up by Michigan during the 1925 season. In 1926, he helped lead the Wildcats to the Big Ten football championship. He also competed in track at Northwestern and won the Big Ten championship in 1927 in the shot put.

Lewis played professional football in the National Football League (NFL) as a back for the Portsmouth Spartans in 1930 and the Cleveland Indians in 1931. He appeared in 14 NFL games, seven as a starter. While playing with Portsmouth, he scored two touchdowns and kicked 10 extra points for 22 points scored.

Lewis and his wife died in a fire at his home in Michigan City, Indiana, in 1955. The fire resulted when Lewis fell asleep while smoking.
