= Hal Hanson (American football, born 1905) =

American football player (1905–1977)

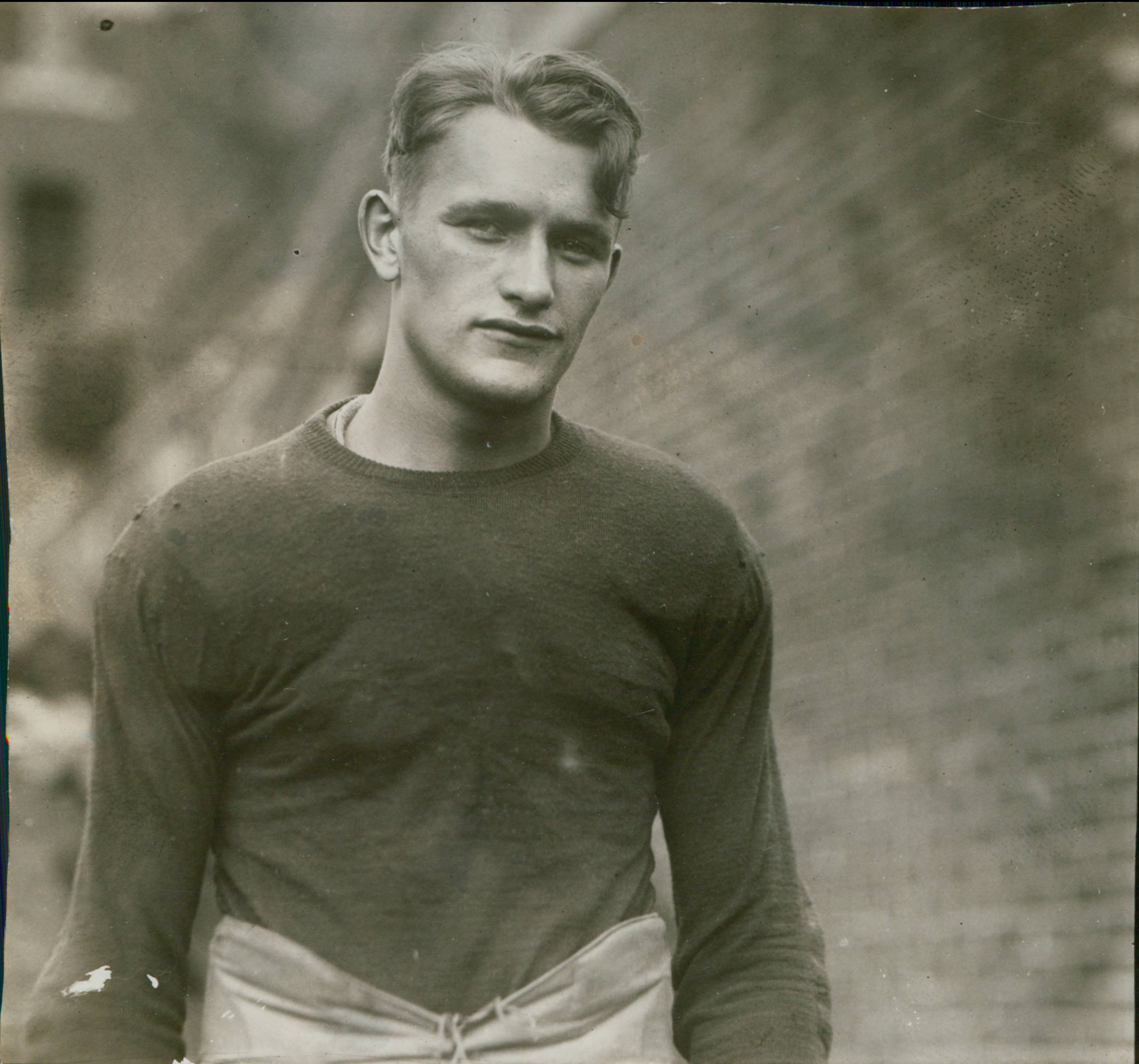

No. 20
- Position: Guard

Personal information
- Born: August 10, 1905; Stewart, Minnesota, U.S.
- Died: September 29, 1977 (aged 72); Wright County, Minnesota, U.S.

Career information
- High school: Stewart
- College: Minnesota

Career history
- Frankford Yellow Jackets (1928–1930); Minneapolis Red Jackets (1930)

Awards and highlights
- First-team All-American (1927); 2× First-team All-Big Ten (1926, 1927)
- Stats at Pro Football Reference

Harold Walter Hanson (August 10, 1905 – September 29, 1977) was an American football guard. He played college football for the Minnesota Golden Gophers from 1925 to 1927, winning All-America honors in 1927. He was one of eleven players selected to Minnesota's all-century team in 1949. He also played for the Frankford Yellow Jackets of the National Football League (NFL) from 1928 to 1930, appearing in a total of 51 NFL games.

== Early life ==
Hanson was born in 1905 in Stewart, Minnesota. He attended Stewart High School. He played on Stewart's basketball team that won the state championship.

== University of Minnesota ==
Hanson enrolled at the University of Minnesota where he played college football for the Minnesota Golden Gophers from 1925 to 1927. He began as a backfield player but was shifted to guard by head coach Clarence Spears in 1925. After watching Hanson play against Notre Dame, Knute Rockne called Hanson the best guard in the west. As a junior in 1926, Hanson received first-team honors from the United Press on the 1926 All-Big Ten Conference football team.

As a senior, Hanson was a member of the undefeated 1927 Minnesota team that won the Big Ten Conference championship. He was regarded as "the best guard ever turned out at Minnesota." Columnist George A. Barton of The Minneapolis Morning Tribune wrote of Hanson:

Hanson is the perfect guard, weighing 190 pounds, tremendously strong and is remarkably fast and active for a big fellow. Not only that but the husky young man . . . is a smart football player. Offensively, he was a wonder at opening holes for the backs while on the defensive he had a habit of charging through the opposing line with such speed and ferocity that he frequently broke up plays in the making.

After the 1927 season, he received first-team All-America honors from the United Press, Bill Roper for the North American Newspaper Alliance, and Lawrence Perry.

Hanson completed his course of study in pharmacy in the spring of 1928 and passed his state board examination.

Hanson later expressed skepticism as to the benefit of college athletics: "The college athlete is physically overworked, without adequate time for study, under a great mental strain harmful to his nerves, injured in character by publicity which makes him king for a day, and exploited for the financial benefit of the school."

== Professional football ==
After completing his studies at Minnesota, Hanson worked through the summer with a construction company. In the fall of 1928, he joined the Frankford Yellow Jackets of the National Football League (NFL). He started all 16 games at guard for Frankford in 1928, helping to lead the team to an 11–3–2 record in NFL games, second best in the league. He continued to play for Frankford, appearing in 18 games for the 1929 team compiled a 10–4–5 record in NFL games. In 1930, Frankford fell from the upper ranks of the NFL, but Hanson remained a stalwart, appearing in 16 games. At the end of the 1930 season, Hanson returned to Minnesota, appearing in one game for the 1930 Minneapolis Red Jackets. Over three seasons, Hanson appeared in 51 NFL games, 44 as a starter.

Hanson also appeared with Cully Lidberg's all-stars in the fall of 1931.

== Legacy and later years ==
Even in 1946, Hanson was still cited by many as "the football players' player and the best guard Minnesota ever had." His proponents cited his "lightning speed, the pig iron impact, the intense concentration, the competitive fury and the calculating cunning which made Hanson what he was."

In 1949, Dick Cullum of the Minneapolis Tribune picked Hanson as one of eleven players on his Minnesota "team of the century". Cullum said that Hanson's "mates and opponents of his time agree that Harold Hanson in 1925–27 was the most merciless and destructive guard they have ever known", with "a shattering quality in his blocking and tackling that made brave men wince."

In 1928, Hanson moved to Mora, Minnesota, where he set up a pharmacy business and worked as a druggist. He became vice president of the Minnesota pharmaceutical association and was active in the Mora businessmen's association. Hanson died in 1977 at Mora at age 72.
