= Bernie Shively =

American football player and coach, college athletics administrator

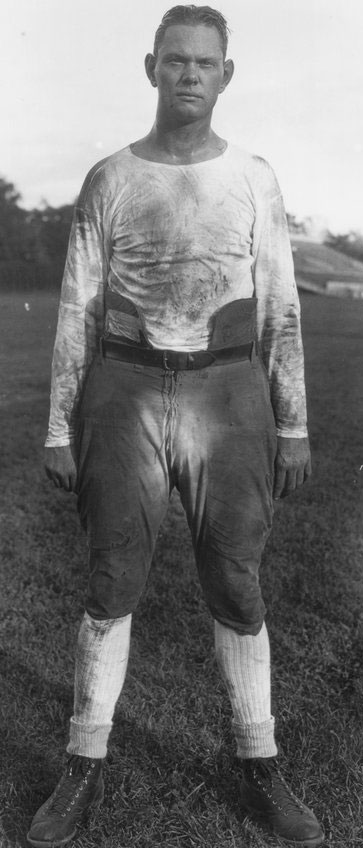
- Shively in 1929

Biographical details
- Born: May 26, 1902; Paris, Illinois, U.S.
- Died: December 10, 1967 (aged 65); Lexington, Kentucky, U.S.

Playing career
- 1924–1926: Illinois
- Position: Guard

Coaching career (HC unless noted)
- 1927–1933: Kentucky (line)
- 1945: Kentucky

Administrative career (AD unless noted)
- 1938–1967: Kentucky

Head coaching record
- Overall: 2–8

Accomplishments and honors

Awards
- Consensus All-American (1926); 2× First-team All-Big Ten (1925, 1926)
- College Football Hall of Fame; Inducted in 1982 (profile)

Bernie A. Shively (May 26, 1902 – December 10, 1967) was an American college football player, coach, and college athletics administrator. He was the athletic director at the University of Kentucky from 1938 until his death.

Shively served as an assistant football coach at Kentucky and was interim head football coach in 1945, prior to hiring Bear Bryant. Shively was linked to a scholarship scandal in 1962 involving the infamous football team known as the Thin Thirty, coached by Charlie Bradshaw.

Shively attended the University of Illinois. where he played football as a guard alongside Red Grange. He was a consensus All-American in 1926. He is a member of the College Football Hall of Fame, and is honored at Kentucky as the namesake of the track and field stadium.

Shively died on December 10, 1967, at Saint Joseph Hospital in Lexington, Kentucky.

== Head coaching record ==
| Year | Team | Overall | Conference | Standing | Bowl/playoffs |
|---|---|---|---|---|---|
Kentucky Wildcats (Southeastern Conference) (1945)
| 1945 | Kentucky | 2–8 | 0–5 | 12th | |
| Kentucky: | | 2–8 | 0–5 | | |
| Total: | | 2–8 | | | |
