= Chicago Tribune Silver Football =

Big Ten Conference college football award

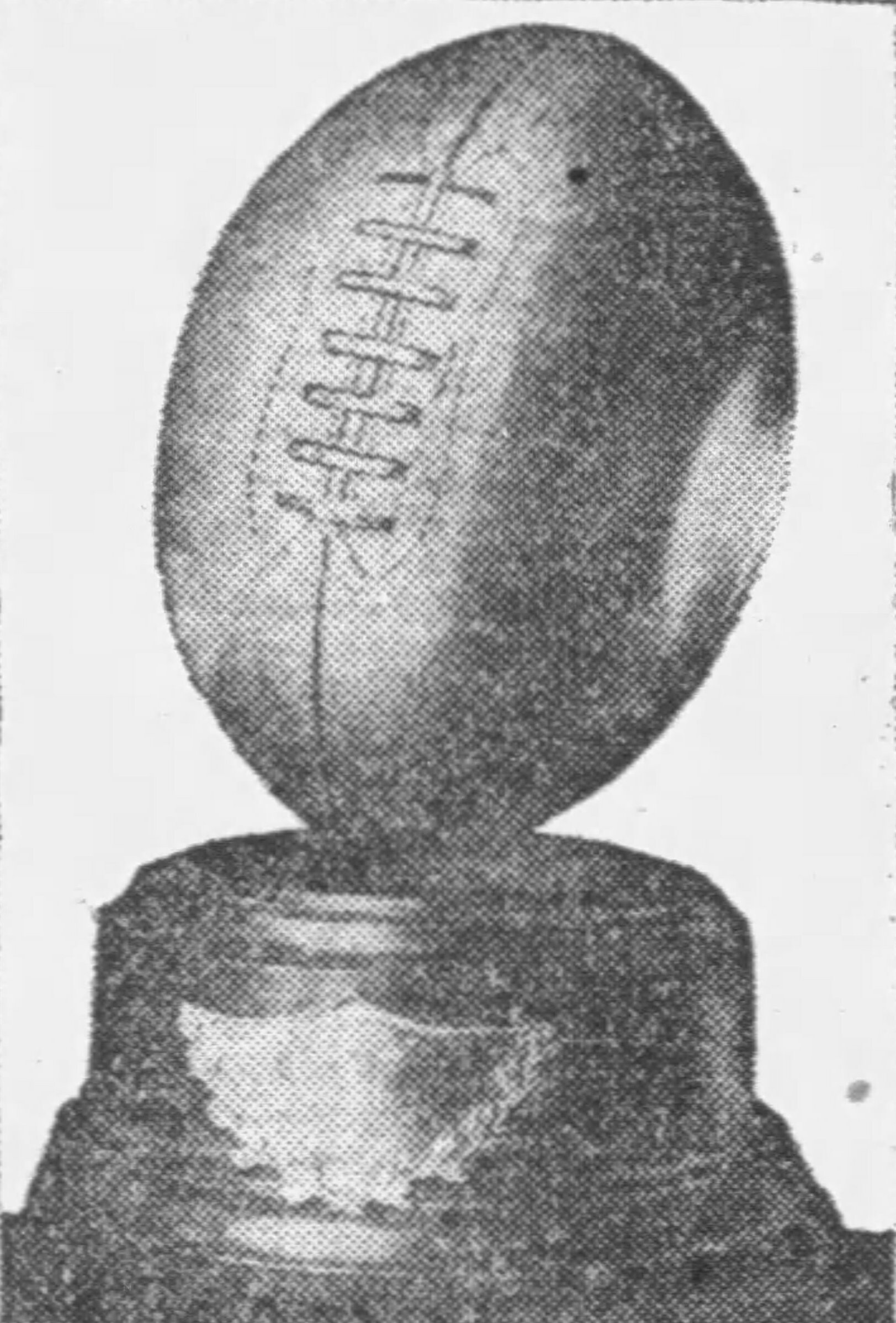
- 1925 photograph of the trophy statue given to the recipient
- Awarded for: Most Valuable Player of the Big Ten Conference
- Country: United States
- Presented by: Chicago Tribune

History
- First award: 1924
- Most recent: Fernando Mendoza, Indiana
- Website: http://www.chicagotribune.com

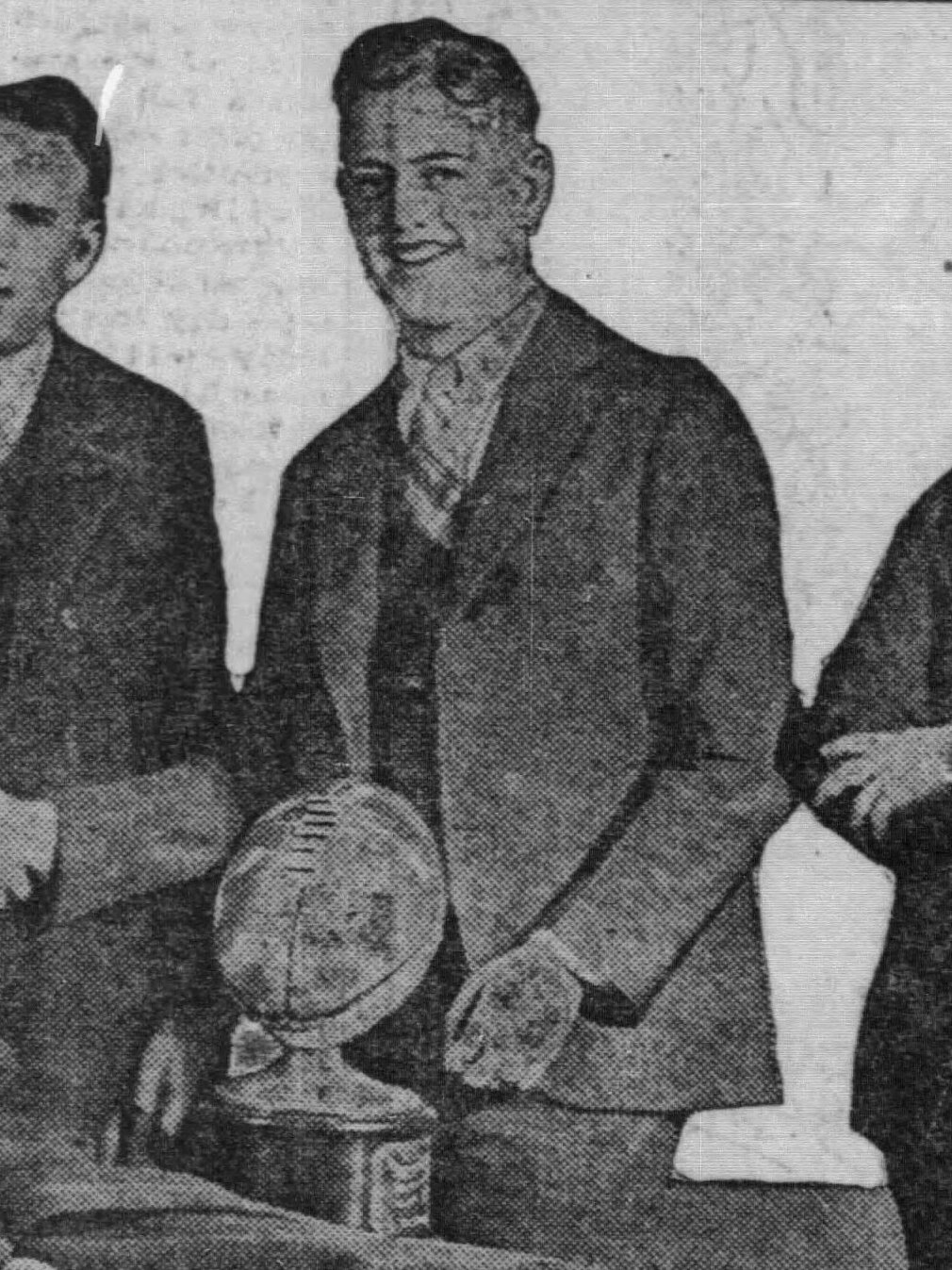
Tim Lowry receiving the 1925 season's trophy

The Chicago Tribune Silver Football is awarded by the Chicago Tribune to the college football player determined to be the best player from the Big Ten Conference. The award has been presented annually since 1924, when Red Grange of Illinois was the award's first recipient. In 2022, the Chicago Tribune announced a new partnership with the Union League Club of Chicago, where it is currently housed.

A vote of Big Ten head football coaches determines the winner of the Silver Football. Each coach submits a two-player ballot with a first and second choice, and coaches cannot vote for players on their own team. The first-place vote receives two points and the second-place vote receives one point.

Coaches and media of the Big Ten also make annual selections for additional individual honors.

== Recipients ==
The Silver Football award has been presented annually since 1924.

Year	Player	Team	Position	Notes
1924	Red Grange	Illinois	HB	
1925	Tim Lowry	Northwestern	C	
1926	Benny Friedman	Michigan	QB	
1927	Ken Rouse	Chicago	C	
1928	Chuck Bennett	Indiana	HB	
1929	Bill Glassgow	Iowa	HB	
1930	Wes Fesler	Ohio State	TE	Ohio State head coach (1947–1950)
1931	Biggie Munn	Minnesota	G/FB	Michigan State head coach (1947–1953)
1932	Harry Newman	Michigan	QB	
1933	Joe Laws	Iowa	QB	
1934	Pug Lund	Minnesota	HB	
1935	Jay Berwanger	Chicago	HB	Heisman Trophy winner
1936	Vern Huffman	Indiana	HB/QB	All-American in football and basketball
1937	Corbett Davis	Indiana	FB	
1938	Howard Weiss	Wisconsin	FB	
1939	Nile Kinnick	Iowa	HB	Heisman Trophy winner
1940	Tom Harmon	Michigan	HB	Heisman Trophy winner
1941	Jack Graf	Ohio State	QB/FB	
1942	Dave Schreiner	Wisconsin	TE	Killed in action during World War II
1943	Otto Graham	Northwestern	QB	Washington Redskins head coach (1966–1968), NFL MVP (1951, 1953, 1955)
1944	Les Horvath	Ohio State	HB/QB	Heisman Trophy winner
1945	Ollie Cline	Ohio State	FB	
1946	Alex Agase	Illinois	G	Northwestern head coach (1964–1972), Purdue head coach (1973–1976)
1947	Bump Elliott	Michigan	HB	Michigan head coach (1959–1968)
1948	Art Murakowski	Northwestern	FB	
1949	Red Wilson	Wisconsin	TE	
1950	Vic Janowicz	Ohio State	HB	Heisman Trophy winner
1951	Bill Reichardt	Iowa	FB	
1952	Paul Giel	Minnesota	HB	
1953	Paul Giel	Minnesota	HB	First two-time winner, UPI Player of the Year
1954	Alan Ameche	Wisconsin	FB	Heisman Trophy winner, UPI Player of the Year
1955	Howard Cassady	Ohio State	HB	Heisman Trophy winner, UPI Player of the Year, AP Male Athlete of the Year
1956	Ken Ploen	Iowa	QB	
1957	Jim Pace	Michigan	HB	
1958	Randy Duncan	Iowa	QB	
1959	Bill Burrell	Illinois	G	
1960	Tom Brown	Minnesota	G/DL	
1961	Sandy Stephens	Minnesota	QB	
1962	Ron Vander Kelen	Wisconsin	QB	
1963	Dick Butkus	Illinois	LB	Two-time NFL Defensive Player of the Year
1964	Bob Timberlake	Michigan	QB	
1965	Jim Grabowski	Illinois	RB	
1966	Bob Griese	Purdue	QB	NFL MVP (1971)
1967	Leroy Keyes	Purdue	RB	
1968	Ron Johnson	Michigan	RB	
1969	Mike Phipps	Purdue	QB	
1970	Mike Adamle	Northwestern	RB	
1971	Eric Allen	Michigan State	RB	
1972	Otis Armstrong	Purdue	RB	
1973	Archie Griffin	Ohio State	RB	
1974	Archie Griffin	Ohio State	RB	Heisman Trophy winner, UPI Player of the Year, Sporting News Player of the Year
1975	Cornelius Greene	Ohio State	QB	
1976	Rob Lytle	Michigan	RB	
1977	Larry Bethea	Michigan State	DE	
1978	Rick Leach	Michigan	QB	
1979	Tim Clifford	Indiana	QB	
1980	Mark Herrmann	Purdue	QB	
1981	Art Schlichter	Ohio State	QB	AFL MVP (1990)
1982	Anthony Carter	Michigan	WR	First wide receiver to win the award
1983	Don Thorp	Illinois	DL	
1984	Keith Byars	Ohio State	RB	
1985	Chuck Long	Iowa	QB	San Diego State head coach (2006–2008)
1986	Jim Harbaugh	Michigan	QB	NFL Coach of the Year (2011), Michigan head coach (2015–2023)
1987	Lorenzo White	Michigan State	RB	
1988	Anthony Thompson	Indiana	RB	
1989	Anthony Thompson	Indiana	RB	
1990	Nick Bell	Iowa	RB	
1991	Desmond Howard	Michigan	WR	Heisman Trophy winner, UPI Player of the Year, Sporting News Player of the Year, Super Bowl MVP (XXXI)
1992	Lee Gissendaner	Northwestern	WR	
1993	Brent Moss	Wisconsin	RB	
1994	Kerry Collins	Penn State	QB	
1995	Eddie George	Ohio State	RB	Heisman Trophy winner
1996	Orlando Pace	Ohio State	OT	
1997	Charles Woodson	Michigan	CB	Heisman Trophy winner, NFL Defensive Player of the Year (2009)
1998	Joe Germaine	Ohio State	QB	
1999	Ron Dayne	Wisconsin	RB	Heisman Trophy winner, NCAA all-time leading rusher, AP Player of the Year, Sporting News Player of the Year
2000	Drew Brees	Purdue	QB	Super Bowl MVP (XLVI), NFL Offensive Player of the Year (2008, 2011), AP Male Athlete of the Year (2010), Sports Illustrated Sportsperson of the Year (2010), Walter Payton Man of the Year (2006)
2001	Antwaan Randle El	Indiana	QB	
2002	Brad Banks	Iowa	QB	AP Player of the Year
2003	Chris Perry	Michigan	RB	
2004	Braylon Edwards	Michigan	WR	
2005	Michael Robinson	Penn State	QB	
2006	Troy Smith	Ohio State	QB	Heisman Trophy winner, AP Player of the Year, Sporting News Player of the Year
2007	Rashard Mendenhall	Illinois	RB	
2008	Shonn Greene	Iowa	RB	
2009	Daryll Clark	Penn State	QB	
2009	Brandon Graham	Michigan	DE	
2010	Denard Robinson	Michigan	QB	
2011	Montee Ball	Wisconsin	RB	
2012	Braxton Miller	Ohio State	QB	
2013	Braxton Miller	Ohio State	QB	
2014	Melvin Gordon	Wisconsin	RB	
2015	Ezekiel Elliott	Ohio State	RB	
2016	J. T. Barrett	Ohio State	QB	
2016	Saquon Barkley	Penn State	RB	
2017	Saquon Barkley	Penn State	RB	
2018	Dwayne Haskins	Ohio State	QB	
2019	Chase Young	Ohio State	DE	Big Ten Male Athlete of the Year (2020), NFL Defensive Rookie of the Year (2020)
2020	Justin Fields	Ohio State	QB	
2021	Aidan Hutchinson	Michigan	DE	
2022	Blake Corum	Michigan	RB	
2023	Marvin Harrison Jr.	Ohio State	WR	
2024	Dillon Gabriel	Oregon	QB	
2025	Fernando Mendoza	Indiana	QB	Heisman Trophy winner, Davey O'Brien Award

=== Winners by school ===
School	Winners	First	Most recent
Ohio State	23	Wes Fesler, 1930	Marvin Harrison Jr., 2023
Michigan	19	Benny Friedman, 1926	Blake Corum, 2022
Iowa	10	Bill Glassgow, 1929	Shonn Greene, 2008
Wisconsin	9	Howard Weiss, 1938	Melvin Gordon, 2014
Illinois	7	Red Grange, 1924	Rashard Mendenhall, 2007
Indiana	7	Chuck Bennett, 1928	Fernando Mendoza, 2025
Minnesota	6	Biggie Munn, 1931	Sandy Stephens, 1961
Purdue	6	Bob Griese, 1966	Drew Brees, 2000
Northwestern	5	Tim Lowry, 1925	Lee Gissendaner, 1992
Penn State	5	Kerry Collins, 1994	Saquon Barkley, 2017
Michigan State	3	Eric Allen, 1971	Lorenzo White, 1987
Chicago	2	Ken Rouse, 1927	Jay Berwanger, 1935
Oregon	1	Dillon Gabriel, 2024	Dillon Gabriel, 2024
Maryland	0	None	
Nebraska	0	None	
Rutgers	0	None	
UCLA	0	None	
USC	0	None	
Washington	0	None	

=== Winners by position ===
Offense			Defense		
Position	Total	Last	Position	Total	Last
RB / HB	40	Blake Corum, Michigan, 2022	DE / DT	6	Aidan Hutchinson, Michigan, 2021
QB	36	Fernando Mendoza, Indiana, 2025	DB / CB / S	1	Charles Woodson, Michigan, 1997
OT / G / C	7	Orlando Pace, OSU, 1996	LB	1	Dick Butkus, Illinois,1963 (Note: Butkus also played at center.)
FB	8	Alan Ameche, Wisconsin, 1954			
WR	5	Marvin Harrison Jr., OSU, 2023			
TE	3	Red Wilson, Wisconsin, 1949			

== See also ==
- Big Ten Conference football individual awards
- Chicago Tribune Silver Basketball
