= 1927 All-Big Ten Conference football team =

American college football all-star team

The 1927 All-Big Ten Conference football team consists of American football players selected to the All-Big Ten Conference teams chosen by various selectors for the 1927 Big Ten Conference football season.

== All Big-Ten selections ==
=== Ends ===
- Bennie Oosterbaan, Michigan (AP-1, CDN-1, HJ-1; UP-1; WE-1)
- Waldo A. Fisher, Northwestern (AP-1, CDN-1, HJ-1; UP-1; WE-3)
- Ken Haycraft, Minnesota (AP-2, HJ-2; WE-1)
- Garland Grange, Illinois (AP-2, CDN-2; WE-2)
- Don Cameron, Wisconsin (HJ-2)
- LeRoy G. Heston, Michigan (CDN-2)
- Bob Tanner, Minnesota (WE-2)
- Herman Z. Nyland, Michigan (WE-3)

=== Tackles ===
- Leo Raskowski, Ohio State (AP-1, CDN-1, HJ-1; UP-1; WE-1)
- Butch Nowack, Illinois (AP-1, CDN-1, HJ-2; WE-1)
- Mike Gary, Minnesota (AP-2, HJ-1; UP-1; WE-3)
- Spike Nelson, Iowa (AP-2, CDN-2, HJ-2; WE-2)
- Lewis, Minnesota (CDN-2)
- Stanley Binish, Wisconsin (WE-2)
- Norman Gabel, Michigan (WE-3)

=== Guards ===
- Ray Baer, Michigan (AP-1, CDN-1, HJ-1; UP-1; WE-1)
- Hal Hanson, Minnesota (AP-1, HJ-2; WE-2)
- John R. Matthews, Indiana (AP-2; WE-1)
- George Gibson, Minnesota (AP-2)
- Ernest W. Schultz, Illinois (HJ-2)
- Justin Whitlock Dart, Northwestern (CDN-1)
- Wilbert O. Catterton, Indiana (CDN-2)
- Russ Crane, Illinois (CDN-2; WE-2)
- Buck Weaver, Chicago (WE-3)
- Carroll Ringwalt, Indiana (WE-3)

=== Centers ===
- Ken Rouse, Chicago (AP-1, CDN-1, HJ-1 [guard]; UP-1; WE-1)
- Robert Reitsch, Illinois (AP-2, CDN-2, HJ-1; UP-1; WE-2)
- Clare Randolph, Indiana (HJ-2)
- George MacKinnon, Minnesota (WE-3)

=== Quarterbacks ===
- Harold "Shorty" Almquist, Minnesota (AP-1 [halfback], CDN-1, HJ-1; UP-1; WE-1)
- Edwin Crofoot, Wisconsin (AP-1, CDN-2, HJ-2; UP-2 [halfback])
- Byron Eby, Ohio State (AP-2)
- Vic Gustafson, Northwestern (UP-2)
- Harold Barnhart, Minnesota (WE-2)
- Carl Pignatelli, Iowa (UP-3)
- Fred Grim, Ohio State (WE-3)

=== Halfbacks ===
- Louis Gilbert, Michigan (AP-1, CDN-1, HJ-1; UP-1; WE-1)
- Jud Timm, Illinois (AP-2, CDN-1, HJ-1; UP-1; WE-1)
- Chester "Cotton" Wilcox, Purdue (AP-2; UP-2)
- Mally Nydahl, Minnesota (HJ-2; WE-3)
- Ralph Welch, Purdue (CDN-2, HJ-2; WE-2)
- Hugh Mendenhall, Chicago (CDN-2)
- Paul Armil, Iowa (UP-3)
- Chuck Bennett, Indiana (UP-3; WE-2)
- Gene H. Rose, Wisconsin (WE-3)

=== Fullbacks ===
- Herb Joesting, Minnesota (AP-1, CDN-1, HJ-1; UP-1; WE-1)
- Tiny Lewis, Northwestern (AP-2, CDN-2, HJ-2; UP-2)
- George Rich, Michigan (WE-2)
- Fred Humbert, Illinois (UP-3)
- Abraham Koransky, Purdue (WE-3)

== Key ==
AP = Associated Press

CDN = Chicago Daily News

HJ = Harold Johnson for the Chicago Evening American

UP = United Press, chosen by UP correspondent Clark B. Kelsey "in collaboration with a dozen football writers in Big Ten territory"

WE = Walter Eckersall

Bold = Consensus first-team selections of a majority of the AP, UP and Eckersall

== See also ==
- 1927 College Football All-America Team
