= Merwin Mitterwallner =

American football player (1897–1974)

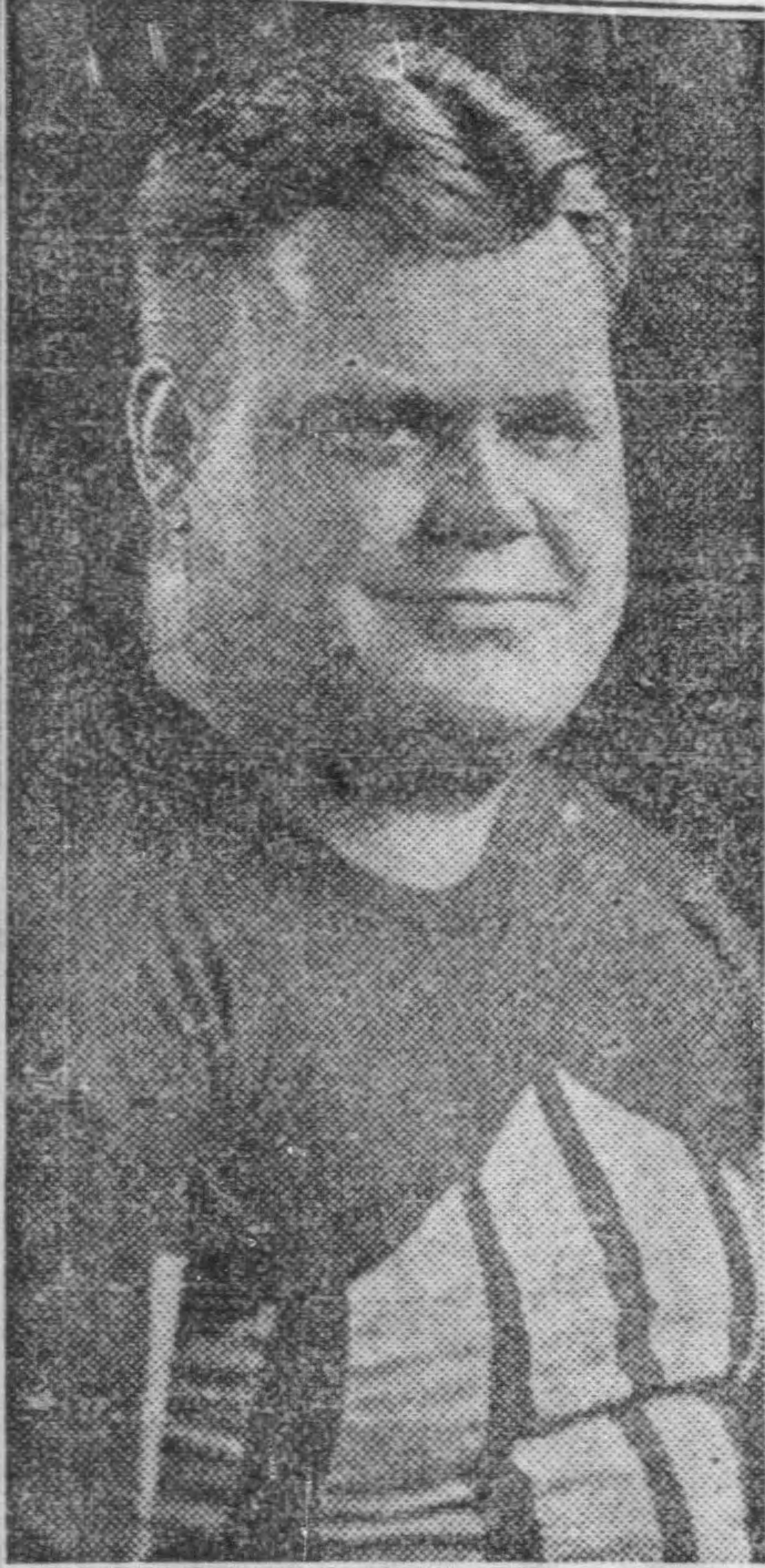
- Merwin Mitterwallner, 1926

Profile
- Position: Guard

Personal information
- Born: July 4, 1897; Trumansburg, New York, U.S.
- Died: December 1, 1974 (aged 77)
- Listed height: 5 ft 10 in (1.78 m)
- Listed weight: 230 lb (104 kg)

Career information
- College: Illinois

Awards and highlights
- National champion (1927); First-team All-American (1925); Second-team All-Big Ten (1925)

Merwin Mitterwallner (July 4, 1897 – December 1, 1974), sometimes known as Bubbles Mitterwallner, was an American football player. Mitterwallner was born in Trumansburg, New York. He played college football at the guard position at both the University of Denver and the University of Illinois. While playing for Illinois, he was a key blocker for Red Grange and was selected by Herbert Reed as a first-team player on the 1925 College Football All-America Team. He also received third-team All-American honors from the International News Service and the Chicago Daily News.
