= Chuck Kassel =

American football player (1903–1977)

No. 24, 7
- Position: End

Personal information
- Born: November 20, 1903; Chicago, Illinois, U.S.
- Died: November 30, 1977 (aged 74); Elgin, Illinois, U.S.
- Listed height: 6 ft 1 in (1.85 m)
- Listed weight: 191 lb (87 kg)

Career information
- High school: Maywood (IL) Proviso East
- College: Illinois

Career history
- Chicago Bears (1927); Frankford Yellow Jackets (1927–1928); Chicago Cardinals (1929–1933)

Awards and highlights
- Second-team All-American (1925); First-team All-Big Ten (1925); Second-team All-Big Ten (1926)

Career statistics
- Receptions: 9
- Receiving yards: 185
- Touchdowns: 7
- Stats at Pro Football Reference

Charles Edward Kassel (November 20, 1903 – November 30, 1977) was an American professional football player who played as an end in the National Football League (NFL) for seven seasons with the Chicago Bears, the Frankford Yellow Jackets, and the Chicago Cardinals. Before his professional career, he was a star player for Proviso Township High School in Maywood, Illinois, a suburb west of Chicago. After his football career, he taught physical education and coached at Proviso for several decades.
