= Herb Joesting =

American football player and coach (1905–1963)

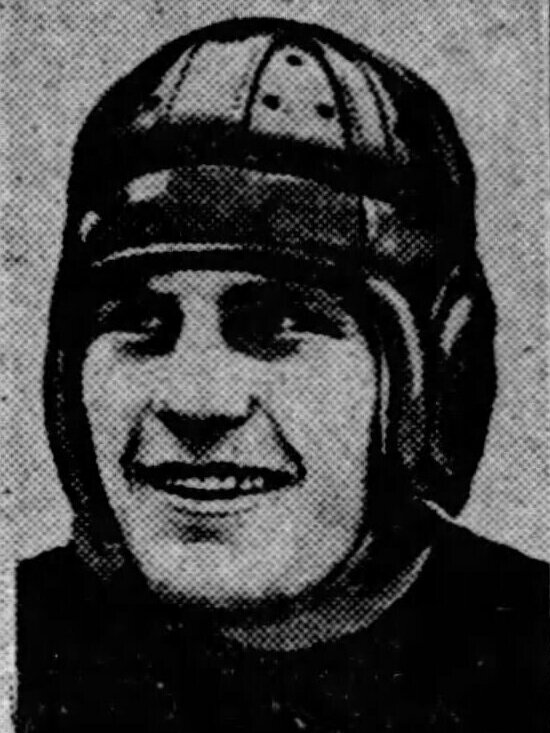
- Joesting circa 1927

Profile
- Positions: Halfback, fullback

Personal information
- Born: April 17, 1905; Little Falls, Minnesota, U.S.
- Died: October 1, 1963 (aged 58); St. Paul, Minnesota, U.S.

Career information
- College: Minnesota

Career history

Playing
- 1929–1930: Minneapolis Red Jackets
- 1930–1931: Frankford Yellow Jackets
- 1931–1932: Chicago Bears

Coaching
- 1929: Minneapolis Red Jackets

Awards and highlights
- 2× Consensus All-American (1926, 1927); 2× First-team All-Big Ten (1926, 1927); Second-team All-Big Ten (1925)
- Coaching profile at Pro Football Reference
- College Football Hall of Fame

Herbert Walter Joesting (April 17, 1905 – October 1, 1963) was an American football player and coach. He was a consensus All-American fullback while playing for the Minnesota Golden Gophers in both 1926 and 1927. He also played three seasons in the National Football League (NFL). He was inducted into the College Football Hall of Fame in 1954.

== Early life ==
Joesting was born in Little Falls, Minnesota, and grew up in Owatonna, Minnesota. He played high school football at Owatonna High School and set the school's scoring record in 1923 with 89 points. He became known as the "Owatonna Thunderbolt".

== University of Minnesota ==
Joesting enrolled at the University of Minnesota in 1924 and played college football for the Minnesota Golden Gophers football team from 1925 to 1927. As a junior in 1926, he rushed for 962 yards in eight games and led the Big Ten Conference in scoring with 13 touchdowns and 78 points. His 13 touchdowns also tied Red Grange's single-season record. After the 1926 season, he was voted by his teammates to be the captain of the 1927 Minnesota team. Potsy Clark called Joesting the best fullback he ever saw.

Joesting won numerous honors during his time at Minnesota. He was selected as a consensus fullback on the 1926 and 1927 College Football All-America Teams. He also won first-team All-Big Ten Conference honors for three consecutive years in 1925, 1926, and 1927. He was later inducted into the College Football Hall of Fame in 1954, the Helms Foundation Football Hall of Fame in 1961, and the University of Minnesota Athletic Hall of Fame in 1992.

While at the University of Minnesota, Joesting was a member of Sigma Chi fraternity, at the same time as Bronko Nagurski.

== Professional basketball and football ==
After leaving the University of Minnesota, Joesting played professional basketball in 1928 with the field artillery basketball team of Minneapolis. In 1929, he joined the Minneapolis Red Jackets as player-coach, leading the team to a 1–9 record. In 1930, he was traded to the Frankford Yellow Jackets. He played for Frankford and the Chicago Bears in 1931 and finished his career with the Bears in 1932.

== Later life ==
In 1930, Joesting began a career, interrupted by leaves to play professional football, with the Minnesota Department of Motor Vehicles, becoming supervisor of deputy registrars in 1952.

Joesting died of heart disease in 1963 at age 58 while driving a car near his home in St. Paul, Minnesota.
