= Leo Raskowski =

American football player (1906–1952)

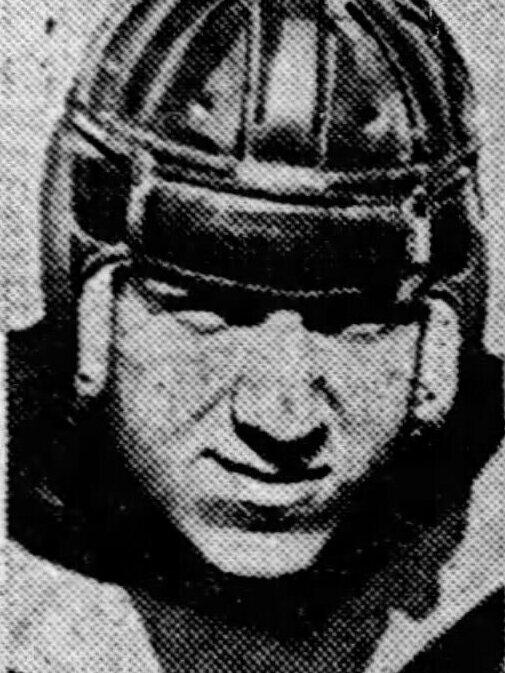
- Raskowski circa 1927

No. 70, 43, 45
- Positions: Guard, Tackle

Personal information
- Born: March 28, 1906; Cleveland, Ohio, U.S.
- Died: October 30, 1952 (aged 46); Vancouver, Washington, U.S.
- Listed height: 6 ft 3 in (1.91 m)
- Listed weight: 219 lb (99 kg)

Career information
- College: Ohio State

Career history
- Staten Island Stapletons (1932); Brooklyn Dodgers (1933); Pittsburgh Pirates (1933); Philadelphia Eagles (1935); Alexandria Celtics (1936)

Awards and highlights
- First-team All-American (1927); Third-team All-American (1926); 2× First-team All-Big Ten (1926, 1927); Second-team All-Big Ten (1928)
- Stats at Pro Football Reference

Leo Thomas Raskowski (March 28, 1906 – October 30, 1952) was an American college and professional football player of the 1920s and 1930s. He was born in Cleveland, Ohio to Thomas (a Polish immigrant) and Julia Raskowski. At Ohio State, he and received All-American honors in 1926 and 1927, was team captain in 1928 and was also a member of Phi Kappa Tau fraternity. After he graduated, Raskowski went on to play professional football in the National Football League (NFL) for the Staten Island Stapletons, Brooklyn Dodgers, Pittsburgh Pirates and the Philadelphia Eagles. He later took the name of Leo Randall in 1939 and moved to Vancouver in 1943 to become a recreation director. He died there after a long illness at the age of 46.

He was inducted posthumously into the Ohio State Varsity O Hall of Fame in 2011.

== See also ==
- 1926 College Football All-America Team
- 1927 College Football All-America Team
