= 1927 All-America college football team =

Official list of the best college football players of 1927

The 1927 All-America college football team is composed of college football players who were selected as All-Americans by various organizations and writers that chose All-America college football teams in 1927. The seven selectors recognized by the NCAA as "official" for the 1927 season are (1) Collier's Weekly, as selected by Grantland Rice with cooperation from ten coaches, (2) the Associated Press, (3) the United Press, selected based on consensus among UP newspapers throughout the country and prominent football coaches, (4) the All-America Board, (5) the International News Service (INS), (6) the Newspaper Enterprise Association (NEA), and (7) the North American Newspaper Alliance (NANA).

== Consensus All-Americans ==
Following the death of Walter Camp in 1925, there was a proliferation of All-American teams in the late 1920s. For the year 1927, the NCAA recognizes seven published All-American teams as "official" designations for purposes of its consensus determinations. The following chart identifies the NCAA-recognized consensus All-Americans and displays which first-team designations they received. Michigan end Bennie Oosterbaan and Pittsburgh halfback Gibby Welch were the only players to be unanimously selected by all seven selectors as first-team All-Americans.

Name	Position	School	Number	Selectors
Bennie Oosterbaan	End	Michigan	7/7	AAB, AP, CO, INS, NANA, NEA, UP
Gibby Welch	Halfback	Pitt	7/7	AAB, AP, CO, INS, NANA, NEA, UP
Morley Drury	Quarterback	USC	6/7	AAB, AP, CO, INS, NEA, UP
Clipper Smith	Guard	Notre Dame	6/7	AAB, AP, CO, INS, NEA, UP
Herb Joesting	Fullback	Minnesota	6/7	AAB, AP, CO, INS, NEA, UP
Bill Webster	Guard	Yale	5/7	AAB, AP, INS, NANA, NEA
Tom Nash	End	Georgia	4/7	AAB, CO, INS, NANA
Jesse Hibbs	Tackle	USC	4/7	AAB, INS, NANA, UP
Ed Hake	Tackle	Penn	3/7	AP, NANA, UP
Larry Bettencourt	Center	St. Mary's	3/7	AAB, AP, INS
John Charlesworth	Center	Yale	3/7	CO, NEA, UP
Red Cagle	Halfback	Army	3/7	AAB, CO, NANA

== All-American selections for 1927 ==
=== Ends ===
- Bennie Oosterbaan, Michigan (CFHOF) (AAB; AP-1; UP-1; COL-1; INS-1; NEA; NANA; CP-1; CEP-1; HE-1; NYS-1; BE-1; LP-1; WE-1)
- Tom Nash, Georgia (AAB; AP-3; UP-3; COL-1; INS-1; NANA; CEP-3; HE-1; BE-3; LP-1; WE-1)
- Ivey Shiver, Georgia (AP-1; UP-1; NEA; CP-2; HE-2; INS-3; NYS-1; BE-1; LP-2)
- Dwight Fishwick, Yale (CP-1; WE-3)
- George Cole, Dartmouth (AP-2; CEP-3; HE-3; INS-2)
- Rags Matthews, TCU (CFHOF) (AP-2; INS-2; NYS-2; BE-3)
- Irvine Phillips, California (AP-3; CP-2)
- Stewart Scott, Yale (UP-2; BE-2)
- Charles Born, Army (UP-2; CEP-1; HE-2; INS-3; NYS-2; BE-2)
- Charlie Moeser, Princeton (HE-3; LP-2; WE-2)
- Matthews, SMU (CEP-2)
- Lou Jennings, Centenary (CEP-2)
- Joe Donchess, Pittsburgh (CFHOF) (WE-2)
- Charles Walsh, Notre Dame (UP-3)
- Ted Fleck, Kansas Aggies (WE-3)

=== Tackles ===
- Jesse Hibbs, USC (AAB; AP-2; UP-1; INS-1; NANA; CP-1; CEP-2; HE-1; NYS-1; BE-2; LP-1; WE-1)
- Ed Hake, Penn (AP-1; UP-1; NANA; CP-2; CEP-3; HE-2; BE-3)
- Bud Sprague, Army (CFHOF) (AP-1; UP-2; INS-1; CP-1; HE-1)
- Bill Kern, Pittsburgh (INS-2; NEA; HE-2; NYS-2; BE-1)
- John Smith, Penn (AP-2; COL-1; LP-2; INS-3; WE-2)
- Leo Raskowski, Ohio State (AP-3; COL-1; NEA; HE-3; BE-1; CEP-1; LP-1; WE-1)
- Fred Pickhard, Alabama (UP-2; CP-2)
- Leo Nowack, Illinois (AP-3)
- George Perry, Army (LP-2; NYS-1; BE-2)
- Jap Douds, Washington & Jefferson (BE-3; CEP-1; HE-3; INS-2)
- Sidney Quarrier, Yale (AAB; UP-3; CEP-2; WE-2)
- James J. Fitzgerald, Tufts (UP-3)
- Alton C. Sprott, Texas A&M (INS-3; NYS-2; BE-3 [g])
- Roy Randells, Nebraska (CEP-3)
- Fritz Coultrin, California (WE-3)
- Francis E. Lucas, Missouri (WE-3)

=== Guards ===
- Bill Webster, Yale (AAB; AP-1; UP-2; INS-1; NEA; NANA; CP-1; CEP-1; HE-1; NYS-1; BE-1; LP-1; WE-1)
- Clipper Smith, Notre Dame (CFHOF) (AAB; AP-1; UP-1; COL-1; INS-1; NEA; CP-1; CEP-2; HE-1; NYS-1; BE-1; WE-1)
- Russ Crane, Illinois (COL-1; LP-2)
- Ray Baer, Michigan (AP-2; UP-2; CP-2; HE-2; INS-2; BE-2; WE-2)
- John Barnhill, Tennessee (AP-2)
- Hal Hanson, Minnesota (AP-3; UP-1; NANA; CP-2; CEP-1; HE-2; INS-3; NYS-2; BE-2; LP-1; WE-3)
- Gene Smith, Georgia (AP-3)
- William Wright, Washington (INS-2; NYS-2; BE-3; LP-2)
- John Roberts, Pittsburgh (WE-2)
- Justin Whitlock Dart, Northwestern (UP-3)
- R. Van I. Miller, Amherst (UP-3)
- Danny McMullen, Nebraska (INS-3)
- J. M. French, Princeton (HE-3)
- Seraphim Post, Stanford (HE-3)
- Raleigh Drennon, Georgia Tech (CEP-2; WE-3)
- Robert N. Miller, Missouri (CEP-3)
- E. G. Blake, Princeton (CEP-3)

=== Centers ===
- Larry Bettencourt, St. Mary's (CFHOF) (AAB; AP-1; INS-1; CP-2; HE-1; NYS-1; BE-2; LP-2; WE-1)
- John Charlesworth, Yale (UP-1; COL-1; NEA; CP-1; HE-2; BE-1)
- Claude Grigsby, Georgetown (AP-2; HE-3)
- Ken Rouse, Chicago (AP-3; UP-3; WE-2)
- Robert Reitsch, Illinois (NANA; CEP-2; INS-3; NYS-2; BE-3; LP-1; WE-3)
- Charles Howe, Princeton (CEP-1)
- John McCreery, Stanford (UP-2)
- Elvin Butcher, Tennessee (CEP-3; INS-2)

=== Quarterbacks ===
- Morley Drury, USC (CFHOF) (AAB; AP-1 [hb]; UP-1; COL-1; INS-1 [hb]; NEA; CP-1; CEP-1; HE-1; NYS-1; BE-1; LP-1; WE-1)
- Bill Spears, Vanderbilt (CFHOF) (AP-1; UP-2; INS-1; NANA; CP-2; CEP-2; HE-3; LP-2; WE-2)
- Harold Almquist, Minnesota (AP-3)
- Jack Connor, NYU (HE-2; INS-2; NYS-2; BE-2; LP-2)
- Gerald Mann, SMU (CFHOF) (BE-3)
- Frederick M. Ellis, Tufts (CEP-3)
- Dominic E. Engbarth, Texas

=== Halfbacks ===
- Gibby Welch, Pittsburgh (AAB; AP-1; UP-1; COL-1; INS-1; NEA; NANA; CP-1; CEP-1; HE-1; NYS-1; BE-1; LP-1; WE-1)
- Red Cagle, Army (CFHOF) (AAB; AP-3; UP-3; COL-1; NANA; CEP-3; HE-2; WE-1)
- Christie Flanagan, Notre Dame (UP-1; NEA; CP-1; HE-3; INS-3; BE-1)
- Alton Marsters, Dartmouth (AP-2; UP-2; HE-3; INS-2; NYS-2; BE-2; CEP-1; LP-2; WE-2)
- Glenn Presnell, Nebraska (AP-2; UP-2; HE-2; INS-2; NYS-2; BE-2; CEP-2; LP-1; WE-2)
- Joel Hunt, Texas A&M (CFHOF) (AP-2 [qb]; INS-3 [qb]; BE-3; CEP-2; LP-2; WE-3 [qb])
- Chuck Carroll, Washington (CFHOF) (AP-3)
- Louis Gilbert, Michigan (UP-3 [qb]; CP-2; BE-3; WE-3)
- Walter "Swede" Gebert, Marquette (UP-3; INS-3; LP-2)
- Bruce Caldwell, Yale (CP-2; HE-1; NYS-1; LP-2)
- Bob Nork, Georgetown (CEP-3)
- Johnny Roepke, Penn State (WE-3)

=== Fullbacks ===
- Herb Joesting, Minnesota (CFHOF) (AAB; AP-1; UP-1; COL-1; INS-1; NEA; CP-1; CEP-3; HE-1; NYS-1; BE-1; LP-1; WE-1)
- Herdis McCrary, Georgia (AP-2; UP-2; CEP-1; HE-3; INS-2; WE-2)
- Bill Amos, Washington & Jefferson (AP-3; CEP-2; HE-2; BE-3)
- Mike Miles, Princeton (NANA; NYS-2; BE-2; WE-3)
- Pat Wilson, Washington (LP-2)
- Biff Hoffman, Stanford (INS-3; LP-2)
- Lou Tesreau, Washington (UP-3)
- Frank Briante, NYU (CP-2)

== Key ==
- **Bold** – Consensus All-American
- -1 – First-team selection
- -2 – Second-team selection
- -3 – Third-team selection
- CFHOF – College Football Hall of Fame

=== Official selectors ===
- AAB = All America Board
- AP = Associated Press
- COL = Collier's Weekly as selected by Grantland Rice with assistance from well-known coaches, including Glenn Warner, Robert Zuppke, Knute Rockne and Dan McGugin
- INS = International News Service selected by Davis Walsh, INS sports editor
- NEA = Newspaper Enterprise Association
- NANA = North American Newspaper Alliance
- UP = United Press, selected based on consensus among UP newspapers throughout the country and prominent football coaches

=== Other selectors ===
- BE = Billy Evans with the assistance of "100 of the leading football experts of the country"
- CP = Central Press Association, billed as the "Real" All-American team with selections based on fan input with cooperation from "hundreds of newspapers throughout the country"
- CEP = Charles E. Parker for the New York Evening Telegram
- HE = Hearst newspapers, consensus selection of more than 100 sports writers and editors at the Hearst newspapers
- LP = Lawrence Perry
- NYS = New York Sun "based on a canvas of 129 college teams throughout the country by the Sun's representatives" with gold watches being given to the members of the first eleven
- WC = Walter Camp Football Foundation
- WE = Walter Eckersall

== See also ==
- 1927 All-Big Ten Conference football team
- 1927 All-Missouri Valley Conference football team
- 1927 All-Pacific Coast Conference football team
- 1927 All-Southern football team
- 1927 All-Western college football team
