= Mike Gary =

American football player and coach, college athletics administrator

Biographical details
- Born: April 17, 1900; Winona, Minnesota, U.S.
- Died: December 30, 1969 (aged 69); Kalamazoo, Michigan, U.S.

Playing career
- 1925–1927: Minnesota
- Position: Tackle

Coaching career (HC unless noted)
- 1928: Western State Teachers (assistant)
- 1929–1941: Western State Teachers / Western Michigan

Administrative career (AD unless noted)
- 1949–1967: Western Michigan

Head coaching record
- Overall: 59–34–5

Accomplishments and honors

Championships
- 1 MCC (1929)

Awards
- First-team All-Big Ten (1926); Second-team All-Big Ten (1927)

Mitchell Joseph "Mike" Gary (April 17, 1900 – December 30, 1969) was an American college football player and coach and athletics administrator. He was an All-Big Ten football player for the Minnesota Golden Gophers in 1926 and 1927 and served in various coaching, teaching and administrative positions at Western Michigan University from 1928 through 1967. With a record of 59–34–5 (.628 winning percentage), Gary ranks third in wins among Western Michigan football coaches, behind William H. Spaulding and Al Molde.

== Minnesota ==
Gary played college football for the University of Minnesota from 1925 to 1927 and was selected as a first-team All-Big Ten tackle in 1926 and 1927.

== Western Michigan ==
=== Coach ===
Gary was hired as an assistant football coach at Western State Teachers College (now known as Western Michigan University) in 1928. He worked under head coach Earl Martineau during the 1928 season and took over as head coach in 1929. He served as the head football coach at Western Michigan from 1929 to 1941. In 13 years as the head football coach, Gary's teams compiled a record of 59–34–5 (.627 winning percentage) and outscored their opponents by a combined total of 1,426 to 683. He twice coached undefeated football teams. His 1932 team compiled a record of 6–0–1 and outscored opponents 174 to 6. That team gave up six points in the first game of the season and held its opponents scoreless in the remaining six games. In his last season as head coach, the 1941 team compiled a perfect record of 8–0 and outscored opponents 183 to 27. At the end of the 1941 season, the Associated Press wrote the following about Gary's 1941 team:

"Largest of the small undefeated, untied outfits is Western Michigan College where 2,200 students (but only 700 men) all but went crazy as their heroes tripped Western Reserve, Sun Bowl champion, 7–0 in the opener and went on to win seven more. Coach Mitchell J. Gary, who played with Bronko Nagurski at Minnesota, took over as head coach at Western in 1929. He used the T-formation to shake loose Horace Coleman, colored halfback, for 10 touchdowns in seven games."

=== War service ===
With the United States entry into World War II, the 41-year-old Gary joined the United States Navy and served three years in the Naval Air Corps with the rank of commander.

=== Athletic director ===
After the war, Gary returned to Western Michigan as the associate athletic director and professor of physical education. In 1949, he took over as athletic director and held that position until his retirement in 1967. He was also the chairman of the school's Department of Physical Education, Health and Recreation from 1952 to 1957. During Gary's tenure as athletic director, Western Michigan joined the Mid-American Conference.

== Death and posthumous honors ==
Gary died from a heart attack at his home in Kalamazoo, Michigan in December 1969. In 1978, he was inducted into the Western Michigan University Hall of Fame. The Gary Physical Education Center on the Western Michigan campus is named in his honor.

The Mike Gary Athletic Fund was established in 1956. It is a community-based support program dedicated to improving the athletic program at Western Michigan.

== Head coaching record ==
Year	Team	Overall	Conference	Standing	Bowl/playoffs
Western State Teachers Hilltoppers (Michigan Collegiate Conference) (1929–1930)
1929	Western State Teachers	5–2–1	2–0–1	1st	
1930	Western State Teachers	5–1–1	2–1	2nd	
Western State Teachers Hilltoppers /Western State Teachers Broncos / Western Michigan Broncos (Independent) (1931–1941)
1931	Western State Teachers	5–2			
1932	Western State Teachers	6–0–1			
1933	Western State Teachers	3–3–1			
1934	Western State Teachers	7–1			
1935	Western State Teachers	5–3			
1936	Western State Teachers	2–4			
1937	Western State Teachers	5–3			
1938	Western State Teachers	4–3			
1939	Western State Teachers	2–6–1			
1940	Western State Teachers	2–5			
1941	Western Michigan	8–0			
Western State Teachers/ Western Michigan:		59–34–5	4–1–1		
Total:		59–34–5			
National championship Conference title Conference division title or championship game berth
