= Harold V. Almquist =

American football, basketball, and baseball player and coach

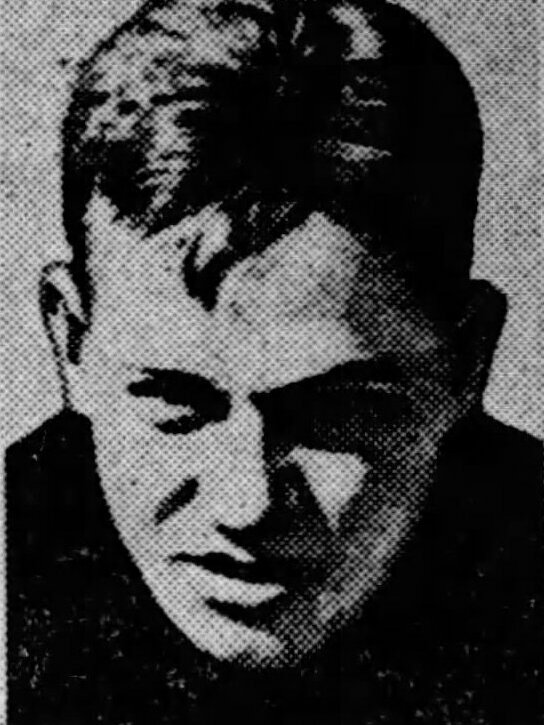
- Almquist circa 1927

Biographical details
- Born: January 19, 1904; Chisago County, Minnesota, U.S.
- Died: April 5, 1994 (aged 90); Moline, Illinois, U.S.

Playing career

Football
- 1925–1927: Minnesota
- Position: Quarterback

Coaching career (HC unless noted)

Football
- 1928–1940: Augustana (IL)
- 1941–1961: Rock Island HS (IL)

Basketball
- 1931–1932: Augustana (IL)
- 1934–1941: Augustana (IL)

Baseball
- 1929–1942: Augustana (IL)

Head coaching record
- Overall: 65–31–10 (college football); 99–60 (college basketball); 23–35 (college baseball)

Accomplishments and honors

Championships
- Football; 1 IIAC (1934)

Awards
- Third-team All-American (1927); First-team All-Big Ten (1927); 2× Second-team All-Big Ten (1925, 1926)

Harold V. "Shorty" Almquist (January 19, 1904 – April 5, 1994) was an American football, basketball, and baseball player and coach. He served as the head football coach at Augustana College in Rock Island, Illinois from 1928 to 1940, compiling a record of 65–31–10. Almquist was also the school's head basketball coach in 1931–32 and from 1934 to 1941, tallying a mark of 99–60, and head baseball coach from 1929 to 1942, amassing a record of 23–35; Augustana did not field a baseball team from 1931 to 1937.

Almquist was born on January 19, 1904, in Chisago County, Minnesota. He died on April 5, 1994, at Trinity Medical Center, East Campus in Moline, Illinois.

== Head coaching record ==
=== Football ===
Year	Team	Overall	Conference	Standing	Bowl/playoffs
Augustana (Illinois) Vikings (Illinois Intercollegiate Athletic Conference) (1928–1937)
1928	Augustana	7–1	6–1	T–3rd	
1929	Augustana	3–4–1	3–3–1	T–13th	
1930	Augustana	4–3	3–2	T–10th	
1931	Augustana	5–2–2	3–1–2	4th	
1932	Augustana	6–0–2	5–0–1	3rd	
1933	Augustana	7–1–1	4–1–1	T–5th	
1934	Augustana	9–0	6–0	T–1st	
1935	Augustana	5–3	3–2	10th	
1936	Augustana	3–5	3–3	T–10th	
1937	Augustana	5–2–1	4–1–1	6th	
Augustana (Illinois) Vikings (Illinois College Conference) (1938–1940)
1938	Augustana	3–4–1	1–3	T–8th	
1939	Augustana	4–4	2–2	T–7th	
1940	Augustana	4–2–2	4–1–1	T–2nd	
Augustana:		65–31–10	47–20–7		
Total:		65–31–10			
National championship Conference title Conference division title or championship game berth
