= Clipper Smith (American football, born 1904) =

American football player and coach, athletics administrator (1904–1973)

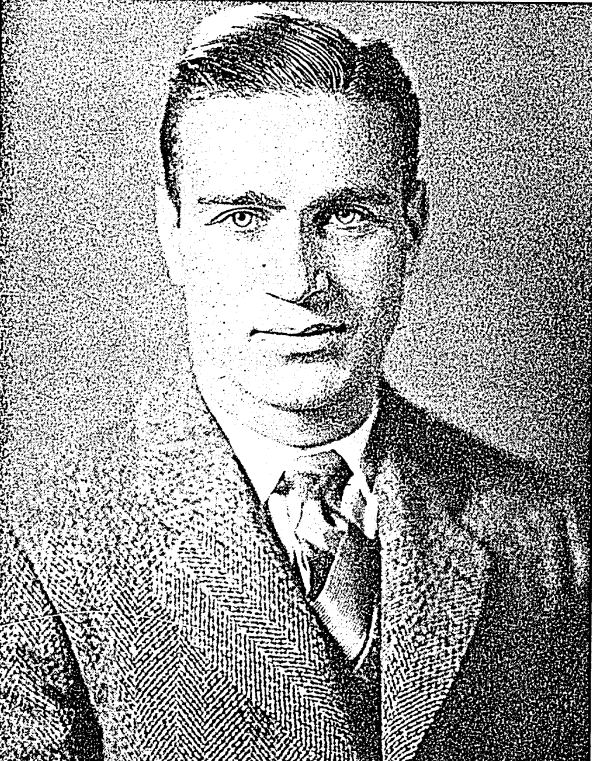
- Smith in 1927

Biographical details
- Born: December 12, 1904; Hartford, Connecticut, U.S.
- Died: May 11, 1973 (aged 68); West Hartford, Connecticut, U.S.

Playing career
- 1925–1927: Notre Dame
- Position: Guard

Coaching career (HC unless noted)
- 1928: Notre Dame (assistant)
- 1929: Trinity (CT) (assistant)
- 1930: Georgetown (assistant)
- 1931–1933: NC State
- 1934: Newark Academy (NJ)
- 1935: Duquesne (line)
- 1936–1938: Duquesne

Administrative career (AD unless noted)
- 1936–1939: Duquesne

Head coaching record
- Overall: 28–24–5 (college)
- Bowls: 1–0

Accomplishments and honors

Awards
- Consensus All-American (1927); Second-team AP All-Time All-American (2025)
- College Football Hall of Fame; Inducted in 1975 (profile)

John Philip "Little Clipper" Smith (December 12, 1904 – May 11, 1973) was an American football player, coach, and college athletics administrator. He played college football as a guard at the University of Notre Dame under Knute Rockne. Smith was a consensus All-American in 1927. He later served as the head coach at North Carolina State University from 1931 to 1933 and at Duquesne University from 1936 to 1938, compiling a career record of 28–24–5. Smith was inducted into the College Football Hall of Fame as a player in 1975. He died on May 11, 1973, in West Hartford, Connecticut just before a National Football Foundation awards dinner that was to have honored him.

== Head coaching record ==
=== College ===
Year	Team	Overall	Conference	Standing	Bowl/playoffs	AP^{#}
NC State Wolfpack (Southern Conference) (1931–1933)
1931	NC State	3–6	2–4	T–17th		
1932	NC State	6–1–2	3–1–1	7th		
1933	NC State	1–5–3	0–4	10th		
NC State:		10–12–5	5–9–1			
Duquesne Dukes (Independent) (1936–1938)
1936	Duquesne	8–2			W Orange	14
1937	Duquesne	6–4				
1938	Duquesne	4–6				
Duquesne:		18–12				
Total:		28–24–5				
^{#}Rankings from final AP Poll.
