= Ken Rouse =

American football player (1906–1958)

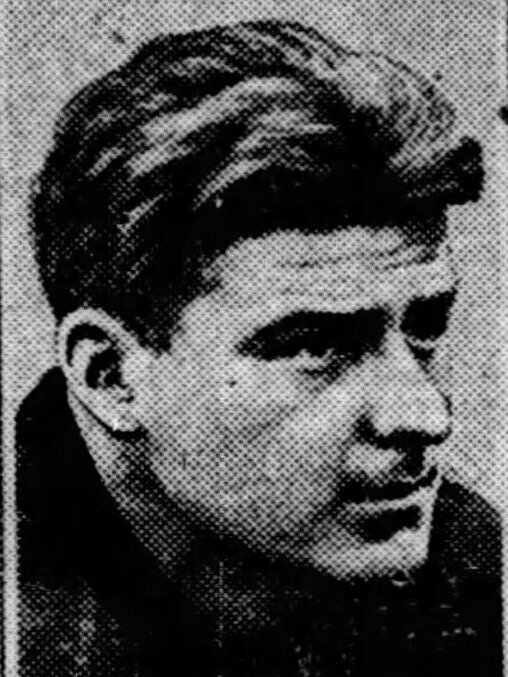
- Rouse, c. 1927

Profile
- Position: Center

Personal information
- Born: August 22, 1906; Hamilton, Ohio, U.S.
- Died: August 6, 1958 (aged 51); Winnetka, Illinois, U.S.

Career information
- College: University of Chicago

Awards and highlights
- Third-team All-American (1927); Chicago Tribune Silver Football (1927); First-team All-Big Ten (1927)

Kenneth Allen Rouse (August 22, 1906 – August 6, 1958) was an American football player. He played at center for the Chicago Maroons from 1925 to 1927 and won the Chicago Tribune Silver Football as the most valuable player in the Big Ten Conference in 1927.

== Early life ==
Rouse was born in 1906 in Hamilton, Ohio. He attended Lindblom High School in Chicago. He played football at Lindblom first at the halfback position and then at center. He was selected as an "All Cook County" player as a senior. He was also editor of the school newspaper, held the rank of major and student head of the Lindblom R.O.T.C., received recognition as the best rifle shot in the school, was chosen "most popular boy in school", and starred as an actor in several high school plays.

== University of Chicago ==
Rouse enrolled at the University of Chicago in the fall of 1924. He played at the center position for the freshman football team in 1924 and for Amos Alonzo Stagg's Chicago Maroons football team from 1925 to 1927. He played almost every minute of every game in 1926 and was selected as captain of the 1927 Chicago Maroons football team. Against Purdue in 1927, he blocked an extra point to secure Chicago's victory. Rouse later described the block as his greatest football thrill, noting: "I think no one has ever had more pleasure in having a football kicked into the pit of his stomach than I had at that moment." At the end of the 1927 season, he won the 1927 Chicago Tribune Silver Football trophy as the most valuable player in the Big Ten Conference. He was also a unanimous pick for the 1927 All-Big Ten Conference football team.

== Later life ==
Rouse and his wife, the former Helen King (1907-1993), had a daughter, Joanne (born 1932). He later lived in Winnetka, Illinois, and worked for A. B. Dick Company as the vice president in charge of personnel and public relations.
