= Byron Eby =

American football player (1904–1990)

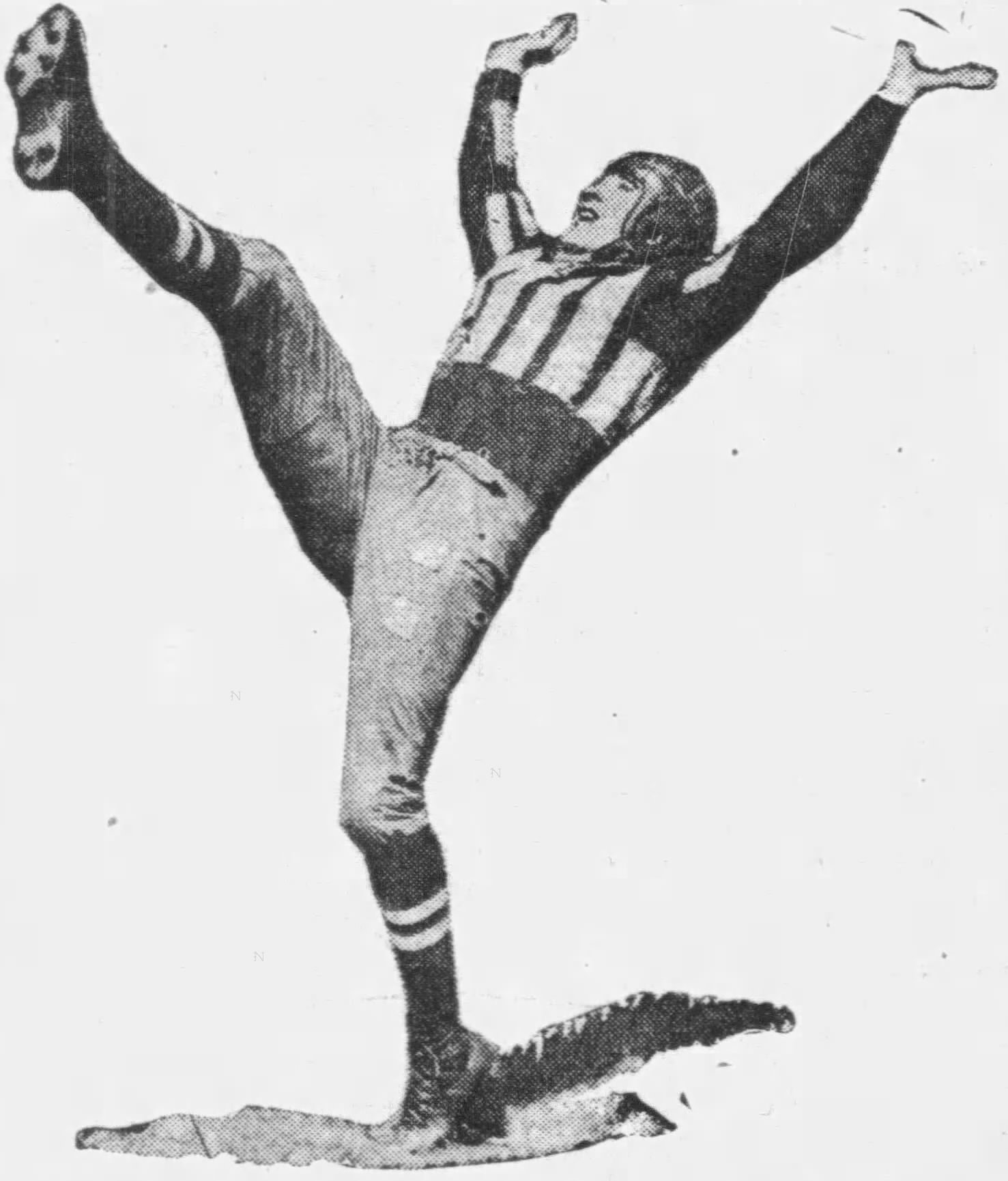
- Eby with Ohio State

No. 20
- Position: Back

Personal information
- Born: December 11, 1904; Circleville, Ohio, U.S.
- Died: September 11, 1990 (aged 85); Chillicothe, Ohio, U.S.
- Listed height: 6 ft 0 in (1.83 m)
- Listed weight: 185 lb (84 kg)

Career information
- High school: Chillicothe (Ohio)
- College: Ohio State (1925–1928)

Career history
- Cincinnati National Guards (1928); Portsmouth Spartans (1930)

Awards and highlights
- Second-team All-Big Ten (1927)
- Stats at Pro Football Reference

Byron Fredrick Eby (December 11, 1904 – September 11, 1990) was an American professional football player who was a back for one season with the Portsmouth Spartans of the National Football League (NFL). He played college football for the Ohio State Buckeyes.

== Early life and college ==
Byron Fredrick Eby was born on December 11, 1904, in Circleville, Ohio. He attended Chillicothe High School in Chillicothe, Ohio.

Eby played college football for the Buckeyes at Ohio State University from 1925 to 1928. He was on the freshman team in 1925 and a three-year letterman from 1926 to 1928.

== Professional career ==
Eby began his professional career by playing for the Cincinnati National Guards in 1928.

Eby signed with the Portsmouth Spartans of the National Football League in 1930. He played in three games, starting one, for the Spartans during the 1930 season, scoring one passing touchdown and one receiving touchdown.

== Personal life ==
Eby died on September 11, 1990, in Chillicothe, Ohio.
