= Bennie Oosterbaan =

American football, basketball, and baseball player and coach (1906–1990)

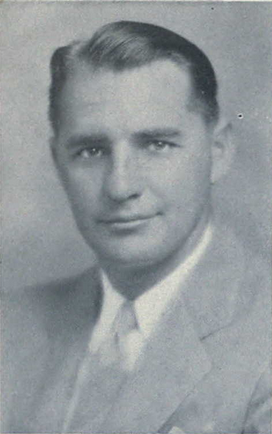
- Oosterbaan pictured in the 1948 edition of Michiganensian, University of Michigan yearbook

Biographical details
- Born: February 24, 1906; Muskegon, Michigan, U.S.
- Died: October 25, 1990 (aged 84); Ann Arbor, Michigan, U.S.

Playing career

Football
- 1925–1927: Michigan

Basketball
- 1925–1928: Michigan

Baseball
- 1927: Michigan
- Positions: End (football); Forward (basketball); First baseman, pitcher (baseball)

Coaching career (HC unless noted)

Football
- 1928–1947: Michigan (assistant)
- 1948–1958: Michigan

Basketball
- 1928–1938: Michigan (assistant)
- 1938–1946: Michigan

Baseball
- N/A: Michigan (freshman)

Head coaching record
- Overall: 63–33–4 (football); 81–72 (basketball)
- Bowls: 1–0

Accomplishments and honors

Championships
- Football: Head coach: National (1948); 3× Big Ten (1948–1950); Assistant: 3× National (1932, 1933, 1947)

Awards
- Coaching and playing career Football: AFCA Coach of the Year (1948); Unanimous All-American (1927); 2× Consensus All-American (1925, 1926); 3× First-team All-Big Ten (1925, 1926, 1927); Big Ten touchdowns leader (1925); Michigan Wolverines Football No. 47 retired; Basketball: 2× All-American (1927–1928); Big Ten scoring champion (1928); Baseball: All-Big Ten (1928); Big Ten batting champion (1928)
- College Football Hall of Fame; Inducted in 1954 (profile)

Benjamin Oosterbaan (/ˈoʊstərbɑːn/ OH-stər-bahn; February 24, 1906 – October 25, 1990) was an American football, basketball, baseball player, and head football and basketball coach for the University of Michigan. He was a three-time All-American for the Michigan Wolverines football program, a two-time All-American for the Michigan Wolverines basketball program, and an All-Big Ten Conference selection for the Michigan Wolverines baseball program. He is widely regarded as one of the greatest football players in Michigan sports history. He was selected by Sports Illustrated as the fourth greatest athlete in the history of the U.S. state of Michigan in 2003, and one of the eleven greatest college football players of the first century of the game (ending in 1968). As a head football coach, Oosterbaan won a national championship with the 1948 team, by way of the Associated Press. He also won in 1932, 1933 and 1947 as an assistant coach.

In high school, he had been an All-American basketball player, a state champion in track and field, and an All-State baseball and football player. During his collegiate athletic career he was a Big Ten batting champion in baseball, the Big Ten scoring champion in basketball, and the Big Ten touchdown leader in football. He was the first University of Michigan athlete to become a first-team All-American in basketball and was the first three-time first-team All-American in football. In addition to his All-American collegiate accolades, Oosterbaan threw three touchdown passes in the dedication game of Michigan Stadium on October 22, 1927.

After his playing career ended, Oosterbaan spent several decades working for the University of Michigan Athletic Department until the 1970s. Oosterbaan served as the football, basketball, and baseball coach for Michigan. As well as winning a national championship in football, his 1950 football team won the 1951 Rose Bowl. He later served as the director of athletic alumni relations.

== Athletic career ==
Born in Muskegon, Michigan, Oosterbaan began his athletic career at Muskegon High School where he was selected by the Detroit News as an All-State end. In his junior year (1923), he led the Muskegon basketball team to a state championship and was named a High School All-American in basketball. He was also an All-State baseball player and state champion discus thrower. According to a Michigan Today article, he probably could have made the 1928 Summer Olympics team in the discus.

At Michigan, Bennie Oosterbaan earned nine letters—three apiece in football, basketball, and baseball. In its obituary of Oosterbaan, The Sporting News described him as a phenomenal student-athlete who in his senior year at Michigan "was captain of the football team, led the Big Ten Conference in scoring in basketball and was the league's leading hitter in baseball, a sport he had not pursued while in high school."

Oosterbaan was both a scholar and an athlete. In 1928, he was awarded the Western Conference Medal of Honor for proficiency as a scholar-athlete. That season, he was captain, most valuable player, and an All-American in football; Big Ten scoring champion and All-American in basketball; and Big Ten batting average champion in what may be the most dominant three sport performance in any conference in a single year.

=== Football ===

After a year on the freshmen football team, he was invited to varsity tryouts. A star receiver and defensive end in a time when the forward pass was still evolving, Oosterbaan united with quarterback Benny Friedman as a passing combination. As a sophomore in 1925, Oosterbaan led the Big Ten with eight touchdowns. That year, the Wolverines outscored their opponents 227–3. The team shut out every team they faced, except a 3–2 defeat to Northwestern at Soldier Field late in the season. Oosterbaan's defensive play was outstanding as well, and he was key in shutting out the Fighting Illini and Red Grange 3–0 in 1925 a year after he scored four touchdowns in the first twelve minutes. Five players from the 1925 team were named All-Americans, including Benny Friedman and Oosterbaan. He was briefly kicked off of the team during the year by an assistant coach for lining up incorrectly before coach Fielding H. Yost brought him back.

In 1926, Friedman and Oosterbaan were both named All-Americans after leading the Wolverines to a 7–1 record and their second consecutive Big Ten Conference championship. That year, his 60-yard run with a recovered fumble helped Michigan to a 7–6 victory over Minnesota in the annual Little Brown Jug game. The Wolverines outscored their opponents, 191–38, and suffered their only loss to Navy, 10–0, in front of 80,000 fans at Baltimore Stadium.

The following year, Friedman had moved on to the NFL, and Oosterbaan was named the team's captain and Most Valuable Player. Oosterbaan was a skilled passer, once throwing for three touchdown passes in the Michigan Stadium dedication game against rival Ohio State on October 22, 1927. Oosterbaan was also selected as an All-American for the third consecutive season. He is one of only two players at Michigan ever to receive consensus All-American honors three times—Anthony Carter being the other. The Wolverines went 20–4 in Oosterbaan's career at Michigan.

=== Basketball ===
In addition to football, Oosterbaan was an All-American basketball forward. He led the Big Ten Conference in scoring (178 points) in his senior year. He was named All-American in both 1927 and 1928 and was a member of Michigan's first back-to-back Western conference champions under E. J. Mather during the 1925–26 and 1926–27 seasons (the latter being Michigan's first outright champion and Oosterbaan's first basketball All-American selection). Oosterbaan was the first Michigan All-American in basketball. He twice recorded double-doubles in this low scoring era.

=== Baseball ===
Oosterbaan was also an All-Conference baseball player who won the Big Ten batting title in 1927. He played both first baseman and pitcher.

== Coaching career ==
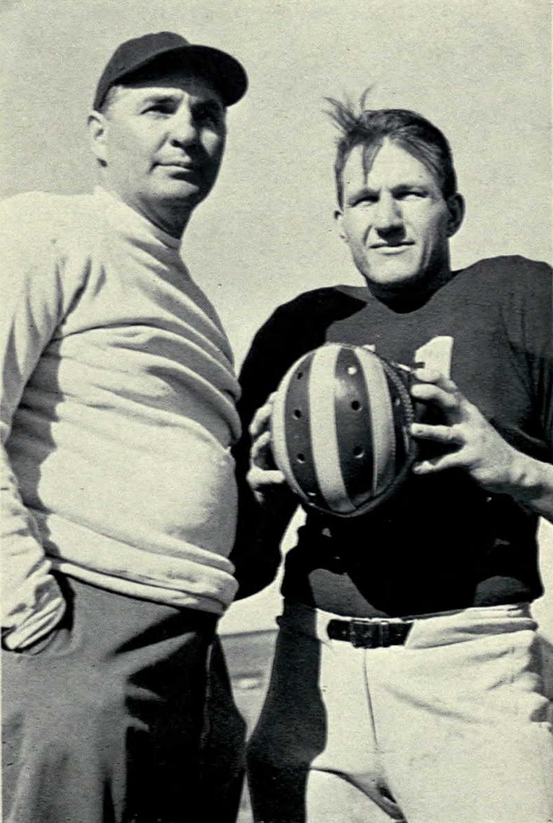
Oosterbaan (left) with Alvin Wistert, 1949

After graduating, Oosterbaan declined offers to play professional football and baseball. According to friend and player Ron Kramer, Oosterbaan grew up in the Dutch Reformed Church and did not sign a professional football or baseball contract "because of his religious background and his mother. Dutch Reformed didn't play football on Sundays."

Instead, Oosterbaan stayed on at the University of Michigan as an assistant coach for the football and basketball teams. He began as an assistant football coach immediately after graduating, and he remained an assistant coach of the football team for twenty years before succeeding Fritz Crisler. After serving 10 seasons as an assistant coach, he also became the head basketball coach in 1938 and served in that capacity until 1946. The basketball team had an 81–72 record while Oosterbaan was the head coach. Oosterbaan employed an uptempo style of play that differed from that of his predecessor Franklin Cappon. Oosterbaan was also head coach of the freshman baseball team.

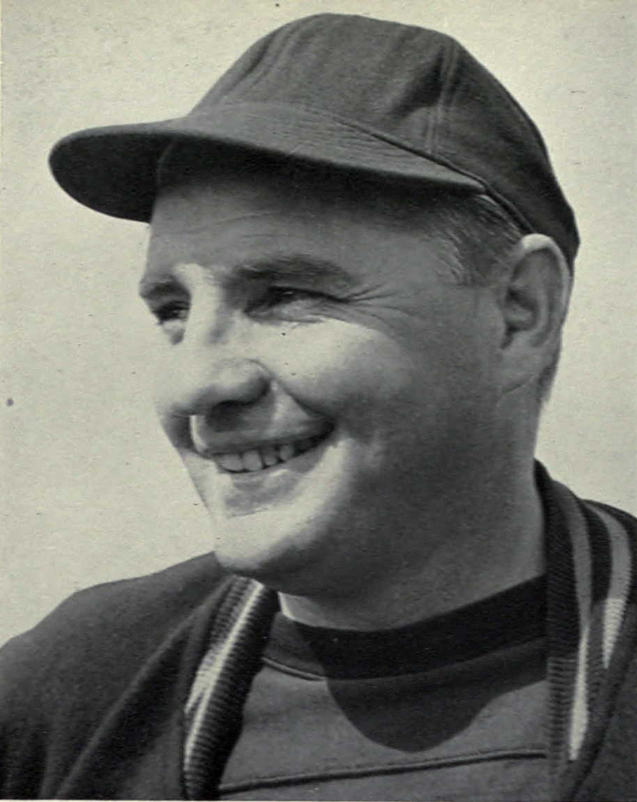
Oosterbaan from 1957 Michiganensian

In 1948, Oosterbaan took over as head coach of the football team at Michigan. Crisler named Oosterbaan as his successor after the 1948 Rose Bowl in which Michigan beat the USC Trojans by a score of 49–0. Crisler described Oosterbaan as "the best offensive mind in college football." Oosterbaan led the Wolverines to an Associated Press (AP) national championship in his first season and won Coach of the Year honors. His 1950 team won the 1951 Rose Bowl after Oosterbaan obtained consent from the Conference to hold extra practices. His teams won Big Ten championships in each of his first three seasons but did not win another under his tenure. He coached at Michigan until 1958, compiling a 63–33–4 record.

Oosterbaan believed success was fleeting. He once was quoted in Time magazine as saying, "I'm on top now, and there is a lot of backslapping. But what of seasons to come? Let me lose the opener or a couple of other games next fall, and then watch how I'm blasted." As coach, he had a reputation as a mild-mannered man who aspired to live by the maxims of his own college football coach, Fielding Yost.

Oosterbaan had a mild-mannered coaching style. "Poise" was his favorite word when it came to inspiring his team. He coached without using a lot of yelling and screaming. Oosterbaan motivated his players without using sarcasm or losing his temper, and rarely used locker room pep talks.

Oosterbaan resigned as the head football coach in 1958. At the time, he said: "The pressure finally got to me. Not the kind that comes from outside. Not from my bosses or the fans. I mean the pressure that builds up inside a head coach whether he wins or loses." After Oosterbaan quit as football coach he was succeeded by Bump Elliott. In 1959, Oosterbaan became Michigan's director of athletic alumni relations and held that position until he retired in 1972.

== Personal life ==
"The will to win is not worth a nickel, unless you have the will to prepare"
"You don't put morale on like a coat. You build it day by day."

— Fielding H. Yost maxims kept in Oosterbaan's notebook

Oosterbaan died in 1990, having spent his entire career associated with the University of Michigan. As one of his obituaries noted, he "went to Ann Arbor as a freshman in 1924—and never left." All-American Ron Kramer said of his former coach: "Bennie Oosterbaan is the Michigan tradition. The man gave his whole life to Michigan." When he died he was the most recent Michigan football coach to have a team ranked #1 in the nation at the end of the season.

Oosterbaan's wife of 57 years, Delmas, had predeceased him a few months earlier on July 23. He was survived by his sister, Grace Hedner; his daughter, Anna Wilson; and two grandsons. Two of his brothers, Guy and Andy, died when Oosterbaan was a young man. While at the University of Michigan he was a member of Alpha Sigma Phi fraternity.

Don Lund, Michigan's associate athletic director for alumni relations who also played basketball for Oosterbaan said: "There's no question he was the greatest athlete we ever had here at Michigan." Ohio State Buckeyes football coach Woody Hayes once said of Oosterbaan: "If he weren't from Michigan, I'd like to have my own son play for him."

== Honors and awards ==
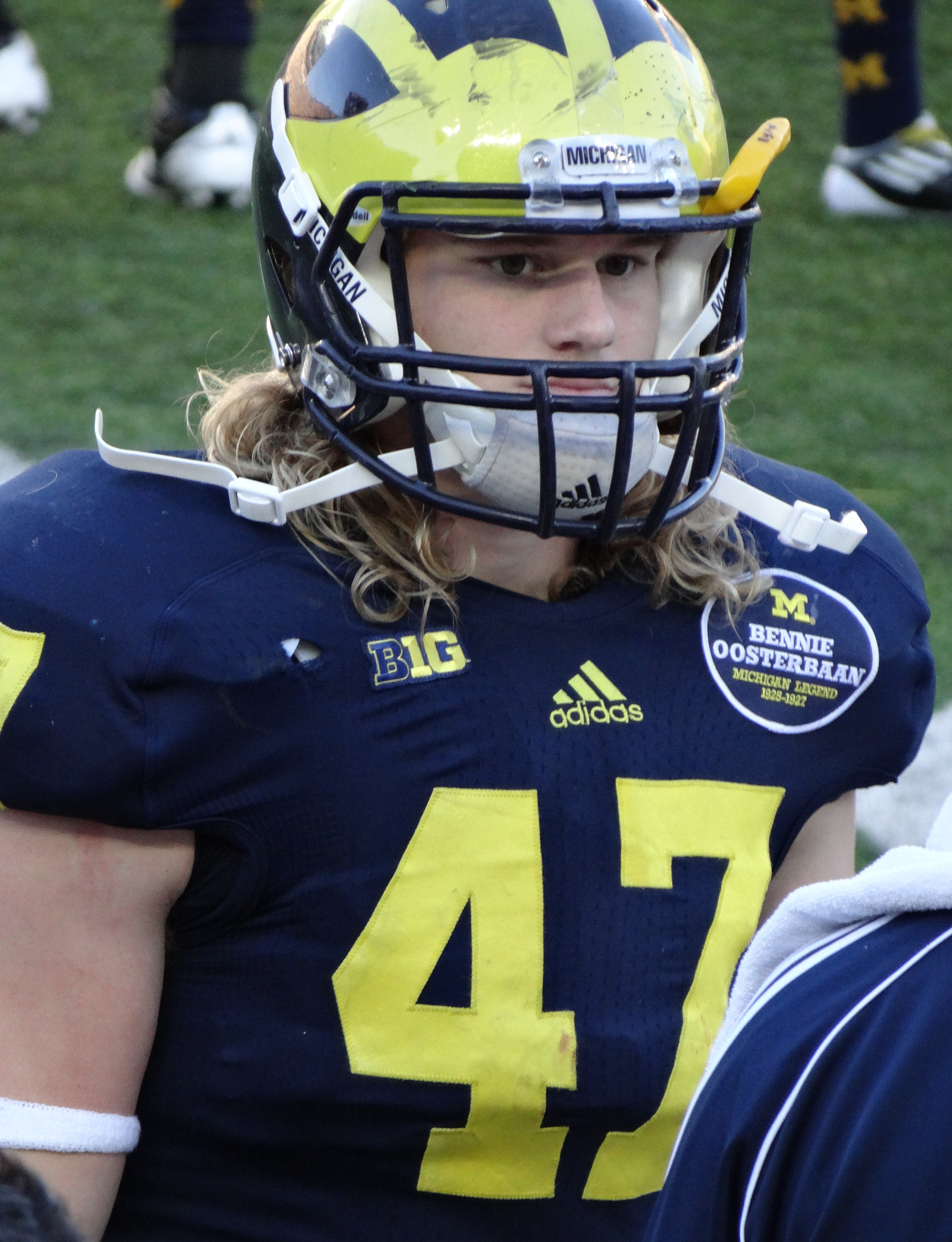
Jake Ryan wearing the Oosterbaan legend jersey in 2012

Bennie Oosterbaan's jersey number 47 was the first Michigan football jersey number retired, and until 2011, it was one of only five numbers retired by the Michigan football program. In 2012, the Michigan Football Legends program led to the reissue of the No. 47 jersey to linebacker Jake Ryan, bearing a patch (pictured at right) honoring Oosterbaan. Each player to wear the jersey will also dress at a locker bearing a plaque with Oosterbaan's name and his time of tenure at Michigan.

In 1954, he was inducted into the College Football Hall of Fame. He was a member of the fourth class of inductees into the Michigan Sports Hall of Fame in 1958. Oosterbaan was a member of the inaugural 1978 class of inductees into the University of Michigan Athletic Hall of Honor. The Michigan football indoor practice facility was named Oosterbaan Field House. In 2000, he was selected to the Michigan All-Century team.

American sports-writer, Grantland Rice selected him and Don Hutson as the ends for the all-time All-American team of the first half of the 20th century. A poll of Michigan alumni and friends in 1979 selected Oosterbaan as Michigan's greatest all-time football player. In 1969, Sports Illustrated named him to the eleven-man All-Century team for the period 1869–1968.

In 1999, Sports Illustrated published a list of "The 50 Greatest Sports Figures From Michigan" (in all sports), and ranked Oosterbaan fourth on the list behind Joe Louis, Magic Johnson and Charlie Gehringer. He was the highest ranked football player, ahead of Michigan Wolverines Ron Kramer (No. 7), Fielding H. Yost (No. 9), Rick Leach (No. 22), Fritz Crisler (No. 31), and Harry Kipke (No. 40).

== Head coaching record ==
=== Football ===
Year	Team	Overall	Conference	Standing	Bowl/playoffs	Coaches^{#}	AP^{°}
Michigan Wolverines (Big Ten Conference) (1948–1958)
1948	Michigan	9–0	6–0	1st			1
1949	Michigan	6–2–1	4–1–1	T–1st			7
1950	Michigan	6–3–1	4–1–1	1st	W Rose	6	9
1951	Michigan	4–5	4–2	4th			
1952	Michigan	5–4	4–2	T–4th			
1953	Michigan	6–3	3–3	T–5th		19	20
1954	Michigan	6–3	5–2	T–2nd		15	15
1955	Michigan	7–2	5–2	3rd		13	12
1956	Michigan	7–2	5–2	2nd		7	7
1957	Michigan	5–3–1	3–3–1	6th			
1958	Michigan	2–6–1	1–5–1	8th			
Michigan:		63–33–4	44–23–4				
Total:		63–33–4					
National championship Conference title Conference division title or championship game berth
^{#}Rankings from final Coaches Poll.; ^{°}Rankings from final AP Poll.

=== Basketball ===
Record table
Season	Team	Overall	Conference	Standing	Postseason
Michigan Wolverines (Big Ten Conference) (1938–1946)
1938–39	Michigan	11–9	4–8	T–7th	
1939–40	Michigan	13–7	6–6	6th	
1940–41	Michigan	9–10	5–7	7th	
1941–42	Michigan	6–14	5–10	T–7th	
1942–43	Michigan	10–8	4–8	8th	
1943–44	Michigan	8–10	5–7	T–6th	
1944–45	Michigan	12–7	5–7	5th	
1945–46	Michigan	12–7	6–6	7th	
Michigan:		81–72	40–59		
Total:		81–72			

== See also ==
- List of Michigan Wolverines football All-Americans
