= 1925 All-Big Ten Conference football team =

American college football all-star team

The 1925 All-Big Ten Conference football team consists of American football players selected to the All-Big Ten Conference teams chosen by various selectors for the 1925 Big Ten Conference football season.

== All Big-Ten selections ==
=== Ends ===
- Bennie Oosterbaan, Michigan (AP-1; BE-1; BTW-1; NB-1; JW; UP-1; WE-1)
- Chuck Kassel, Illinois (AP-1; BE-1; BTW-1; UP-1; WE-1)
- Dick Romey, Iowa (AP-2; BE-2; JW; NB-1; WE-3)
- George Fisher, Indiana (BE-2)
- Jefferson Burrus, Wisconsin (BTW-2; UP-2)
- Roger B. Wheeler, Minnesota (BTW-2)
- Cookie Cunningham, Ohio State (AP-2)
- Elmer A. Lampe, Chicago (WE-2)
- William Flora, Michigan (WE-2)
- Frank E. Mathews, Northwestern (WE-3)

=== Tackles ===
- Fred Henderson, Chicago (AP-1; BE-1; BTW-1; JW; NB-1; UP-1; WE-1)
- Tom Edwards, Michigan (AP-2; BE-2; BTW-1; NB-1; UP-1; WE-1)
- Harry Hawkins, Michigan (AP-1; BE-1; BTW-1; JW; UP-2; WE-2)
- Elmer A. Lampe, Chicago (BE-2; UP-2 [end])
- Paul Nelson, Wisconsin (BTW-2; WE-3)
- J. T. Bolan, Purdue (UP-2)
- John H. Nichols, Ohio State (AP-2)
- Charles A. Brown, Illinois (WE-2)
- Fred Hobscheid, Chicago (WE-3)

=== Guards ===
- Ed Hess, Ohio State (AP-1; BE-1; BTW-1; JW; NB-1; UP-1; WE-1)
- Bernie Shively, Illinois (AP-1; BE-1; JW)
- Sam Hibben, Chicago (NB-1)
- Ray J. Stipek, Wisconsin (AP-2; BE-2; BTW-2; WE-2)
- Len Walsh, Minnesota (BE-2; WE-1)
- John Lovette, Michigan (BTW-2; WE-3)
- Paul Kraguski, Iowa (UP-2, WE-3)
- Merwin Mitterwallner, Illinois (UP-2; WE-2)

=== Centers ===
- Robert J. Brown, Michigan (AP-1; BE-1; BTW-1 [guard]; JW; NB-1; UP-1 [guard]; WE-2)
- Tim Lowry, Northwestern (AP-2; BE-2; BTW-1; UP-1; WE-1)
- Alex W. Klein, Ohio State (BTW-2)
- Hal Griffen, Iowa (AP-2 [guard], UP-2)
- Robert Reitsch, Illinois (WE-3)

=== Quarterbacks ===
- Benny Friedman, Michigan (AP-1; BE-1; BTW-1; JW; UP-1; WE-1)
- Mel Taube, Purdue (BE-2)
- John Schirmer, Iowa (WE-2)

=== Halfbacks ===
- Red Grange, Illinois (AP-1; BE-1; BTW-1; NB-1 [quarterback]; JW; UP-1; WE-1)
- Austin McCarty, Chicago (AP-1; BE-1; BTW-1 [fullback]; WE-1 [fullback])
- Wesley Fry, Iowa (AP-2 [fullback]; UP-1)
- Ralph Baker, Northwestern (NB-1)
- Harold V. Almquist, Minnesota (BTW-1; UP-2; WE-3 [qb])
- Marty Karow, Ohio State (BE-2; JW; WE-2)
- Nick Kutsch, Iowa (BTW-2 [quarterback]; NB-1; WE-3)
- Doyle Harmon, Wisconsin (AP-2; BE-2; UP-2 [quarterback]; WE-1)
- Chester "Cotton" Wilcox, Purdue (AP-2 [quarterback]; BTW-2, WE-3)
- Larry Marks, Indiana (WE-2)

=== Fullbacks ===
- Tiny Lewis, Northwestern (AP-1; BE-2; BTW-2 [halfback]; UP-1; WE-2)
- Herb Joesting, Minnesota (AP-2; BE-1; UP-2)
- Bo Molenda, Michigan (BTW-2; NB-1; UP-2 [halfback]; WE-3)
- Earl Britton, Illinois (JW)

== See also ==
- 1925 College Football All-America Team
- 1925 All-Western college football team

== Key ==
AP = Associated Press, "as selected by seven of the Big Ten coaches, for the Associated Press tonight"

BE = Billy Evans with counsel from nine of the ten Big Ten coaches

BTW = Big Ten Weekly, selected by Albon Holden in the Big Ten Weekly, a publication devoted entirely to the athletics of the leading institutions of the west"

JW = John Wilce, head coach at Ohio State

NB = Norman E. Brown, sports editor of the Central Press Association

UP = United Press, "according to a consensus of opinion as expressed by coaches, trainers, athletic directors, and critics as compiled today by the United Press"

WE = Walter Eckersall

Bold = consensus first-team selection by at least three of the six selectors listed above
