= Vic Gustafson =

American football player and coach

Biographical details
- Born: c. 1905; Illinois, U.S.
- Education: Wheaton College

Playing career

Football
- 1925–1927: Northwestern
- Positions: Halfback, quarterback

Coaching career (HC unless noted)

Football
- 1928: Wheaton (IL) (backfield)
- 1929–1934: Wheaton
- 1935–?: Wheaton (assistant)

Basketball
- 1928–?: Wheaton (IL) (assistant)

Track and field
- 1928–?: Wheaton (IL) (assistant)

Head coaching record
- Overall: 14–27–5

Victor Gustafson (c. 1905 – ?) was an American college football player and coach. He served as the head football coach at Wheaton College in Wheaton, Illinois for six seasons, from 1929 to 1934, compiling a record of 14–27–5.

A native of Wheaton, Illinois, Gustafson played high school football alongside Red Grange. He attended Northwestern University, where he played football, and was captain of the 1927 Northwestern Wildcats football team. He went to Wheaton College in 1928 as backfield coach for the football team, assistant basketball coach, and head coach in track and field. The following year, he was promoted to head football coach. Gustafson was succeeded by Wendell Smith as Wheaton's head football coach in 1935, but continued to assistant in coaching the team.

== Head coaching record ==
Year	Team	Overall	Conference	Standing	Bowl/playoffs
Wheaton Crusaders (Illinois Intercollegiate Athletic Conference) (1929–1934)
1929	Wheaton	2–6–1	1–4–1	T–18th	
1930	Wheaton	2–6	0–4	20th	
1931	Wheaton	3–5	0–3	22nd	
1932	Wheaton	4–3	1–3	T–15th	
1933	Wheaton	2–2–3	1–2–2	T–15th	
1934	Wheaton	1–5–1	0–4–1	18th	
Wheaton:		14–27–5	3–20–4		
Total:		14–27–5			
