= Carroll Ringwalt =

American football player (1907–1990)

Profile
- Positions: Center, guard

Personal information
- Born: December 15, 1907; Bedford, Indiana, U.S.
- Died: June 26, 1990 (aged 82); Indianapolis, Indiana, U.S.
- Listed height: 6 ft 0 in (1.83 m)
- Listed weight: 210 lb (95 kg)

Career information
- College: Indiana

Career history
- Portsmouth Spartans (1930); Frankford Yellow Jackets (1931)
- Stats at Pro Football Reference

Carroll Walter Ringwalt (December 15, 1907 – June 26, 1990) was an American football player.

Ringwalt was born in 1907 in Bedford, Indiana. He played college football as a center for Indiana University from 1927 to 1929.

He then played professional football in the National Football League (NFL) as a center and guard for the Portsmouth Spartans in 1930 and Frankford Yellow Jackets in 1931. He appeared in ten NFL games, four as a starter.

Ringwalt was married to Frances Jane Curran. They had two children. After retiring from football, Ringwalt worked in finance for almost 40 years in Indianapolis. He also served in the Army during World War II. He retired in 1980. He died in 1990 at his home in Indianapolis.
