= List of All-Big Ten Conference football teams =

The All-Big Ten Conference football team is an annual Big Ten Conference honor bestowed on the best players in the conference following every college football season.

== Seasons ==
Following is a list of all-conference teams in the history of the Big Ten:

- 1898 All-Western college football team
- 1899 All-Western college football team
- 1900 All-Western college football team
- 1901 All-Western college football team
- 1902 All-Western college football team
- 1903 All-Western college football team
- 1904 All-Western college football team
- 1905 All-Western college football team
- 1906 All-Western college football team
- 1907 All-Western college football team
- 1908 All-Western college football team
- 1909 All-Western college football team
- 1910 All-Western college football team
- 1911 All-Western college football team
- 1912 All-Western college football team
- 1913 All-Western college football team
- 1914 All-Western college football team
- 1915 All-Western college football team
- 1916 All-Western Conference football team
- 1917 All-Big Ten Conference football team
- 1918 All-Big Ten Conference football team
- 1919 All-Big Ten Conference football team
- 1920 All-Big Ten Conference football team
- 1921 All-Big Ten Conference football team
- 1922 All-Big Ten Conference football team
- 1923 All-Big Ten Conference football team
- 1924 All-Big Ten Conference football team
- 1925 All-Big Ten Conference football team
- 1926 All-Big Ten Conference football team
- 1927 All-Big Ten Conference football team
- 1928 All-Big Ten Conference football team
- 1929 All-Big Ten Conference football team
- 1930 All-Big Ten Conference football team
- 1931 All-Big Ten Conference football team
- 1932 All-Big Ten Conference football team
- 1933 All-Big Ten Conference football team
- 1934 All-Big Ten Conference football team
- 1935 All-Big Ten Conference football team
- 1936 All-Big Ten Conference football team
- 1937 All-Big Ten Conference football team
- 1938 All-Big Ten Conference football team
- 1939 All-Big Ten Conference football team
- 1940 All-Big Ten Conference football team
- 1941 All-Big Ten Conference football team
- 1942 All-Big Ten Conference football team
- 1943 All-Big Ten Conference football team
- 1944 All-Big Ten Conference football team
- 1945 All-Big Ten Conference football team
- 1946 All-Big Nine Conference football team
- 1947 All-Big Nine Conference football team
- 1948 All-Big Nine Conference football team
- 1949 All-Big Nine Conference football team
- 1950 All-Big Ten Conference football team
- 1951 All-Big Ten Conference football team
- 1952 All-Big Ten Conference football team
- 1953 All-Big Ten Conference football team
- 1954 All-Big Ten Conference football team
- 1955 All-Big Ten Conference football team
- 1956 All-Big Ten Conference football team
- 1957 All-Big Ten Conference football team
- 1958 All-Big Ten Conference football team
- 1959 All-Big Ten Conference football team
- 1960 All-Big Ten Conference football team
- 1961 All-Big Ten Conference football team
- 1962 All-Big Ten Conference football team
- 1963 All-Big Ten Conference football team
- 1964 All-Big Ten Conference football team
- 1965 All-Big Ten Conference football team
- 1966 All-Big Ten Conference football team
- 1967 All-Big Ten Conference football team
- 1968 All-Big Ten Conference football team
- 1969 All-Big Ten Conference football team
- 1970 All-Big Ten Conference football team
- 1971 All-Big Ten Conference football team
- 1972 All-Big Ten Conference football team
- 1973 All-Big Ten Conference football team
- 1974 All-Big Ten Conference football team
- 1975 All-Big Ten Conference football team
- 1976 All-Big Ten Conference football team
- 1977 All-Big Ten Conference football team
- 1978 All-Big Ten Conference football team
- 1979 All-Big Ten Conference football team
- 1980 All-Big Ten Conference football team
- 1981 All-Big Ten Conference football team
- 1982 All-Big Ten Conference football team
- 1983 All-Big Ten Conference football team
- 1984 All-Big Ten Conference football team
- 1985 All-Big Ten Conference football team
- 1986 All-Big Ten Conference football team
- 1987 All-Big Ten Conference football team
- 1988 All-Big Ten Conference football team
- 1989 All-Big Ten Conference football team
- 1990 All-Big Ten Conference football team
- 1991 All-Big Ten Conference football team
- 1992 All-Big Ten Conference football team
- 1993 All-Big Ten Conference football team
- 1994 All-Big Ten Conference football team
- 1995 All-Big Ten Conference football team
- 1996 All-Big Ten Conference football team
- 1997 All-Big Ten Conference football team
- 1998 All-Big Ten Conference football team
- 1999 All-Big Ten Conference football team
- 2000 All-Big Ten Conference football team
- 2001 All-Big Ten Conference football team
- 2002 All-Big Ten Conference football team
- 2003 All-Big Ten Conference football team
- 2004 All-Big Ten Conference football team
- 2005 All-Big Ten Conference football team
- 2006 All-Big Ten Conference football team
- 2007 All-Big Ten Conference football team
- 2008 All-Big Ten Conference football team
- 2009 All-Big Ten Conference football team
- 2010 All-Big Ten Conference football team
- 2011 All-Big Ten Conference football team
- 2012 All-Big Ten Conference football team
- 2013 All-Big Ten Conference football team
- 2014 All-Big Ten Conference football team
- 2015 All-Big Ten Conference football team
- 2016 All-Big Ten Conference football team
- 2017 All-Big Ten Conference football team
- 2018 All-Big Ten Conference football team
- 2019 All-Big Ten Conference football team
- 2020 All-Big Ten Conference football team
- 2021 All-Big Ten Conference football team
- 2022 All-Big Ten Conference football team
- 2023 All-Big Ten Conference football team
- 2024 All-Big Ten Conference football team
- 2025 All-Big Ten Conference football team
