= 1925 Big Ten Conference football season =

- Sport: Football
- Teams: 10
- Champion: Michigan
- Season MVP: Tim Lowry

Football seasons

1925 Big Ten Conference football standings
	Conf.					Overall
Team	W		L		T	W		L		T
No. 2 Michigan $	5	–	1	–	0	7	–	1	–	0
Northwestern	3	–	1	–	0	5	–	3	–	0
No. 8 Wisconsin	3	–	1	–	1	6	–	1	–	1
Chicago	2	–	2	–	1	3	–	4	–	1
Illinois	2	–	2	–	0	5	–	3	–	0
Iowa	2	–	2	–	0	5	–	3	–	0
Minnesota	1	–	1	–	1	5	–	2	–	1
Ohio State	1	–	3	–	1	4	–	3	–	1
Indiana	0	–	3	–	1	3	–	4	–	1
Purdue	0	–	3	–	1	3	–	4	–	1
$ – Conference champion; Rankings from Dickinson System

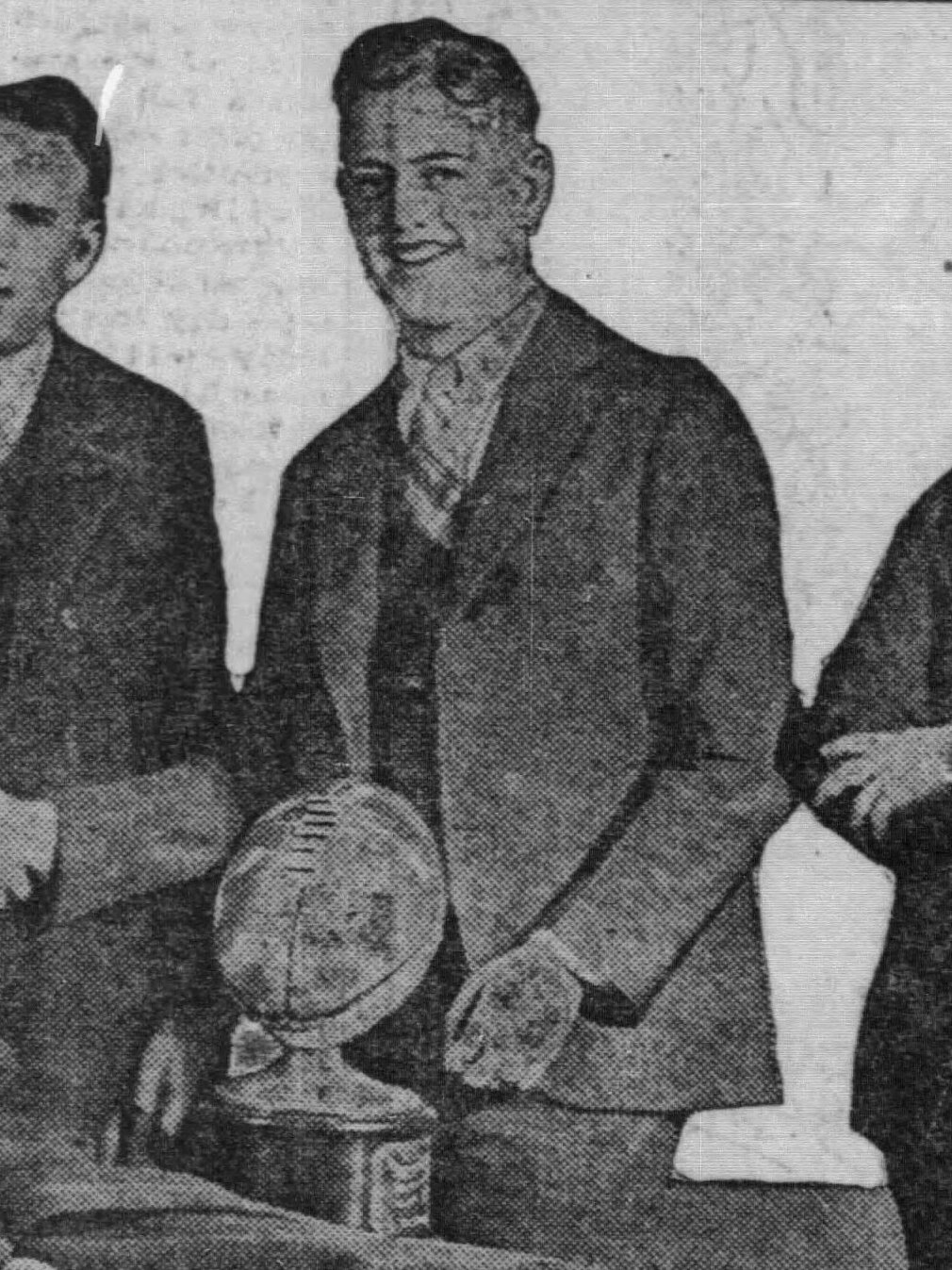
Tim Lowry of the Northwestern Wildcats receiving the Chicago Tribune Silver Football for the 1925 season

The 1925 Big Ten Conference football season was the 30th season of college football played by the member schools of the Big Ten Conference (also known as the Western Conference) and was a part of the 1925 college football season. Over the course of the season, Big Ten teams played 36 non-conference games, compiling a 27–9 record (.750) in those games.

The 1925 Big Ten Conference champion was Michigan. The team compiled a 7–1 record, shut out seven opponents, and outscored opponents by a combined score of 227 to 3. The only points allowed by the team were in a 3 to 2 loss to Northwestern in a game played in a heavy rainstorm on a field covered in mud five or six inches deep in some places. Quarterback Benny Friedman and left end Bennie Oosterbaan, sometimes referred to as "The Benny-to-Bennie Show," were both consensus All-Americans and became known as one of the greatest passing combinations in college football history.

Northwestern's center, Tim Lowry, won the Chicago Tribune Silver Football trophy as the Big Ten's most valuable player. Lowry received 23 votes; Benny Friedman of Michigan finished second with 18 votes. Four Big Ten players were consensus picks for the 1925 All-America team:Benny Friedman of Michigan at quarterback; Red Grange of Illinois at halfback; Bennie Oosterbaan of Michigan at end; and Ed Hess of Ohio State at guard.

== Season overview ==
=== Results and team statistics ===
Conf. Rank	Team	Head coach	Overall record	Conf. record	PPG	PAG
1	Michigan	Fielding H. Yost	7–1	5–1	**28.4**	**0.4**
2	Wisconsin	George Little	6–1–1	3–1–1	16.4	6.3
3	Northwestern	Glenn Thistlethwaite	5–3	3–1	10.1	8.6
4	Chicago	Amos A. Stagg	3–4–1	2–2–1	5.5	9.5
5	Minnesota	Clarence Spears	5-2-1	1-1-1	22.0	10.6
6 (tie)	Illinois	Robert Zuppke	5–3	2–2	12.3	7.4
6 (tie)	Iowa	Burt Ingwersen	5–3	2–2	15.1	9.3
8	Ohio State	John Wilce	4–3–1	1–3–1	6.9	5.6
9 (tie)	Purdue	James Phelan	3–4–1	0–3–1	14.9	4.9
9 (tie)	Indiana	Bill Ingram	3–4–1	0–3–1	12.8	14.4

Key
PPG = Average of points scored per game
PAG = Average of points allowed per game

=== Regular season ===
Index to colors and formatting
Non-conference matchup; Big Ten member won
Non-conference matchup; Big Ten member lost
Conference matchup
Big Ten teams displayed in **bold**

==== October 3 ====
All 10 conference teams opened their seasons on October 3, playing 10 games against non-conference opponents, resulting in eight wins and two losses.

Date	Home team	Visiting team	Site	Result	Attendance	Source
October 3	Michigan	Michigan State	Ferry Field, Ann Arbor, MI	**W** 39–0	30,000	
October 3	Northwestern	South Dakota	Dyche Stadium, Evanston, IL	**W** 14–7	18,000	
October 3	Wisconsin	Iowa State	Camp Randall Stadium, Madison, WI	**W** 30–0	10,000	
October 3	Chicago	Kentucky	Stagg Field, Chicago, IL	**W** 9–0	32,000	
October 3	Illinois	Nebraska	Memorial Stadium, Champaign, IL	**L** 0–14	40,000	
October 3	Iowa	Arkansas	Iowa Field, Iowa City, IA	**W** 26–0		
October 3	Minnesota	North Dakota	Memorial Stadium, Minneapolis, MN	**W** 25–6	20,000	
October 3	Ohio State	Ohio Wesleyan	Ohio Stadium, Columbus, OH	**W** 10–3	45,000	
October 3	Indiana	Indiana State	Memorial Stadium, Bloomington, IN	**W** 31–0		
October 3	Purdue	Wabash	Ross–Ade Stadium, West Lafayette, IN	**L** 7–13		

==== October 10 ====
On October 10, the conference teams played two intra-conference games and six non-conference games. The non-conference games resulted in six victories and no losses.

Date	Home team	Visiting team	Site	Result	Attendance	Source
October 10	Michigan	**Indiana**	Ferry Field, Ann Arbor, MI	**W** 63–0	36,000	
October 10	Chicago	**Ohio State**	Stagg Field, Chicago, IL	**T** 3–3	35,000	
October 10	Northwestern	Carleton	Dyche Stadium, Evanston, IL	**W** 17–0	11,000	
October 10	Wisconsin	Franklin University	Camp Randall Stadium, Madison, WI	**W** 35–0		
October 10	Illinois	Butler	Memorial Stadium, Champaign, IL	**W** 16–13	12,599	
October 10	Iowa	Saint Louis	Iowa Field, Iowa City, IA	**W** 41–0		
October 10	Purdue	DePauw	Ross–Ade Stadium, West Lafayette, IN	**W** 39–0		

==== October 17 ====
On October 17, the conference teams played three intra-conference games and four non-conference games. The non-conference games resulted in three victories and one loss.

Date	Home team	Visiting team	Site	Result	Attendance	Source
October 17	Wisconsin	**Michigan**	Camp Randall Stadium, Madison, WI	**L** 0–21	44,000	
October 17	Chicago	**Northwestern**	Stagg Field, Chicago, IL	**W** 6–0	34,000	
October 17	Iowa	**Illinois**	Iowa Field, Iowa City, IA	**W** 12–10	24,738	
October 17	Minnesota	Wabash	Memorial Stadium, Minneapolis, MN	**W** 32–6	18,000	
October 17	Ohio State	Columbia	Ohio Stadium, Columbus, OH	**W** 9–0		
October 17	Indiana	Syracuse	Memorial Stadium, Bloomington, IN	**W** 14–0	8,000	
October 17	Purdue	Rose Polytechnic	Ross–Ade Stadium, West Lafayette, IN	**W** 44–0		

==== October 24 ====
On October 24, the conference teams played three intra-conference games and four non-conference games. The non-conference games resulted in one victory and three losses.

Date	Home team	Visiting team	Site	Result	Attendance	Source
October 24	**Illinois**	**Michigan**	Memorial Stadium, Champaign, IL	**L** 0–3	66,609	
October 24	**Wisconsin**	**Purdue**	Camp Randall Stadium, Madison, WI	**W** 7–0	14,000	
October 24	**Ohio State**	**Iowa**	Ohio Stadium, Columbus, OH	**L** 0–15	33,000	
October 24	**Northwestern**	Tulane	Stagg Field, Chicago, IL	**L** 7–18	15,000	
October 24	Penn	**Chicago**	Franklin Field, Philadelphia, PA	**L** 0–7	55,000	
October 24	**Minnesota**	Notre Dame	Memorial Stadium, Minneapolis, MN	**L** 7–19	52,000	
October 24	**Indiana**	Miami (OH)	Memorial Stadium, Bloomington, IN	**W** 25–7		

==== October 31 ====
On October 31, the conference teams played three intra-conference games and four non-conference games. The non-conference games resulted in four victories and no losses.

Date	Home team	Visiting team	Site	Result	Attendance	Source
October 31	**Northwestern**	**Indiana**	Dyche Stadium, Evanston, IL	**W** 17–14		
October 31	**Minnesota**	**Wisconsin**	Memorial Stadium, Minneapolis, MN	**T** 12–12	40,000	
October 31	**Chicago**	**Purdue**	Stagg Field, Chicago, IL	**W** 6–0	34,000	
October 31	**Michigan**	Navy	Ferry Field, Ann Arbor, MI	**W** 54–0	47,000	
October 31	Penn	**Illinois**	Franklin Field, Philadelphia, PA	**W** 24–2	60,000	
October 31	**Iowa**	Wabash	Iowa Field, Iowa City, IA	**W** 28–7		
October 31	**Ohio State**	Wooster	Ohio Stadium, Columbus, OH	**W** 17–0	17,000	

==== November 7 ====
On November 7, the conference teams played four intra-conference games and two non-conference games. The non-conference games resulted in two victories and no losses.

Date	Home team	Visiting team	Site	Result	Attendance	Source
November 7	Northwestern	**Michigan**	Soldier Field, Chicago, IL	**W** 3–2	40,000	
November 7	Iowa	**Wisconsin**	Iowa Field, Iowa City, IA	**L** 0–6		
November 7	Illinois	**Chicago**	Memorial Stadium, Champaign, IL	**W** 13–6	68,864	
November 7	Ohio State	**Indiana**	Ohio Stadium, Columbus, OH	**W** 7–0	30,500	
November 7	Minnesota	Butler	Memorial Stadium, Minneapolis, MN	**W** 33–7	20,000	
November 7	Purdue	Franklin	Ross–Ade Stadium, West Lafayette, IN	**W** 20–0		

==== November 14 ====
On November 14, the conference teams played three intra-conference games and four non-conference games. The non-conference games resulted in three victories and one loss.

Date	Home team	Visiting team	Site	Result	Attendance	Source
November 14	Michigan	**Ohio State**	Ferry Field, Ann Arbor, MI	**W** 10–0	59,000	
November 14	Purdue	**Northwestern**	Ross–Ade Stadium, West Lafayette, IN	**L** 9–13		
November 14	Minnesota	**Iowa**	Memorial Stadium, Minneapolis, MN	**W** 33–0	45,000	
November 14	Wisconsin	Michigan State	Camp Randall Stadium, Madison, WI	**W** 21–10		
November 14	Chicago	Dartmouth	Stagg Field, Chicago, IL	**L** 7–33	34,000	
November 14	Illinois	Wabash	Memorial Stadium, Champaign, IL	**W** 21–0	20,466	
November 14	Indiana	Rose Polytechnic	Memorial Stadium, Bloomington, IN	**W** 32–7		

==== November 21 ====
On November 21, the conference teams played four intra-conference games and two non-conference games. The non-conference games resulted in two losses.

Date	Home team	Visiting team	Site	Result	Attendance	Source
November 21	**Michigan**	Minnesota	Ferry Field, Ann Arbor, MI	**W** 35–0	47,000	
November 21	**Chicago**	Wisconsin	Stagg Field, Chicago, IL	**L** 7-20	34,000	
November 21	**Ohio State**	Illinois	Ohio Stadium, Columbus, OH	**L** 9–14	72,657	
November 21	**Indiana**	Purdue	Memorial Stadium, Bloomington, IN	**T** 0–0	15,000	
November 21	Notre Dame	Northwestern	Cartier Field, South Bend, IN	**L** 10–13	32,000	
November 21	USC	Iowa	Los Angeles Memorial Coliseum, Los Angeles, CA	**L** 0–18	66,000	

=== Bowl games ===
No Big Ten teams participated in any bowl games during the 1925 season.

== All-Big Ten players ==
The following players were picked by multiple selectors as first-team players on the 1925 All-Big Ten Conference football team. Players selected as first-team players by all seven selectors are shown in bold.

- **Bennie Oosterbaan**, end, Michigan (AP, BE, BTW, NB, JW, UP, WE)
- Chuck Kassel, end, Illinois (AP, BE, BTW, UP, WE)
- Dick Romey, end, Iowa (JW, NB)
- **Fred "Bub" Henderson**, tackle, Chicago (AP, BE, BTW, JW, NB, UP, WE)
- Tom Edwards, tackle, Michigan (BTW, NB, UP, WE)
- Harry Hawkins, tackle, Michigan (AP, BE, BTW, JW)
- **Ed Hess**, guard, Ohio State (AP, BE, BTW, JW, NB, UP, WE)
- Bernie Shively, guard, Illinois (AP, BE, JW)
- Robert J. Brown, center/guard, Michigan (AP, BE, BTW, JW, NB, UP)
- Tim Lowry, Northwestern (BTW, UP, WE)
- Benny Friedman, quarterback, Michigan (AP, BE, BTW, JW, UP, WE)
- **Red Grange**, halfback, Illinois (AP, BE, BTW, NB, JW, UP, WE)
- Austin McCarty, halfback/fullback, Chicago (AP, BE, BTW, WE)
- Loren L. Lewis, fullback, Northwestern (AP, UP)

== All-Americans ==
Four Big Ten players were consensus first-team selections to the 1925 College Football All-America Team:

- Bennie Oosterbaan, end, Michigan (AAB, AP, COL, FW, INS, NEA, UP, A&S, BE, NB, RKN, Sun, WC, WE)
- Ed Hess, guard, Ohio State (COL, LIB, NEA, UP, A&S, BE, NB, HR)
- Benny Friedman, quarterback, Michigan (AAB, LIB, UP, RKN, Sun, SW)
- Red Grange, halfback, Illinois (AP, COL, FW, INS, LIB, NEA, UP, A&S, BE, HR, NB, RKN, Sun, SW, WC, WE)

Other Big Ten players receiving first-team honors from at least one selector included:

- Dick Romey, end, Iowa (LIB)
- Cookie Cunningham, end, Ohio State (HR)
- Harry Hawkins, tackle, Michigan (FW)
- Tom Edwards, tackle, Michigan (WE)
- Fred "Bub" Henderson, tackle, Chicago (NB)
- Merwin Mitterwallner, guard, Illinois (HR)
- Robert Brown, center, Michigan (INS, LIB, NEA, A&S, BE, NB, SW)
- Tim Lowry, center, Northwestern (FW)
