= 1925 Michigan Wolverines football team =

American college football season

1925 Michigan Wolverines football
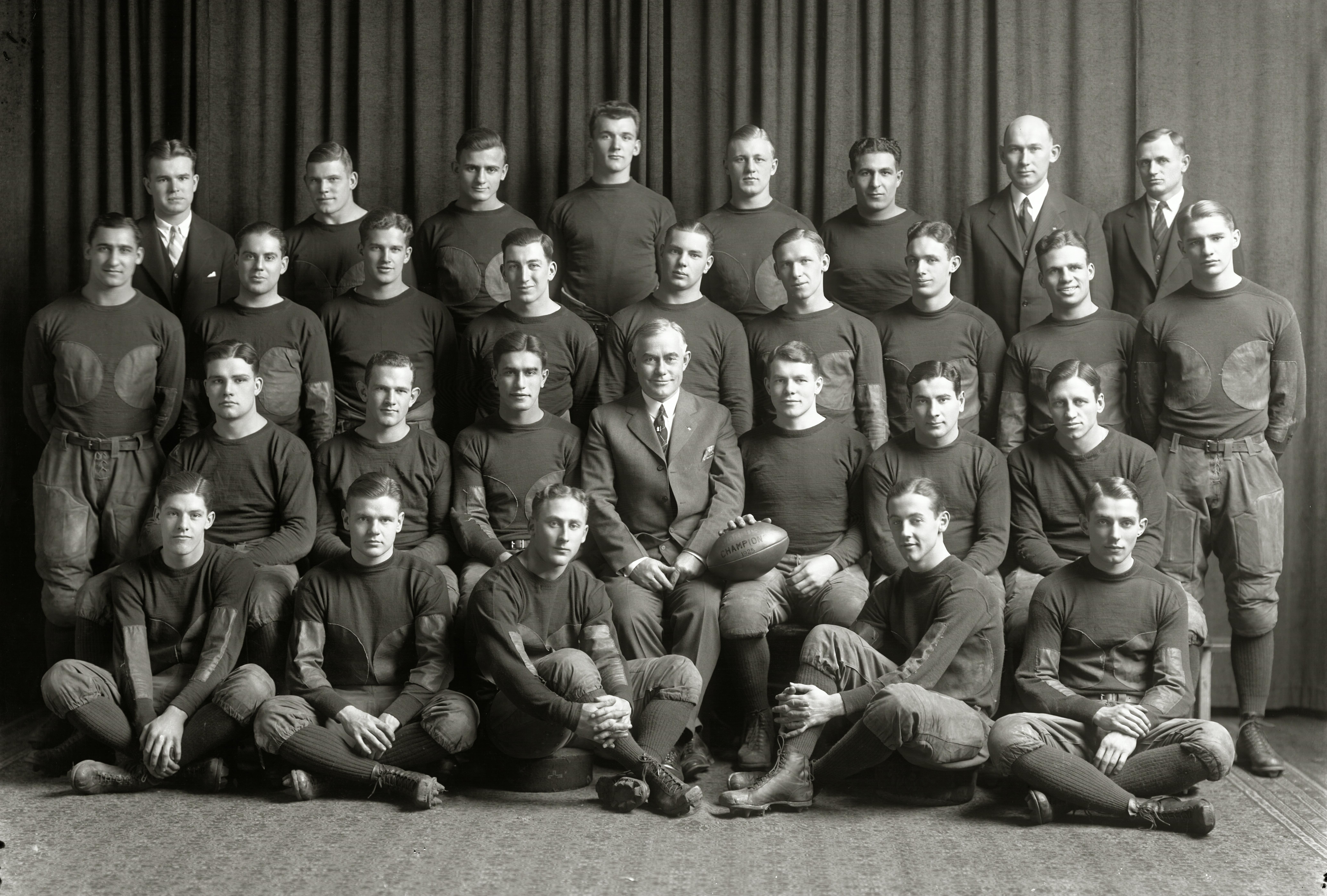

Co-national champion (Sagarin) Big Ten champion
- Conference: Big Ten Conference
- Record: 7–1 (5–1 Big Ten)
- Head coach: Fielding H. Yost (24th season)
- Offensive scheme: Short punt
- Captain: Robert J. Brown
- Home stadium: Ferry Field

Uniform
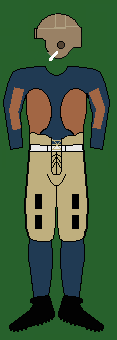

1925 Big Ten Conference football standings
	Conf.					Overall
Team	W		L		T	W		L		T
No. 2 Michigan $	5	–	1	–	0	7	–	1	–	0
Northwestern	3	–	1	–	0	5	–	3	–	0
No. 8 Wisconsin	3	–	1	–	1	6	–	1	–	1
Chicago	2	–	2	–	1	3	–	4	–	1
Illinois	2	–	2	–	0	5	–	3	–	0
Iowa	2	–	2	–	0	5	–	3	–	0
Minnesota	1	–	1	–	1	5	–	2	–	1
Ohio State	1	–	3	–	1	4	–	3	–	1
Indiana	0	–	3	–	1	3	–	4	–	1
Purdue	0	–	3	–	1	3	–	4	–	1
$ – Conference champion; Rankings from Dickinson System

The 1925 Michigan Wolverines football team represented the University of Michigan in the 1925 Big Ten Conference football season. The 1925 season was Fielding H. Yost's 24th as the head football coach. Michigan compiled a 7–1 record and outscored opponents by a combined score of 227 to 3. The 1925 team won the Big Ten Conference championship and was ranked second in country (tied with Alabama) behind Dartmouth in the Dickinson System rankings.

The only points allowed by the team were in a 3 to 2 loss to Northwestern in a game played in a heavy rainstorm on a field covered in mud five or six inches deep in some places. Michigan shut out seven of its eight opponents and allowed only four first downs in the last three games of the season.

Quarterback Benny Friedman and left end Bennie Oosterbaan, sometimes referred to as "The Benny-to-Bennie Show," were both consensus All-Americans and became known as one of the greatest passing combinations in college football history. Friedman finished second in close voting for the 1925 Chicago Tribune Silver Football trophy, which is awarded to the Most Valuable Player in the Big Ten. Both Friedman and Oosterbaan were later inducted into the College Football Hall of Fame. Team captain and center Robert J. Brown and guard Tom Edwards also received first-team All-American honors from some selectors.

At the end of the season, Yost called the 1925 Michigan team "the greatest football team I ever coached" and "the greatest football team I ever saw in action." He continued to maintain that the 1925 squad was his greatest team even years later. The team was retroactively named as a 1925 co-national champion by MIT statistician Jeff Sagarin.

== Schedule ==
Date	Opponent	Site	Result	Attendance
October 3	Michigan State*	Ferry Field; Ann Arbor, MI (rivalry)	W 39–0	30,000
October 10	Indiana	Ferry Field; Ann Arbor, MI	W 63–0	36,000
October 17	at Wisconsin	Camp Randall Stadium; Madison, WI	W 21–0	44,000
October 24	at Illinois	Memorial Stadium; Champaign, IL (rivalry)	W 3–0	67,000
October 31	Navy*	Ferry Field; Ann Arbor, MI	W 54–0	47,000
November 7	at Northwestern	Municipal Grant Park Stadium; Chicago, IL (rivalry)	L 2–3	40,000
November 14	Ohio State	Ferry Field; Ann Arbor, MI (rivalry)	W 10–0	47,000
November 21	Minnesota^{†}	Ferry Field; Ann Arbor, MI (Little Brown Jug)	W 35–0	47,000
*Non-conference game; ^{†}Homecoming

== Preseason ==
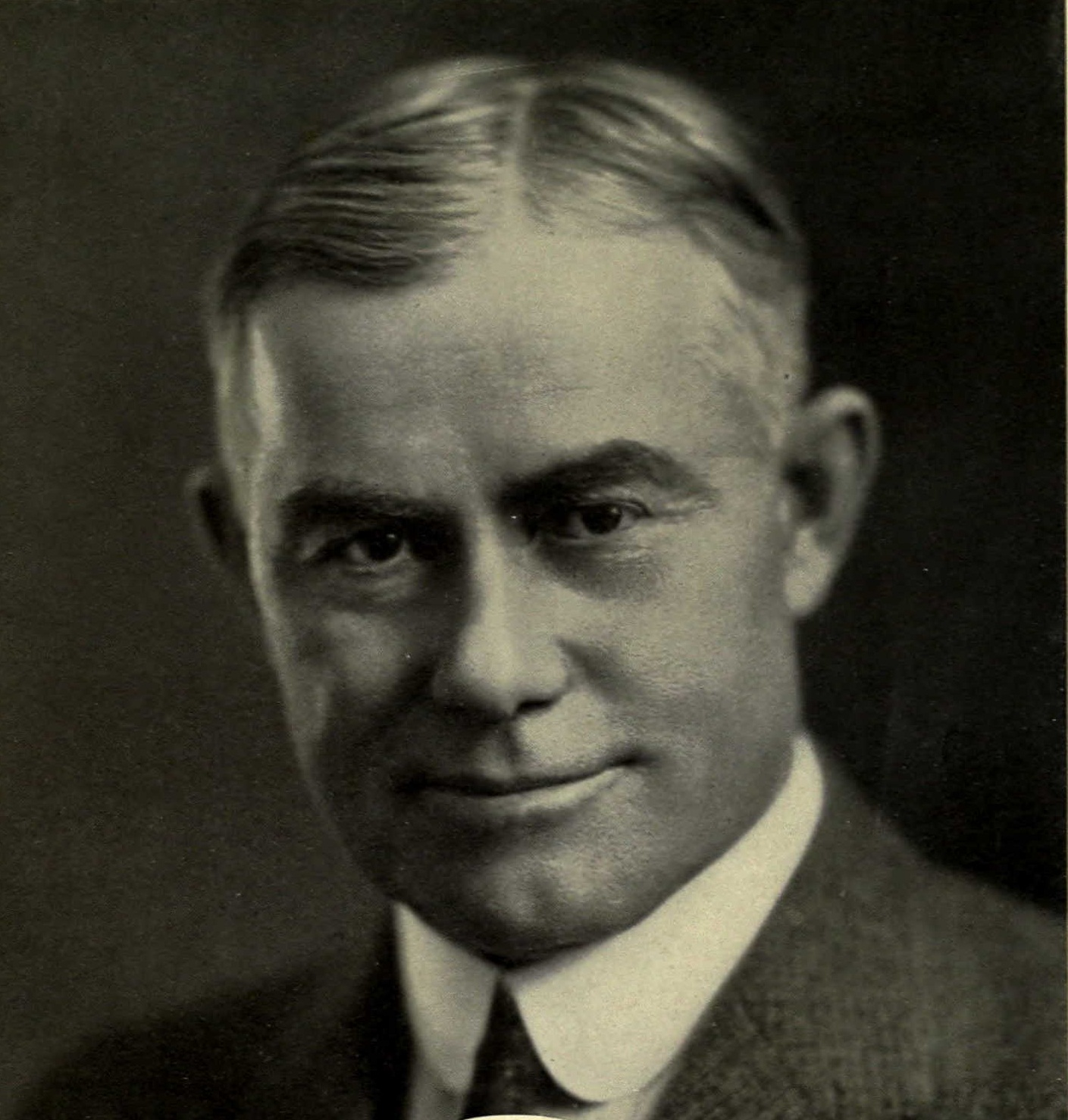
Head coach Fielding H. Yost

The 1924 Michigan Wolverines football team under first-year head coach George Little had compiled a 6–2 record but had suffered an embarrassing 39–14 loss to Illinois and Red Grange. On January 22, 1925, Little announced that he had accepted an offer from the University of Wisconsin to become that school's athletic director and head football coach. At the time, Little expressed his appreciation to Michigan's athletic director Fielding H. Yost, and Yost issued a statement noting, "Michigan's loss is Wisconsin's gain. It will take long thought and careful planning to fill the gap he leaves."

Following Little's resignation, Yost again took over as head coach, as he had for the prior 23 seasons, and Harry Kipke, an All-American for Michigan in the early 1920s, was hired to join Michigan's coaching staff as an assistant. The Chicago Daily Tribune wrote that it was anticipated that Tad Wieman and Kipke may be given principal responsibility for developing the team under Yost's supervision.

Benny Friedman held a grudge against Little for refusing to start him at quarterback during the 1924 season. He later recalled: "I could not play quarterback for Coach Little, because I did not personify what he wanted. Now, under Yost, I was the quarterback, and this game meant much to me."

The 1925 team returned a number of starters from the 1924 team, including 1925 team captain Robert J. Brown, quarterback Benny Friedman, tackle Tom Edwards, guard Harry Hawkins, and right end William Flora.

== Game summaries ==
=== Michigan State ===
Michigan State at Michigan

Team	1	2	3	4	Total
Michigan St	0	0	0	0	0
• Michigan	13	0	26	0	39

- Date: October 3
- Location: Ferry Field • Ann Arbor, MI
- Game attendance: 30,000
- Referee: Horatio B. Hackett

Michigan opened the 1925 season on October 3, with a 39–0 victory over Michigan State College in Ann Arbor. A crowd of 30,000 persons set a Ferry Field record for the first game of a season. The game was the 20th meeting in the Michigan – Michigan State football rivalry. Michigan had won nine straight games, eight by shutouts, dating back to 1916.

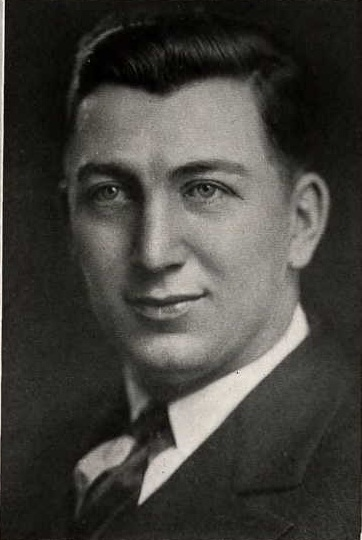
George Babcock (pictured) scored after "scooping up a fumble on the dead run."

Michigan scored twice in the first quarter. The first touchdown came on a 65-yard run by Benny Friedman. (Note: The account of the game in the Chicago Daily Tribune stated that Friedman's touchdown run was for 50 yards.) Later in the quarter, Friedman completed a pass to Charles Grube for a 20-yard gain and then completed another pass to Bruce Gregory for a 30-yard gain and a touchdown. After a scoreless second quarter, Michigan led 13–0 at halftime.

In the third quarter, Michigan scored three touchdowns. The first came on a pass from sophomore halfback Louis Gilbert to fellow sophomore Bennie Oosterbaan for a 40-yard gain and a touchdown. The game marked the first in a Michigan uniform for both Gilbert and Oosterbaan. On the next drive, George Babcock ran 68 yards for a touchdown after "scooping up a fumble on the dead run." (Note: The account of the game in the Chicago Daily Tribune indicates that Babcock's touchdown came on a 40-yard interception return.) Gilbert kicked the extra point, and Michigan led, 27–0. Later in the quarter, Friedman intercepted a pass and then completed a pass to Oosterbaan for a 24-yard gain and a touchdown. The New York Times noted that Oosterbaan "sparkled in his play" and that both of his touchdowns came on "clever catches and smart running." Gilbert kicked two extra points, and Frederic Fuller kicked one.

Michigan's starting lineup was Grube (left end), Hawkins (left tackle), Lovette (left guard), Thisted (center), Edwards (right guard), George Babcock (right tackle), Flora (right end), Friedman (quarterback), Fuller (left halfback), Gregory (right halfback), and Molenda (fullback). Players appearing in the game as substitutes for Michigan included Bennie Oosterbaan (left end), and Louis Gilbert (left halfback). Michigan's team captain and center Robert J. Brown did not appear in the game due to a foot injury.

=== Indiana ===
Indiana at Michigan

Team	1	2	3	4	Total
Indiana	0	0	0	0	0
• Michigan	28	0	14	21	63

- Date: October 10
- Location: Ferry Field • Ann Arbor, MI
- Game attendance: 36,000
- Referee: Walter Eckersall

In the second week of the season, the Wolverines defeated the Indiana Hoosiers, 63–0, at Ferry Field. The game was only the fifth meeting between the two programs and the first since 1903. Michigan had won the four prior games by a combined score of 156 to 0.

Benny Friedman threw five touchdown passes in the game, kicked eight extra points, and had a 55-yard touchdown run. In the Chicago Daily Tribune, Walter Eckersall, who served as the referee in the game, wrote that Friedman was "one of the best all around players in the conference." The Associated Press (AP) wrote that Friedman "sparkled in the smooth-working Michigan offense."

Bruce Gregory scored three touchdowns, and Bennie Oosterbaan scored two. Friedman, Louis Gilbert, William Flora, and Sam Babcock each scored one. Friedman kicked eight extra points, and Carl Stamman kicked one. In its account of the game, AP described Michigan's performance as being "a reincarnation of her famous point-a-minute team of old."

Michigan's starting lineup was Oosterbaan (left end), Tom Edwards (left tackle), John Lovette (left guard), Robert J. Brown (center), Harry Hawkins (right guard), James Oade (right tackle), William Flora (right end), Friedman (quarterback), Gilbert (left halfback), Gregory (right halfback), and Bo Molenda (fullback). Substitutes appearing in the game for Michigan included Sam Babcock (left halfback) and Carl Stamman (fullback).

=== Wisconsin ===
Michigan at Wisconsin

Team	1	2	3	4	Total
• Michigan	14	7	0	0	21
Wisconsin	0	0	0	0	0

- Date: October 17
- Location: Camp Randall Stadium • Madison, WI
- Game attendance: 44,000
- Referee: J. Masker (Northwestern)

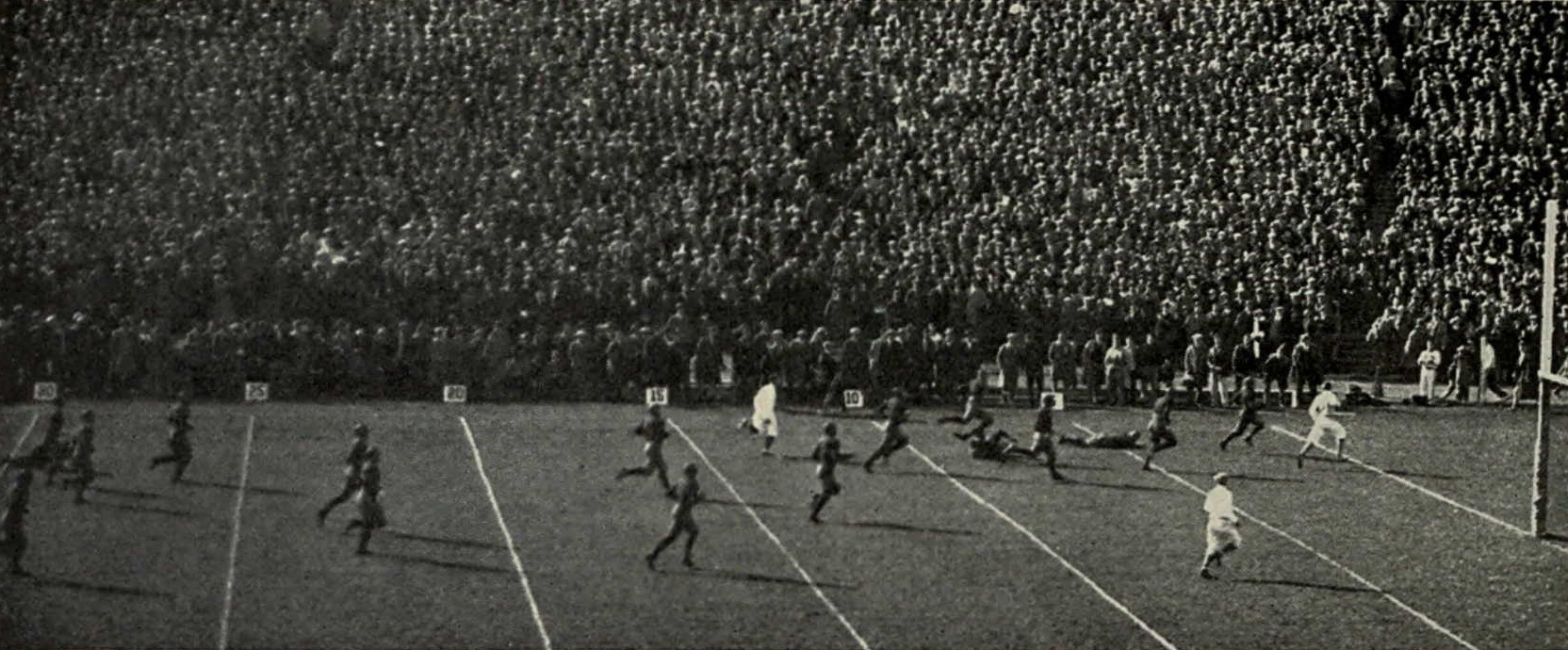
Benny Friedman's 85-yard kickoff return against Wisconsin.

In the third week of the season, Michigan defeated Wisconsin, 21–0, at Madison, Wisconsin. In eight prior games between Wisconsin and Michigan teams coached by Yost, Michigan was undefeated. George Little was in his first year as Wisconsin's head coach after having been an assistant to Yost in 1922 and 1923 and Michigan's head coach in 1924. The game attracted a capacity crowd of 44,000 to Camp Randall Stadium.

On the first play from scrimmage, Friedman faked a pass to Bennie Oosterbaan who was sprinting downfield and threw a pass to Bruce Gregory for a 62-yard gain and a touchdown. Following the touchdown, Wisconsin kicked off, and Friedman returned the kickoff 85 yards for a touchdown. Friedman converted both extra points, and Michigan led, 14–0, after the first three plays. The AP noted: "It took just thirty-one seconds for Michigan to win the game at Madison and show the football world that Benny Friedman is destined for top rank among the great players developed by Yost."

In the second quarter, Tom Edwards intercepted a pass deep in Michigan territory. After the interception, Friedman completed a pass to Bennie Oosterbaan for the final score of the game. In its account of the game, the AP wrote that Michigan's line outplayed Wisconsin with "Edwards especially wrecking Wisconsin's attempts at a running game."

Michigan's starting lineup was Oosterbaan (left end), Hawkins (left tackle), Lovette (left guard), Brown (center), Edwards (right guard), George Babcock (right tackle), Flora (right end), Friedman (quarterback), Gilbert (left halfback), Gregory (right halfback), and Molenda (fullback).

=== Illinois ===
Michigan at Illinois

Team	1	2	3	4	Total
• Michigan	0	3	0	0	3
Illinois	0	0	0	0	0

- Date: October 24
- Location: Memorial Stadium • Champaign, IL
- Game attendance: 67,000
- Referee: Walter Eckersall

On October 24, Michigan won its fourth consecutive shutout with a 3–0 victory over Illinois at Champaign, Illinois. The victory came as Illinois celebrated homecoming in front of a record crowd of 67,000 at Memorial Stadium. In 1924, Illinois had defeated Michigan, 39–14, as Red Grange scored four touchdowns in the span of ten minutes. Stopping Grange was considered to be the key to beating Illinois in 1925. During the pre-season practice sessions, Michigan's line coach Tad Wieman dressed a player in a sweater with Grange's number (77) and sent his guards and tackles "after the mythical Grange with instructions to 'hit him hard.'" Before the game, Michigan coach Yost told reporters: "One of the greatest throngs in all football history is here. For weeks the game has been on every tongue. . . . Our players have been compared as to weight, speed, and ability. The stage is set."

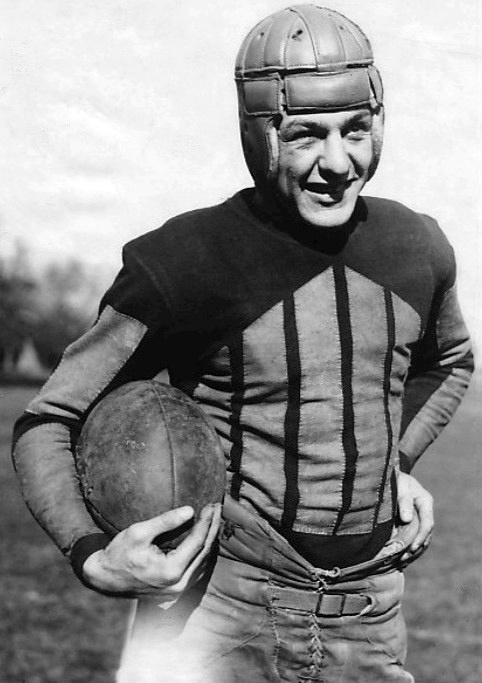
Red Grange (pictured)

The only points of the game were scored in the second quarter on a Benny Friedman field goal from the 25-yard line. The field goal was set up by a Bennie Oosterbaan interception and a long gain on a triple pass from Friedman to George Babcock who then handed the ball to Bruce Gregory. Earl Britton of Illinois attempted two field goals, but both missed the mark. The game was played on a rainsoaked field which was credited with handicapping Grange.

Michigan fullback Bo Molenda was also credited with stopping Grange. Grange played at quarterback for the first time in his career and was held to 56 net rushing yards on 25 carries. The AP wrote of Molenda's efforts: "Molenda was the principal reason why the Illini's aerial attack was unsuccessful. Time after time he got in the way to make the pass incomplete or to gather it in his arms." Molenda intercepted a pass thrown by Grange on the opening drive of the game and made a second interception of a pass thrown by Earl Britton later in the first quarter. He had two more interceptions in the fourth quarter, both on passes thrown by Daugherty. Multiple sources indicate that Molenda intercepted a total of five passes in the game.

In an increasingly rare display of ironman football, the same 22 players who started the game for Michigan and Illinois also finished the game. The AP noted: "The fact that the same men finished the game is causing wide comment, for such a happening has not occurred in Big Ten contests for a great many years. This seems to be the age of wholesale substitutions, and to have two elevens go through an important and hard contest without rushing in new men every few minutes is to upset modern football precedent."

Michigan's starting lineup was Oosterbaan (left end), George Babcock (left tackle), Lovette (left guard), Brown (center), Dewey (right guard), Hawkins (right tackle), Flora (right end), Friedman (quarterback), Gilbert (left halfback), Gregory (right halfback), and Molenda (fullback).

=== Navy ===
Navy at Michigan

Team	1	2	3	4	Total
Navy	0	0	0	0	0
• Michigan	21	0	14	19	54

- Date: October 31
- Location: Ferry Field • Ann Arbor, MI
- Game attendance: 47,000
- Referee: Dave Fultz

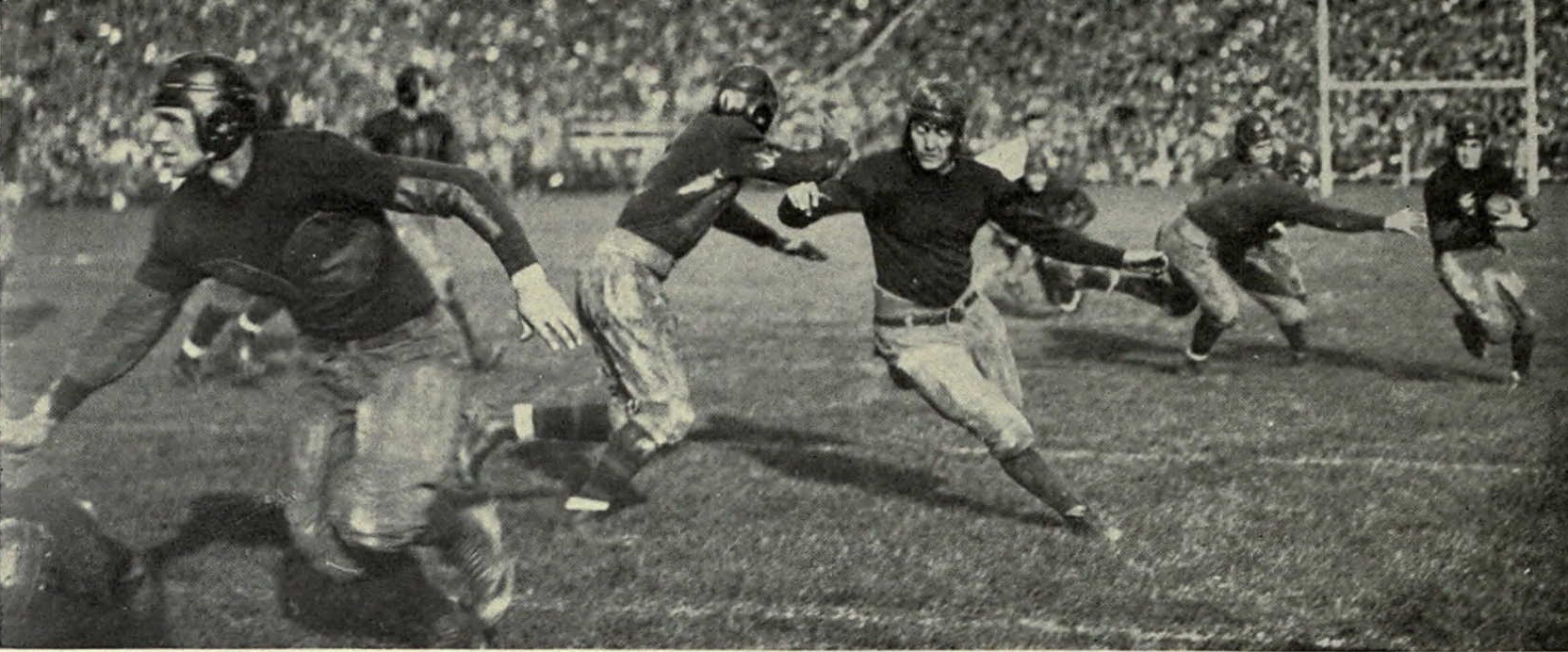
Michigan running play vs. Navy: Bruce Gregory in center of frame; Bo Molenda at far left.

Michigan secured its fifth consecutive shutout with a 54–0 victory over Navy at Ferry Field on October 31. The game was the first meeting between the two traditional football powers. The 1925 Navy team came into the game undefeated, averaging almost 23 points a game, and featuring two players (Tom Hamilton and Frank Wickhorst) who were later inducted into the College Football Hall of Fame. The defeat was the worst suffered by a Navy football team up to that time.

On Michigan's second play from scrimmage, quarterback Benny Friedman completed a pass to Bruce Gregory for a 20-yard gain, and Bo Molenda then ran 18 yards for a touchdown. Michigan scored its second touchdown when William Flora blocked a punt and recovered the ball in the end zone. According to one account, Flora broke through the line so quickly that he was able to snatch the ball as it dropped from the punter's hand to his foot. On the next scoring drive, Friedman passed to Sammy Babcock and then threw an 18-yard touchdown pass to Molenda. Michigan led 21–0 at the end of the first quarter. (Note: The game account published by the Chicago Daily Tribune credited Molenda with the third touchdown. The AP account, and accounts in other papers, credited Molenda with the same touchdown.)

In the third quarter, Friedman passed 22 yards to Oosterbaan for the fourth touchdown. On the next drive, Friedman completed two passes to Oosterbaan, with Oosterbaan running out of bounds at the Navy one-foot line after the second pass. Molenda ran for the touchdown from there. In the fourth quarter, Michigan played its second-string backfield. William Herrnstein returned a punt 50 yard and then scored on a run from the 11-yard line. James Miller intercepted a pass and returned it 35 yards for a touchdown. And Leo Hoffman ran for a final touchdown just before the game ended. Friedman kicked five extra points in the game, and Miller added one.

Writing in The New York Times, Richards Vidmer opened his account of the game as follows: "The greatest naval disaster of them all took place on Ferry Field today when a hungry pack of Wolverines set upon the Navy eleven from Annapolis, snarled and snapped, chewed and clawed, and finally buried the Easterners under a defeat of 54 to 0. It probably was the worst defeat the Navy ever has suffered on land or sea." Vidmer added that the Michigan squad played "like one big monster" and opined that the team would probably go down in history as Fielding Yost's masterpiece. Writing in the Chicago Daily Tribune, James Crusinberry also employed a naval metaphor: "Under a maze of forward pass plays, double passes, delayed passes, and criss-cross, Uncle Sam's proud gridiron dreadnaught, rocked by a great Michigan tidal wave, limped into port tonight on the leeward side of a 54 to 0 score." Crusinberry opined that Michigan had "played more new football . . . than any team ever did in one game" and declared quarterback Benny Friedman the star of the game:

"If any one man stood out, it was Benny Friedman, who hurled forward passes with accuracy and abandon time after time. . . . Besides that, Benny was a regular whirligig in carrying the ball. And it was Benny who was the field general. His selections of plays was something that would make any general envious."

Two day after the game, Crusinberry wrote a column in the Chicago Daily Tribune opining that Michigan's offense was the culmination of the new, less brutish game of football:

"The old time player, who did his stuff by brute strength, has given way to the modern man with a head full of tricks. . . . And now we have Mr. Yost's new Michigan team, with not a Grange on it, but with one of the brainiest players of the age in Benny Friedman and a lot of smart fellows to work with him. Before Benny Friedman ends his career all the teams of the country, even the Navy, will have abandoned the old style football and will be using, or at least trying to use, smart and unexpected stuff. It gains ground, it is spectacular, and it wins."

Michigan's starting lineup was Oosterbaan (left end), George Babcock (left tackle), Lovette (left guard), Brown (center), Dewey (right guard), Hawkins (right tackle), Flora (right end), Friedman (quarterback), Gilbert (left halfback), Gregory (right halfback), and Molenda (fullback). Players appearing in the game as substitutes for Michigan were Norman Gabel (left tackle), Carl Thisted (center), Ray Baer (right guard), James Oade (right tackle), Charles Grube (right end), Bill Puckelwartz (quarterback), Frederic Fuller and Leo Hoffman (left halfback), Sam Babcock, James Miller, and William Herrnstein (right halfback), Carl Stamman and Wally Weber (fullback).

=== Northwestern ===
Michigan at Northwestern

Team	1	2	3	4	Total
Michigan	0	0	2	0	2
• Northwestern	3	0	0	0	3

- Date: November 7
- Location: Municipal Grant Park Stadium • Chicago, IL
- Game attendance: 40,000
- Referee: Walter Eckersall

Michigan suffered its lone setback of the 1925 season with a 3–2 loss to Northwestern at Municipal Grant Park Stadium in Chicago. Michigan played the game without its All-American tackle Tom Edwards, who was recovering from an arm injury.

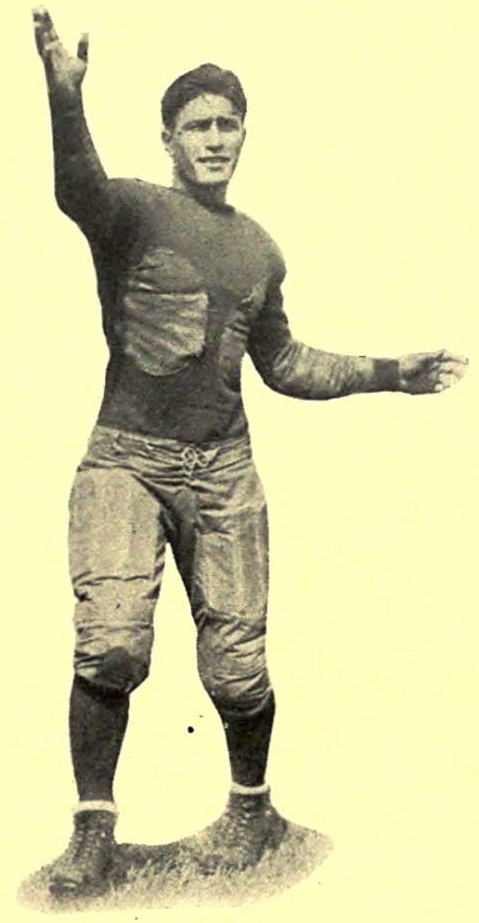
Benny Friedman (pictured) had his passing attack hampered by the weather.

Although the official paid attendance was recorded as 40,000, newspaper accounts reported that only 20,000 actually attended, as the game was played in a heavy rainstorm on a cold afternoon. The rain turned the field into a "sea of mud" with an inch of standing water on top of the mud. In the Chicago Daily Tribune, Walter Eckersall (who also served as the game's referee) compared the field to a "bog" and added:

"In my twenty-five years of football I have never seen worse conditions. Pools of water stood on parts of the field and in some places the players' feet sunk into the field five or six inches. It rained throughout the game and a strong wind from the north gave the team defending that goal a decided advantage."

The conditions on the field were so poor that the schools' marching bands declined the usual halftime parade across the field and instead played from the cinder path around the field.

The poor playing conditions resulted in frequent fumbles by both teams and prevented either team from converting a single first down. Only one pass was attempted in the game, an incomplete pass by Friedman. Northwestern's three points were the only ones allowed by Michigan during the 1925 season. Michigan kicked off to Northwestern to open the game. Seeking to take advantage of the weather conditions, Leland "Tiny" Lewis of Northwestern punted on the first play from scrimmage. Benny Friedman tried to scoop up the ball, but he fumbled it and Northwestern recovered on Michigan's three-yard line. Michigan's defense held on three straight runs by Northwestern. On fourth down, Lewis kicked a field goal from the 18-yard line with the ball having "barely enough power" to go over the crossbar.

Michigan's defense played a strong game, and its line was described as "a veritable stone wall." Throughout the game, both teams played a kicking game, punting on second or third down and hoping for a break. Walter Eckersall described the pattern of the game as follows:

Each team would make two attempts to gain. The referee would then charge time out to himself so the centers could wipe off the ball before punting. The ball would be kicked, permitted to hit the ground, and be declared dead by the referee. This was the procedure throughout practically the entire game."

In the third quarter, Michigan had the wind at its back and had field position in its favor. On one drive, the Wolverines pushed the Wildcats' offense back to their own one-yard line. On fourth down, Northwestern faced the prospect of punting into the wind from its own end zone and giving Michigan its best scoring opportunity. Rather than punting, Northwestern captain Tim Lowry directed Lewis to down the ball behind the goal line, giving Michigan two points on the safety. Under the rules in effect at the time, Northwestern received possession of the ball at their 30-yard line after taking the safety. Walter Eckersall called Lowry's decision to take the safety "a smart piece of strategy" and "the deciding factor in an otherwise featureless game." Others described Lowry's call "a brilliant bit of generalship" and "a great exhibition of football brains." (The rule allowing the team giving up a safety to retake possession was changed the following year.)

Coach Yost expressed his thorough disgust with the condition of the field and said he may start a movement to postpone games under similar conditions. The Chicago Daily Tribune quipped that, after losing "in one of the best swimming matches Michigan has ever entered," it was a safe bet that Yost would "never again permit a Michigan football team to play a game on Soldiers' Field."

Michigan's starting lineup was Oosterbaan (left end), Gabel (left tackle), Lovette (left guard), Brown (center), George Babcock (right guard), Hawkins (right tackle), Flora (right end), Friedman (quarterback), Herrnstein (left halfback), Gregory (right halfback), and Molenda (fullback).

=== Ohio State ===
Ohio State at Michigan

Team	1	2	3	4	Total
Ohio State	0	0	0	0	0
• Michigan	7	3	0	0	10

- Date: November 14
- Location: Ferry Field • Ann Arbor, MI
- Game attendance: 47,000
- Referee: Maskers (Northwestern)

In the seventh game of the season, Michigan defeated Ohio State, 10–0, in front of a capacity crowd at Ferry Field. Michigan opened the game focused on the passing game with Benny Friedman throwing 10 passes in the first eight minutes of the game. In the entire game, Friedman completed seven of 26 passes for 71 passing yards. In the Chicago Daily Tribune, Irving Vaughan wrote that, with a dry field, "the Wolverines turned loose a veritable broadside of passes during the sixty minutes of combat, but it was grueling, old fashioned football that won the game."

The only touchdown of the game followed a blocked punt in the first quarter. William Flora of Michigan blocked a punt by "Windy" Wendler. Ohio State fell on the ball at their own one-yard line, but the ball went to Michigan on downs. From the one-yard line, Friedman twice handed off to left tackle Tom Edwards for no gain or a gain of a foot. Bo Molenda was stopped on third down, but carried the ball across the goal line on fourth down. Friedman kicked the extra point to give Michigan a 7–0 lead.

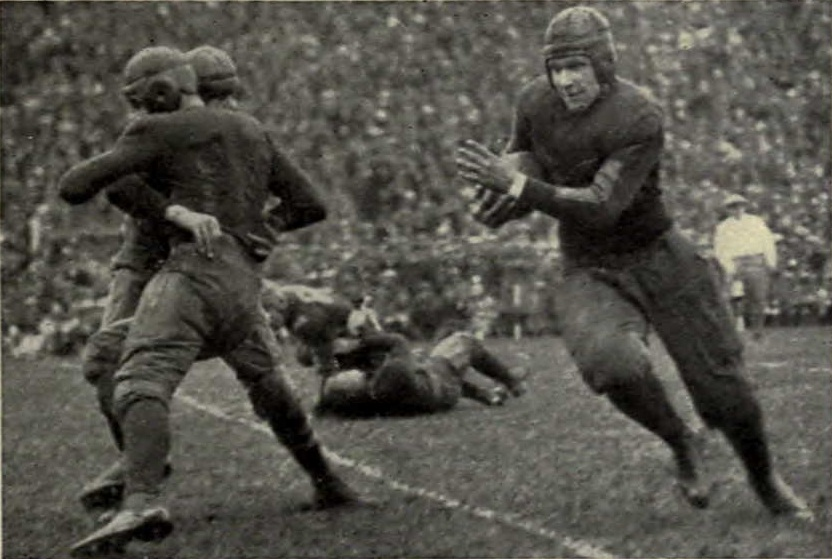
Bennie Oosterbaan (left) blocking for Bo Molenda (with ball).

In the second quarter, Bennie Oosterbaan intercepted a pass at Ohio State's 18-yard line, but a fumble resulted in a loss of 15 yards. Friedman kicked a field goal "at a hazardous angle" from the 40-yard line.

Michigan's starting lineup was Oosterbaan (left end), Edwards (left tackle), Lovette (left guard), Brown (center), Baer (right guard), Hawkins (right tackle), Flora (right end), Friedman (quarterback), Gilbert (left halfback), Gregory (right halfback), and Molenda (fullback). Players appearing in the game as substitutes for Michigan were Charles Grube, George Babcock, Sam Babcock, William Herrnstein, and Carl Stamman.

=== Minnesota ===
Minnesota at Michigan

Team	1	2	3	4	Total
Minnesota	0	0	0	0	0
• Michigan	7	7	7	14	35

- Date: November 21
- Location: Ferry Field • Ann Arbor, MI
- Game attendance: 47,000
- Referee: Nichols (Oberlin)

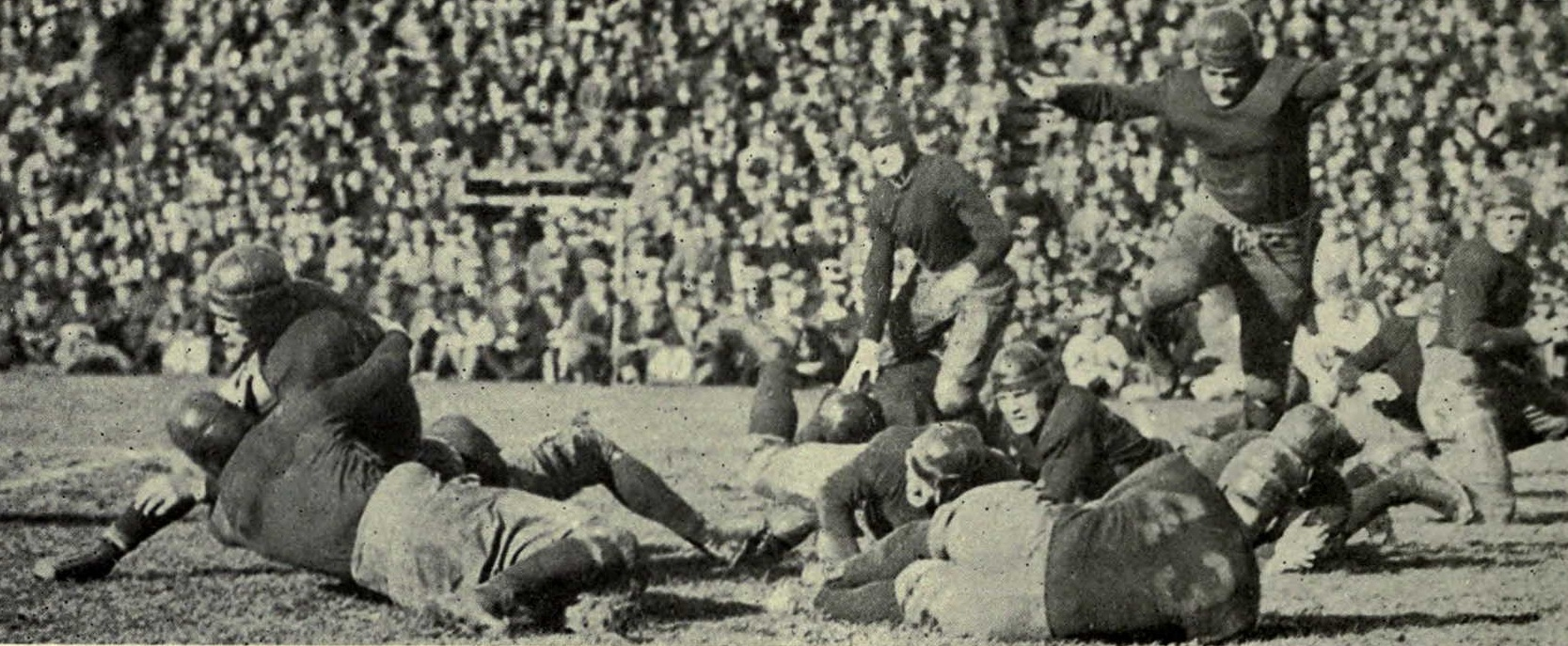
Benny Friedman on ground at left after being tackled with the ball against Minnesota.

Michigan concluded its 1925 season with a 35–0 victory over Minnesota for the Wolverines' seventh shutout in eight games. The game was played at Ferry Field before a sellout, homecoming crowd of 47,000 on a warm Indian summer afternoon. Minnesota came into the game with a 5–1–1 record and a highly touted offense featuring Herb Joesting that was averaging 25 points per game. More than 3,000 Minnesotans and the 100-piece Minnesota band traveled to Ann Arbor on five special trains.

The AP wrote that Michigan won the game with "a driving line attack and a bewildering aerial game." Michigan's first touchdown drive was led by Benny Friedman's passing. He completed a pass to sophomore Bennie Oosterbaan for a 23-yard gain and followed with a pass to William Flora for an 11-yard gain. Fullback Bo Molenda then ran 24 yards for the touchdown, and Friedman kicked the extra point.

Michigan's second touchdown drive started with a 25-yard gain on a pass from Friedman to Oosterbaan. Sophomore halfback Louis Gilbert then ran 20 yards, and Molenda ran for the touchdown from the one-yard line. Friedman kicked the extra point, and Michigan led, 14–0, at halftime.

In the third quarter, Friedman threw a touchdown pass to Oosterbaan, and Friedman kicked his third extra point. In the fourth quarter, Minnesota opened up its passing game in an attempt to overcome Michigan's 21–0 lead. Halfway through the quarter, Louis Gilbert intercepted a pass and returned it 60 yards down the right side for a touchdown. In addition to the interception return, Gilbert also returned a punt 35 yards in the second quarter, handled the punting for Michigan, and was credited by the Chicago Daily Tribune with "sensational open field running."

Michigan's final touchdown was set up by another turnover, as Carl Stamman intercepted a pass and returned it 35 yards to the Minnesota nine-yard line. Friedman threw a pass to Oosterbaan for the touchdown. Benny Friedman completed seven of 16 pass attempts for 130 yards and converted all five extra point kicks to give Michigan a 35–0 victory.

On defense, Michigan did not allow Minnesota to complete a pass and held the Gophers to four first downs, two in each half, and 45 net rushing yards. Minnesota ran an offense featuring the "Spear shift," named for the team's head coach Clarence Spears. The shift failed to gain against Michigan's line, leading the Chicago Daily Tribune to write:

"The famous Minnesota shift was a bloomer. The Gophers shifted and shifted and kept on shifting like a lot of hop toads and every time they shifted, the Michigan line shifted with them and knocked them flat as soon as the ball was snapped. To the Michigan team that shift was about as puzzling as a dog's bark."

Michigan's starting lineup was Oosterbaan (left end), Tom Edwards (left tackle), Ray Baer (left guard), Robert J. Brown (center), John Lovette (right guard), Harry Hawkins (right tackle), Flora (right end), Friedman (quarterback), Gilbert (left halfback), Wally Weber (right halfback), and Molenda (fullback). Players appearing in the game as substitutes for Michigan were George Babcock (left tackle), Norman Gabel (left guard), Syd Dewey (right guard), Charles Grube (right end), James Miller and Frederic Fuller (left halfback), Bruce Gregory (right halfback), and Carl Stamman (fullback).

== Post-season ==
=== Controversy over Big Ten Championship ===
At the end of the season, Michigan and Northwestern each had one loss to conference opponents. However, Northwestern also lost two non-conference games. When it was reported that Coach Yost had given gold footballs emblematic of championship to members of his team, a riot broke out involving 1,200 Northwestern students in Evanston, Illinois. An abandoned fraternity house was set on fire, and firemen who tried to extinguish the fire were thrown aside and their fire hoses were cut. A large bonfire was also built in the middle of Fountain Square. When the mayor of Evanston tried to calm the crowd, he was slugged, and the automobile of the police chief was overturned and damaged. One police officer was disarmed and "so badly mauled that two ribs were broken." Evanston police fired "tear bombs" into the crowd, and the mayor threatened to order police to "shoot and shoot to kill" if such a disorder was repeated.

On the day after the riot, Northwestern's head coach and team captain sent a telegram to University of Michigan president C. C. Little disavowing any claim by Northwestern to the Big Ten football championship. They wrote: "In view of the remarkable showing that has been made by the 1925 football team of the University of Michigan, we believe that the University of Michigan is entitled to sole and undivided honors in the conference, and we wish you to know that Northwestern makes no claim for any share in them, but regards it as a privilege to be even for a few minutes placed in a class with the University of Michigan's team." Following the announcement, Evanston police continued to guard Northwestern's football field to prevent the burning of the wooden stands. The forces dispatched to the stands included a car mounted with a machine gun.

=== Individual honors ===
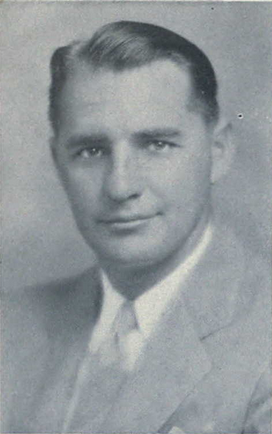
Bennie Oosterbaan

At the close of the 1925 season, football writers were divided over whether Benny Friedman or Northwestern's Tim Lowry should receive the Chicago Tribune Silver Football as the Most Valuable Player in the Big Ten Conference. Lowry won the award with 23 points to 18 for Friedman. The "Meyer Morton Award" went to Ray Baer.

Friedman and Bennie Oosterbaan were both selected as consensus first-team All-Americans. Oosterbaan received the most first-team honors, including first-team selections by the United Press, Associated Press, Collier's Weekly, Athlete & Sportsman magazine, the All-America Board, and Knute Rockne. The passing combination of Friedman and Oosterbaan, which became known as "The Benny-To-Bennie Show," is considered "one of the greatest passing combinations in college football history." Both players were later inducted into the College Football Hall of Fame for their contributions as players at Michigan.

Michigan team captain and center Robert J. Brown was selected as a first-team All-American by Athlete & Sportsman magazine (selections made based on the votes of 228 leading football coaches), Billy Evans, Norman E. Brown, and Sam Willaman.

Walter Eckersall called the 1925 Michigan team "by far the best team in the conference" and selected three Wolverines as first-team selections on his All-Big Ten team. They were Friedman, Bennie Oosterbaan, and Tom Edwards. Eckersall also selected Robert J. Brown, Harry Hawkins, and William Flora for second-team All-Big Ten honors and included Bo Molenda and John Lovette as third-team honorees. On December 20, 1925, Eckersall announced his All-American selections. He picked Oosterbaan and Edwards as first-team All-Americans.

=== Team honors and legacy ===
In national rankings for the 1925 season, Michigan was tied with Alabama for second place behind Dartmouth under the Dickinson System, a rating model developed by Frank G. Dickinson, an economics professor at the University of Illinois.

Despite coaching six national championship teams at Michigan, Fielding H. Yost regarded the 1925 Michigan squad as the greatest team he ever coached. At the annual awards dinner in 1925, Yost told the players, "You are members of the greatest football team I ever coached; in fact you are the greatest football team I ever saw in action. I am making this statement cognizant of the wonderful record of the 1901 team and the Point-A-Minute teams that followed." Yost noted that Michigan had allowed only four first downs in the last three games of the season and added, "This is the most remarkable defensive record ever made in football."

In 1931, Yost told Grantland Rice that he still considered the 1925 team to be better than his "Point-a-Minute" from the early 1900s:

"I still think the best team I ever coached was the 1925 bunch. They had everything. Those early teams had speed and power. But the game was simpler then. That 1925 bunch, which included Friedman and Oosterbaan, could run an end, buck a line, throw passes, kick, block, tackle, think, and do about everything needed on a football field to gain ground and keep other people from gaining ground. Don't forget about that 1925 team that our opponents had a hard time making first downs, much less winning the game."

Even years later, at the time of his 66th birthday in 1937, Yost continued to wear a watch charm identifying the 1925 team as a championship eleven and continued to maintain that the 1925 team was his greatest eleven.

== Personnel ==
=== Depth chart ===
The following chart provides a visual depiction of Michigan's lineup during the 1925 season with games started at the position reflected in parentheses. The chart mimics Yost's short punt formation while on offense, with the quarterback under center.

LE
Bennie Oosterbaan (7)
Charles Grube (1)

LT	LG	C	RG	RT
Dick Babcock (3)	John H. Lovette (6)	Robert J. Brown (7)	Tom Edwards (3)	Harry Hawkins (5)
Harry Hawkins (3)	Ray Baer (1)	Carl E. Thisted (1)	Syd Dewey (2)	Dick Babcock (2)
Tom Edwards (2)	Norman Gabel (1)		John Lovette (2)	James Oade (1)
			Ray Baer (1)	

RE
William R. Flora (8)
Charles Grube (0)

QB
Benny Friedman (8)
Bill Puckelwartz (0)

LHB	RHB
Louis Gilbert (6)	Bruce Gregory (5)
Frederic W. Fuller (1)	Louis Gilbert (1)
Bruce Gregory (1)	William Herrnstein (1)
Sam Babcock (0)	Wally Weber (1)
Leo Hoffman (0)	James Miller Jr. (0)

FB
Bo Molenda (8)
Carl Stamman (0)

=== Varsity letter winners ===
Number	Player	Position	Games started	Hometown	Prep school	Height	Weight	Age
	R. George "Dick" Babcock	Tackle	5	Royal Oak, Michigan				
	Sam Babcock	Halfback	0					
	Ray Baer	Guard	2	Louisville, Kentucky				
	Robert J. Brown	Center	7	Ypsilanti, Michigan				
	Richard Sidney "Syd" Dewey	Guard	2	Monroe, Michigan				
	Tom Edwards	Guard, tackle	5	Central Lake, Michigan				
	William R. Flora	End	8	Muskegon, Michigan				
27	Benny Friedman	Quarterback	8	Cleveland, Ohio		5'8"	172	20
	Frederic W. Fuller	Halfback	1	Grand Rapids, Michigan				
	Norman Gabel	Tackle	1	Detroit, Michigan				
	Louis Gilbert	Halfback	7	Kalamazoo, Michigan				
	Bruce Gregory	Halfback	8	Ann Arbor, Michigan				
	Charles Grube	End	1	Saginaw, Michigan	Arthur Hill H.S.			
	Harry Hawkins	Guard, tackle	8	Saginaw, Michigan	Arthur Hill H.S.			
	William H. Herrnstein Jr.	Halfback	1	Chillicothe, Ohio				
	John H. Lovette	Guard	8	Saginaw, Michigan				
	James F. Miller Jr.	Halfback	0					
	John Molenda	Fullback	8	Detroit, Michigan				
	James Oade	Guard	1	Lansing, Michigan				
47	Bennie Oosterbaan	End	7	Muskegon, Michigan		6'0"	180	19
	H. Frederick Parker	Halfback	0					
	William "Bill" Puckelwartz	Quarterback	0	Escanaba, Michigan				20 (Note: William H. Puckelwartz, born February 4, 1905, died February 1976.)
	Carl Stamman	Fullback	0					
	Carl E. Thisted	Center	1	Great Falls, Montana				
	Wally Weber	Halfback	1	Mt. Clemens, Michigan				

=== aMa letter winners ===
Player	Position	Hometown	Prep school	Height	Weight	Age
Victor E. Domhoff		Toledo, Ohio				20 (Note: Victor Ernsthausen Domhoff, born c. 1905, died December 21, 1947.)
Martin Garber
Henry S. Grinnell
LeRoy Heston	Halfback	Grant's Pass, Oregon				22
Leo W. Hoffman
Kent C. McIntyre
Maxwell Nickerson
John M. Palmeroli
John B. Schoenfeld
Stanley Skidmore (Note: Stanley Lavern Skidmore, died December 5, 1989.)		Battle Creek, Michigan				
Dominic Sullo
Howard A. Webber

=== Scoring leaders ===
Player	Touchdowns	Extra points	Field goals	Safeties	Points
Bennie Oosterbaan	8	0	0	0	48
Benny Friedman	3	22	2	0	46
Bo Molenda	6	0	0	0	36
Bruce Gregory	5	0	0	0	30
Louis Gilbert	3	2	0	0	20
William Flora	2	0	0	0	12
James Miller	1	1	0	0	7
George Babcock	1	0	0	0	6
Sam Babcock	1	0	0	0	6
William Herrnstein	1	0	0	0	6
Leo Hoffman	1	0	0	0	6
Frederic Fuller	0	1	0	0	1
Carl Stamman	0	1	0	0	1
na	0	0	0	1	2
Total	32	27	2	1	227

=== Coaching staff ===
- Coach: Fielding H. Yost
- Assistant coaches: Tad Wieman, Jack Blott, Harry Kipke, Franklin Cappon, Ray Fisher, Edwin Mather
- Trainer: Charles B. Hoyt
- Manager: J. Glen Donaldson, Roswell Burrows (assistant), Carlos D. Kelly (assistant), James K. Boyer (assistant), John S. Denton (assistant)
