= Ed Hess =

American football player (1905–1963)

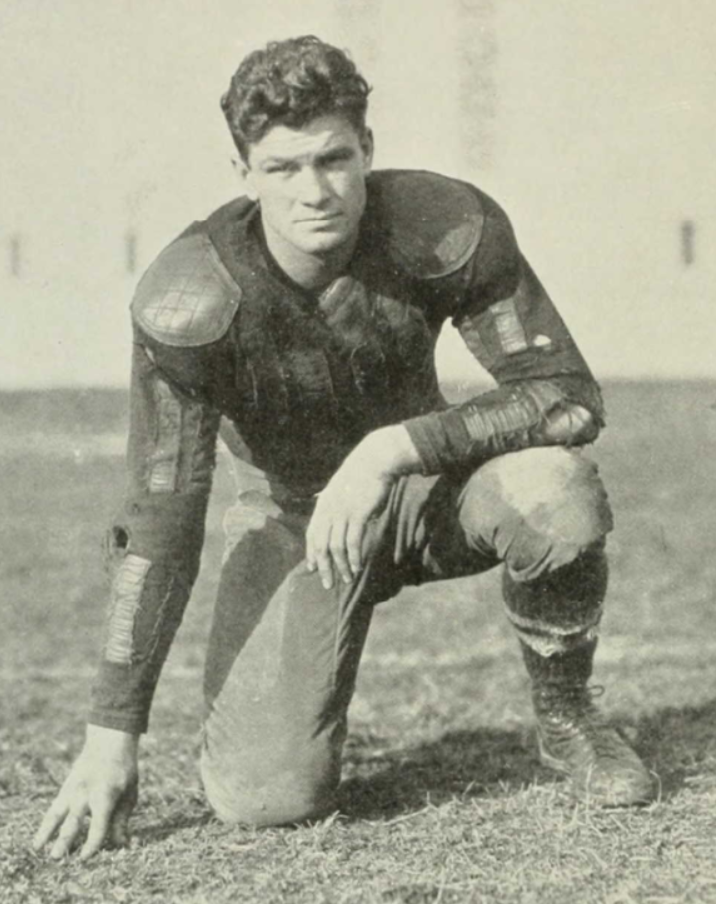
- Hess from the 1926 "Makio"

Ohio State Buckeyes
- Position: Guard

Personal information
- Born: June 29, 1905; Cleveland, Ohio, U.S.
- Died: May 20, 1963 (aged 57); Clarendon Hill, Illinois, U.S.

Career information
- College: Ohio State (1924–1926)

Awards and highlights
- Consensus All-American (1925); First-team All-American (1926); 2x All-Big Ten (1925-1926)

Edwin Albion Hess, Sr. (c. 1905 – 1963) was an American football player. He played at the guard position for the Ohio State Buckeyes football team from 1924 to 1926 and was a consensus first-team All-American in 1925. Hess is the great, great uncle of guitarist Tom Hess.

Hess was the son of William Buchanan Hess and Florence Camille Beale and was raised in Chardon, Ohio. He enrolled at Ohio State University in 1923 and joined the football team as a sophomore in 1924. He reportedly "did not flash until the closing games of the 1924 season."

As a junior in 1925, Hess reportedly played well throughout the season and "rose to the height of his colorful playing" in the Columbia and Illinois games. The 1925 Ohio State Buckeyes football team finished the season with a disappointing 4-3-1 (1-3-1 Big Ten) record, including losses to Michigan and Illinois to end the years. Nevertheless, Hess was a consensus first-team selection on the 1925 College Football All-America Team. He received first-team honors in 1925 from the United Press, Collier's Weekly (as selected by Grantland Rice), and Athlete and Sportsman magazine, and second-team honors from the Associated Press, the All-America Board, and Walter Eckersall, football critic of the Chicago Tribune. Hess also won the Walter Camp Memorial Trophy in 1925.

As a senior in 1926, Hess did not repeat as a consensus All-American. The 1926 Buckeyes improved to 7-1 with their only loss coming against Michigan. Hess received first-team honors from the Central Press Association, and second-team honors from the Associated Press.

Hess was inducted in 1985 into the school's Men's Varsity "O" Hall of Fame.
