= 1925 Minnesota Golden Gophers football team =

American college football season

1925 Minnesota Golden Gophers football
- Conference: Big Ten Conference
- Record: 5–2–1 (1–1–1 Big Ten)
- Head coach: Clarence Spears (1st season)
- Captain: Herman Ascher
- Home stadium: Memorial Stadium

1925 Big Ten Conference football standings
	Conf.					Overall
Team	W		L		T	W		L		T
No. 2 Michigan $	5	–	1	–	0	7	–	1	–	0
Northwestern	3	–	1	–	0	5	–	3	–	0
No. 8 Wisconsin	3	–	1	–	1	6	–	1	–	1
Chicago	2	–	2	–	1	3	–	4	–	1
Illinois	2	–	2	–	0	5	–	3	–	0
Iowa	2	–	2	–	0	5	–	3	–	0
Minnesota	1	–	1	–	1	5	–	2	–	1
Ohio State	1	–	3	–	1	4	–	3	–	1
Indiana	0	–	3	–	1	3	–	4	–	1
Purdue	0	–	3	–	1	3	–	4	–	1
$ – Conference champion; Rankings from Dickinson System

The 1925 Minnesota Golden Gophers football team was an American football team that represented the University of Minnesota in the 1925 Big Ten Conference football season. In their first year under head coach Clarence Spears, the Golden Gophers compiled a 5–2–1 record and outscored their opponents by a combined score of 176 to 91.

Guard Len Walsh was named All-Big Ten first team.

Total attendance for the season was 193,707, which averaged out to 27,672 per game. The season high for attendance was against Notre Dame.

== Schedule ==
Date	Opponent	Site	Result	Attendance	Source
October 3	North Dakota*	Memorial Stadium; Minneapolis, MN	W 25–6	20,000	
October 10	Grinnell*	Memorial Stadium; Minneapolis, MN	W 34–6	18,000	
October 17	Wabash*	Memorial Stadium; Minneapolis, MN	W 32–6	18,000	
October 24	Notre Dame*	Memorial Stadium; Minneapolis, MN	L 7–19	52,000	
October 31	Wisconsin	Memorial Stadium; Minneapolis, MN (rivalry)	T 12–12	40,000	
November 7	Butler*	Memorial Stadium; Minneapolis, MN	W 33–7	20,000	
November 14	Iowa^{†}	Memorial Stadium; Minneapolis, MN (rivalry)	W 33–0	45,000	
November 21	at Michigan	Ferry Field; Ann Arbor, MI (Little Brown Jug)	L 0–35	47,000	
*Non-conference game; ^{†}Homecoming

== Game summaries ==
=== Michigan ===
Minnesota at Michigan

Team	1	2	3	4	Total
Minnesota	0	0	0	0	0
• Michigan	7	7	7	14	35

- Date: November 21, 1925
- Location: Ferry Field • Ann Arbor, MI
- Game attendance: 47,000
- Referee: Nichols (Oberlin)

Minnesota concluded its 1925 season with a 35–0 loss to Michigan. The game was played at Ferry Field before a sellout, homecoming crowd of 47,000 on a warm Indian summer afternoon. Minnesota came into the game with a 5–1–1 record and a highly touted offense featuring Herb Joesting that was averaging 25 points per game. More than 3,000 Minnesotans and the 100-piece Minnesota band traveled to Ann Arbor on five special trains.

The Associated Press wrote that Michigan won the game with "a driving line attack and a bewildering aerial game." Michigan's first touchdown drive was led by Benny Friedman's passing. He completed a pass to sophomore Bennie Oosterbaan for a 23-yard gain and followed with a pass to William Flora for an 11-yard gain. Fullback Bo Molenda then ran 24 yards for the touchdown, and Friedman kicked the extra point.

Michigan's second touchdown drive started with a 25-yard gain on a pass from Friedman to Oosterbaan. Sophomore halfback Louis Gilbert then ran 20 yards, and Molenda ran for the touchdown from the one-yard line. Friedman kicked the extra point, and Michigan led, 14–0, at halftime.

In the third quarter, Friedman threw a touchdown pass to Oosterbaan, and Friedman kicked his third extra point. In the fourth quarter, Minnesota opened up its passing game in an attempt to overcome Michigan's 21–0 lead. Halfway through the quarter, Louis Gilbert intercepted a pass and returned it 60 yards down the right side for a touchdown. In addition to the interception return, Gilbert also returned a punt 35 yards in the second quarter, handled the punting for Michigan, and was credited by the Chicago Daily Tribune with "sensational open field running."

Michigan's final touchdown was set up by another turnover, as Carl Stamman intercepted a pass and returned it 35 yards to the Minnesota nine-yard line. Friedman threw a pass to Oosterbaan for the touchdown. Friedman completed seven of 16 pass attempts for 130 yards and converted all five extra point kicks to give Michigan a 35–0 victory.

On defense, Michigan did not allow Minnesota to complete a pass and held the Gophers to four first downs, two in each half, and 45 net rushing yards. Minnesota ran an offense featuring the "Spear shift," named for the team's head coach Clarence Spears. The shift failed to gain against Michigan's line, leading the Chicago Daily Tribune to write:

"The famous Minnesota shift was a bloomer. The Gophers shifted and shifted and kept on shifting like a lot of hop toads and every time they shifted, the Michigan line shifted with them and knocked them flat as soon as the ball was snapped. To the Michigan team that shift was about as puzzling as a dog's bark."
