= 1925 Indiana Hoosiers football team =

American college football season

1925 Indiana Hoosiers football
- Conference: Big Ten Conference
- Record: 3–4–1 (0–3–1 Big Ten)
- Head coach: Bill Ingram (3rd season)
- MVP: Larry Marks
- Captain: Larry Marks
- Home stadium: Memorial Stadium

1925 Big Ten Conference football standings
| | Conf. | | | | | Overall |
| Team | W | | L | | T | W | | L | | T |
|---|---|---|---|---|---|---|---|---|---|---|
| No. 2 Michigan $ | 5 | – | 1 | – | 0 | 7 | – | 1 | – | 0 |
| Northwestern | 3 | – | 1 | – | 0 | 5 | – | 3 | – | 0 |
| No. 8 Wisconsin | 3 | – | 1 | – | 1 | 6 | – | 1 | – | 1 |
| Chicago | 2 | – | 2 | – | 1 | 3 | – | 4 | – | 1 |
| Illinois | 2 | – | 2 | – | 0 | 5 | – | 3 | – | 0 |
| Iowa | 2 | – | 2 | – | 0 | 5 | – | 3 | – | 0 |
| Minnesota | 1 | – | 1 | – | 1 | 5 | – | 2 | – | 1 |
| Ohio State | 1 | – | 3 | – | 1 | 4 | – | 3 | – | 1 |
| Indiana | 0 | – | 3 | – | 1 | 3 | – | 4 | – | 1 |
| Purdue | 0 | – | 3 | – | 1 | 3 | – | 4 | – | 1 |
$ – Conference champion; Rankings from Dickinson System

The 1925 Indiana Hoosiers football team represented the Indiana Hoosiers in the 1925 Big Ten Conference football season. The Hoosiers played their home games at Memorial Stadium in Bloomington, Indiana. The team was coached by Bill Ingram, in his third and final year as head coach.

The first game in the new Memorial Stadium was an October 3, 1925, victory over Indiana State. The dedication game occurred later in the season against Purdue.

== Schedule ==
| Date | Opponent | Site | Result | Attendance | Source |
|---|---|---|---|---|---|
| October 3 | Indiana State* | Memorial Stadium; Bloomington, IN | W 31–0 | | |
| October 10 | at Michigan | Ferry Field; Ann Arbor, MI | L 0–63 | 36,000 | |
| October 17 | Syracuse* | Memorial Stadium; Bloomington, IN | L 0–14 | 8,000 | |
| October 24 | Miami (OH)* | Memorial Stadium; Bloomington, IN | W 25–7 | | |
| October 31 | at Northwestern | Dyche Stadium; Evanston, IL | L 14–17 | | |
| November 7 | at Ohio State | Ohio Stadium; Columbus, OH | L 0–7 | 30,500 | |
| November 14 | Rose Polytechnic* | Memorial Stadium; Bloomington, IN | W 32–7 | | |
| November 21 | Purdue^{†} | Memorial Stadium; Bloomington, IN (Old Oaken Bucket) | T 0–0 | 15,000 | |
*Non-conference game; ^{†}Homecoming
