= 1925 Chicago Maroons football team =

American college football season

1925 Chicago Maroons football
- Conference: Big Ten Conference
- Record: 3–4–1 (2–2–1 Big Ten)
- Head coach: Amos Alonzo Stagg (34th season)
- Captain: Fred Henderson
- Home stadium: Stagg Field

Uniform
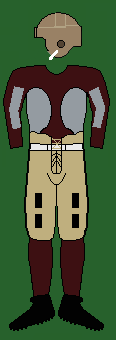

1925 Big Ten Conference football standings
	Conf.					Overall
Team	W		L		T	W		L		T
No. 2 Michigan $	5	–	1	–	0	7	–	1	–	0
Northwestern	3	–	1	–	0	5	–	3	–	0
No. 8 Wisconsin	3	–	1	–	1	6	–	1	–	1
Chicago	2	–	2	–	1	3	–	4	–	1
Illinois	2	–	2	–	0	5	–	3	–	0
Iowa	2	–	2	–	0	5	–	3	–	0
Minnesota	1	–	1	–	1	5	–	2	–	1
Ohio State	1	–	3	–	1	4	–	3	–	1
Indiana	0	–	3	–	1	3	–	4	–	1
Purdue	0	–	3	–	1	3	–	4	–	1
$ – Conference champion; Rankings from Dickinson System

The 1925 Chicago Maroons football team was an American football team that represented the University of Chicago during the 1925 Big Ten Conference football season In their 34th season under head coach Amos Alonzo Stagg, the Maroons compiled a 3–4–1 record, finished fourth in the Big Ten Conference, and were outscored by their opponents by a combined total of 76 to 44.

Fritz Crisler was an assistant coach on the team.

== Schedule ==
Date	Opponent	Site	Result	Attendance	Source
October 3	Kentucky*	Stagg Field; Chicago, IL	W 9–0	32,000	
October 10	Ohio State	Stagg Field; Chicago, IL	T 3–3	35,000	
October 17	Northwestern	Stagg Field; Chicago, IL	W 6–0	34,000	
October 24	at Penn*	Franklin Field; Philadelphia, PA	L 0–7	55,000	
October 31	Purdue	Stagg Field; Chicago, IL (rivalry)	W 6–0	34,000	
November 7	at Illinois	Memorial Stadium; Champaign, IL	L 6–13	68,864	
November 14	Dartmouth*	Stagg Field; Chicago, IL	L 7–33	34,000	
November 21	Wisconsin	Stagg Field; Chicago, IL	L 7–20	34,000	
*Non-conference game
