= George Babcock (American football) =

American football player, coach and athletic director (1899–1988)

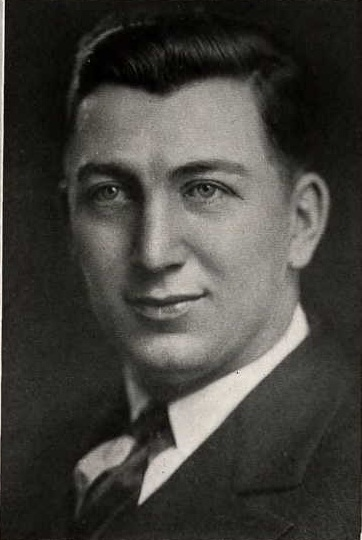
- Babcock from The Cincinnatian, 1929

Biographical details
- Born: March 21, 1899; Illinois, U.S.
- Died: February 27, 1988 (aged 88); Greenville, Michigan, U.S.

Playing career
- 1923–1925: Michigan
- Position: Tackle

Coaching career (HC unless noted)
- 1926: Akron
- 1927–1930: Cincinnati

Administrative career (AD unless noted)
- 1927–1932: Cincinnati

Head coaching record
- Overall: 17–23–5

Richard George Babcock (March 21, 1899 – February 27, 1988) was an American college football player and coach, and athletics administrator. He played football at the University of Michigan from 1923 to 1925 and served as the head football coach at the University of Akron in 1926 and at the University of Cincinnati from 1927 to 1930. He also served as the University of Cincinnati's athletic director from 1927 to 1932.

== Early years ==
Babcock was born in Illinois, and grew up in Royal Oak, Michigan. In 1918, he was living in River Rouge, Michigan, and working as an electrician for the Great Lakes Engineering Works, a shipbuilding company. At the time of the 1920 United States Census, he was living in Detroit, Michigan, and working as a hotel clerk.

== University of Michigan ==
Babcock attended the University of Michigan where he played college football for the Michigan Wolverines football team from 1923 to 1925. He was 5 feet, 11 inches tall, and weighed 180 pounds while playing for Michigan. At age 26, he was a starter at tackle for the 1925 Michigan Wolverines football team that outscored its opponents by a combined score of 227 to 3 for the season. While attending Michigan, Babcock studied education and was a member of the Beta Theta Pi fraternity and of the Sphinx and Michigamua.

== Coaching career ==
=== Akron ===
In February 1926, the Municipal University of Akron, now known as the University of Akron, announced that it had chosen Babcock as its new football and track coach. Babcock let the Akron Zips football team to a 5–2–2 record during the 1926 season.

=== Cincinnati ===
In March 1927, Babcock was hired as a professor of athletics and physical training at the University of Cincinnati. From 1927 to 1930, he was the head football coach of the Cincinnati Bearcats football team, compiling a 12–21–3 record. At the time of the 1930 United States census, Babcock was living in Cincinnati with his wife, Aneeta, whom he married in approximately 1929. His occupation was listed as the athletic director of the University of Cincinnati. In November 1928, Babcock, in his capacity as Cincinnati's athletic director, hired Frank E. Rice, another former University of Michigan athlete, to serve as the Bearcats' head basketball coach. Babcock continued to serve as Cincinnati's athletic director until the fall of 1932.

Babcock's overall record as a college football head coach was 17–23–5.

== Head coaching record ==
Year	Team	Overall	Conference	Standing	Bowl/playoffs
Akron (Ohio Athletic Conference) (1926)
1926	Akron	5–2–2	4–2–2	T–10th	
Akron:		5–2–2	4–2–2		
Cincinnati Bearcats (Ohio Athletic Conference / Buckeye Athletic Association) (1927)
1927	Cincinnati	2–5–2	0–4–2 / 0–3–1	T–20th / 6th	
Cincinnati Bearcats (Buckeye Athletic Association) (1928–1930)
1928	Cincinnati	1–8	0–5	6th	
1929	Cincinnati	4–4–1	0–4–1	T–5th	
1930	Cincinnati	5–4	2–2	3rd	
Cincinnati:		12–21–3	2–15–3		
Total:		17–23–5			
