= 1925 Illinois Fighting Illini football team =

American college football season

1925 Illinois Fighting Illini football
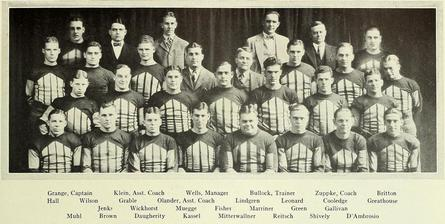
- Conference: Big Ten Conference
- Record: 5–3 (2–2 Big Ten)
- Head coach: Robert Zuppke (13th season)
- Offensive scheme: Single-wing
- Captain: Red Grange
- Home stadium: Memorial Stadium

Uniform
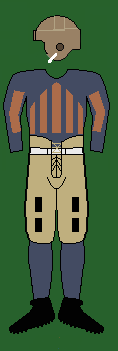

1925 Big Ten Conference football standings
| | Conf. | | | | | Overall |
| Team | W | | L | | T | W | | L | | T |
|---|---|---|---|---|---|---|---|---|---|---|
| No. 2 Michigan $ | 5 | – | 1 | – | 0 | 7 | – | 1 | – | 0 |
| Northwestern | 3 | – | 1 | – | 0 | 5 | – | 3 | – | 0 |
| No. 8 Wisconsin | 3 | – | 1 | – | 1 | 6 | – | 1 | – | 1 |
| Chicago | 2 | – | 2 | – | 1 | 3 | – | 4 | – | 1 |
| Illinois | 2 | – | 2 | – | 0 | 5 | – | 3 | – | 0 |
| Iowa | 2 | – | 2 | – | 0 | 5 | – | 3 | – | 0 |
| Minnesota | 1 | – | 1 | – | 1 | 5 | – | 2 | – | 1 |
| Ohio State | 1 | – | 3 | – | 1 | 4 | – | 3 | – | 1 |
| Indiana | 0 | – | 3 | – | 1 | 3 | – | 4 | – | 1 |
| Purdue | 0 | – | 3 | – | 1 | 3 | – | 4 | – | 1 |
$ – Conference champion; Rankings from Dickinson System

The 1925 Illinois Fighting Illini football team was an American football team that represented the University of Illinois during the 1925 Big Ten Conference football season. In their 13th season under head coach Robert Zuppke, the Illini compiled a 5–3 record and finished in a tie for fifth place in the Big Ten Conference.

This was the final season for hall-of-fame All-American halfback Harold "Red" Grange. Grange was also the team captain.

== Schedule ==
| Date | Opponent | Site | Result | Attendance | Source |
|---|---|---|---|---|---|
| October 3 | Nebraska* | Memorial Stadium; Champaign, IL | L 0–14 | 40,000 | |
| October 10 | Butler* | Memorial Stadium; Champaign, IL | W 16–13 | 12,599 | |
| October 17 | at Iowa | Iowa Field; Iowa City, IA | L 10–12 | 24,738 | |
| October 24 | Michigan | Memorial Stadium; Champaign, IL (rivalry) | L 0–3 | 66,609 | |
| October 31 | at Penn* | Franklin Field; Philadelphia, PA | W 24–2 | 60,000 | |
| November 7 | Chicago | Memorial Stadium; Champaign, IL | W 13–6 | 68,864 | |
| November 14 | Wabash* | Memorial Stadium; Champaign, IL | W 21–0 | 20,466 | |
| November 21 | at Ohio State | Ohio Stadium; Columbus, OH (Illibuck) | W 14–9 | 72,657 | |
*Non-conference game

== Awards and honors ==
- Red Grange, halfback: Consensus All-American
- Chuck Kassel, end: All-American
- Bernie Shively, guard: All-American
