= 1925 Northwestern Wildcats football team =

American college football season

1925 Northwestern Wildcats football
- Conference: Big Ten Conference
- Record: 5–3 (3–1 Big Ten)
- Head coach: Glenn Thistlethwaite (4th season)
- Captain: Tim Lowry
- Home stadium: Northwestern Field

Uniform
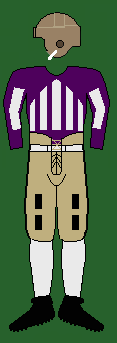

1925 Big Ten Conference football standings
	Conf.					Overall
Team	W		L		T	W		L		T
No. 2 Michigan $	5	–	1	–	0	7	–	1	–	0
Northwestern	3	–	1	–	0	5	–	3	–	0
No. 8 Wisconsin	3	–	1	–	1	6	–	1	–	1
Chicago	2	–	2	–	1	3	–	4	–	1
Illinois	2	–	2	–	0	5	–	3	–	0
Iowa	2	–	2	–	0	5	–	3	–	0
Minnesota	1	–	1	–	1	5	–	2	–	1
Ohio State	1	–	3	–	1	4	–	3	–	1
Indiana	0	–	3	–	1	3	–	4	–	1
Purdue	0	–	3	–	1	3	–	4	–	1
$ – Conference champion; Rankings from Dickinson System

The 1925 Northwestern Wildcats team represented Northwestern University during the 1925 Big Ten Conference football season. In their fourth year under head coach Glenn Thistlethwaite, the Wildcats compiled a 5–3 record (3–1 against Big Ten Conference opponents) and finished in second place in the Big Ten Conference.

== Schedule ==
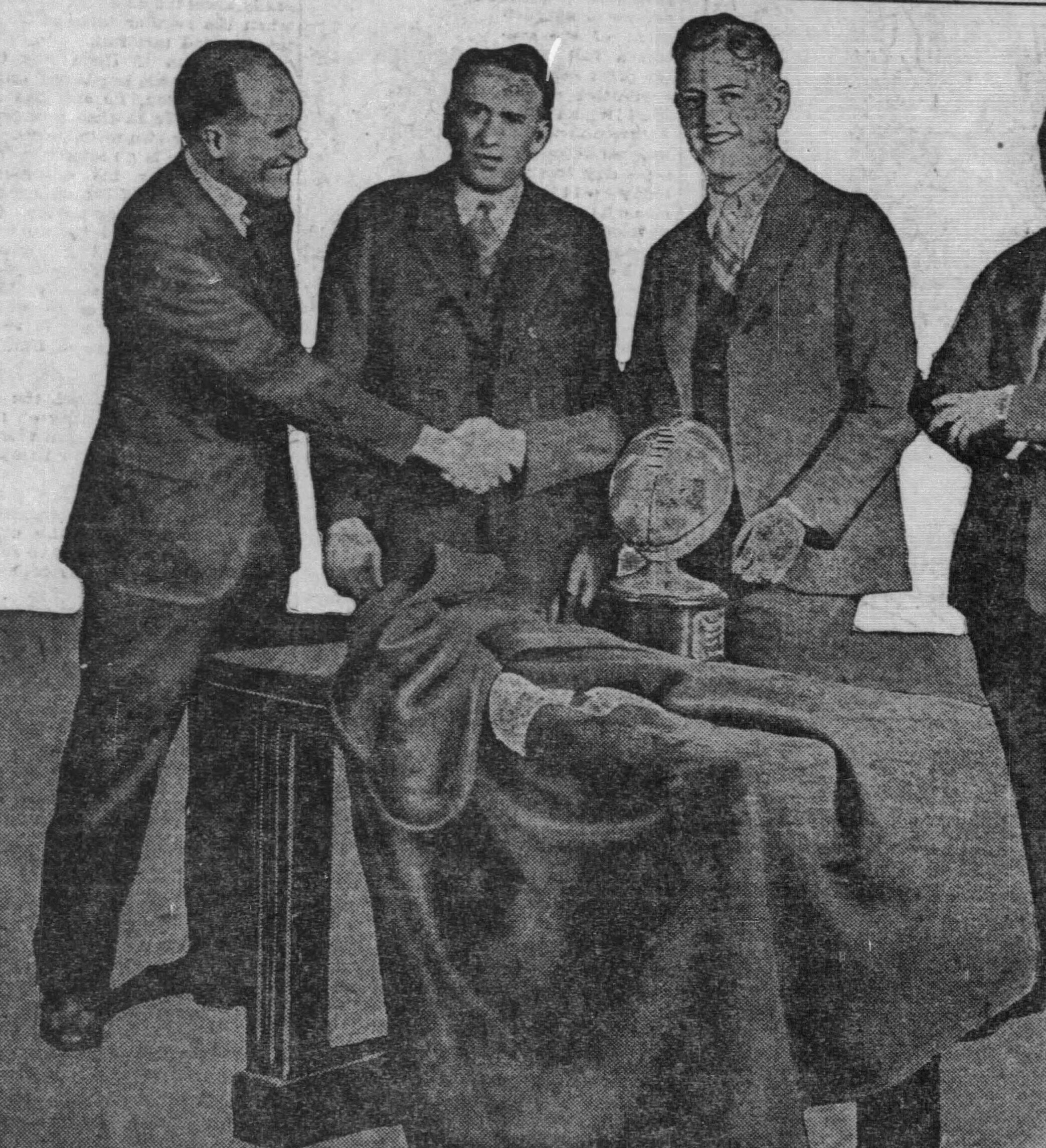
Tim Lowry (right) receiving the 1925 Chicago Tribune Silver Football. At the left is Coach Glenn Thistlethwaite and at the center is Athletics Director Kenneth L. Wilson

Date	Opponent	Site	Result	Attendance	Source
October 3	South Dakota*	Dyche Stadium; Evanston, IL	W 14–7	18,000	
October 10	Carleton*	Dyche Stadium; Evanston, IL	W 17–0	11,000	
October 17	at Chicago	Stagg Field; Chicago, IL	L 0–6	34,000	
October 24	vs. Tulane*	Stagg Field; Chicago, IL	L 7–18	15,000	
October 31	Indiana	Dyche Stadium; Evanston, IL	W 17–14		
November 7	Michigan	Soldier Field; Chicago, IL (rivalry)	W 3–2		
November 14	at Purdue	Ross–Ade Stadium; West Lafayette, IN	W 13–9		
November 21	at Notre Dame*	Cartier Field; Notre Dame, IN (rivalry)	L 10–13	32,000	
*Non-conference game
