= Tom Edwards (American football) =

American football player (1899–1980)

- Born: December 12, 1899
- Died: January 28, 1980 (aged 80)
- Citizenship: United States
- Education: University of Michigan
- Known for: All-American, 1925
- Height: 5 ft 11 in (180 cm)

Thomas Leighton Edwards (December 12, 1899 – January 28, 1980) was an American football player. He played college football at the University of Michigan, where he was an All-American tackle for the Michigan Wolverines. Edward played professional football for one season, in 1926, with the New York Yankees of the American Football League and the Detroit Panthers of the National Football League (NFL).

== Youth ==
A native of Traverse City, Michigan, Edwards was a second generation Wolverine football player. His father, Randolph Thomas Edwards (known as R.T.), was a rusher for the 1879 Michigan Wolverines football team, the first intercollegiate football squad to represent the University of Michigan. His grandparents, Thomas Edwards and Elizabeth Harriet, immigrated to Michigan from Brownsover, Warwickshire in England, just 1.5 miles from Rugby, Warwickshire.

== University of Michigan ==
Edwards attended the University of Michigan where he earned his first letter as a football player in 1924. In 1925, he played guard and tackle for the Michigan Wolverines squad that legendary coach Fielding H. Yost called "the best team I ever coached." Edwards suffered a torn ligament injury in October 1925, and started only five of Michigan's eight games in 1925.

In 1925, Billy Evans wrote: "The consensus is that Edwards of Michigan is the best tackle in the Big Ten. However, the fact that he has been out of the game so much because of injuries caused the experts to relegate him to the second team. At getting down the field, Edwards is a wonder and when he tackles an opponent he stays tackled. But due to the limited amount he has played it would be almost unfair to rate him ahead of men who have been in every game." Evans' omission of Edwards from his All-Western team drew criticism from another writer who opined: "Most sports writers will agree that Edwards is one of the greatest tackles ever to be produced at any school and is justly deserving of All-American selection, let alone All-Conference."

Edwards was named as a first-team All-American at right tackle by Walter Eckersall of the Chicago Tribune. Eckersall said: "Edwards made his presence felt in every Michigan game." Edwards was also selected as a second-team All-American by Grantland Rice for Collier's Weekly and Norman E. Brown. He was also selected to play in the inaugural East–West Shrine Game on December 26, 1925, in San Francisco. The 1925 Michigan team had six All-Americans, including Edwards, Bennie Oosterbaan, Benny Friedman, Robert J. Brown, Bo Molenda and Harry Hawkins.

== Professional football ==
In 1926, Edwards played for the American Football League's New York Yankees with Red Grange, Angus Goetz, and Paul G. Goebel. He also played in 12 games for the Detroit Panthers of the National Football League (NFL) in 1926.

== Later years ==
After his career as a football player ended, Edwards became the athletic director for the Detroit Police Department. He also appraised real estate and lived in Dearborn, Michigan for many years. In the 1960s, he purchased the family farm outside of Central Lake, Michigan and lived there until his death. He wrote a column for the local paper called "The Old Crab."

Edwards died in Clearwater, Florida at age 80 in 1980. In the summer of the same year, the family farm built by his maternal grandfather, S. B. Anway, celebrated its centennial anniversary. He was buried at Lakeview Cemetery in Torch Lake, Michigan.

== See also ==
- 1925 College Football All-America Team
- List of Michigan Wolverines football All-Americans
