= 1925 Iowa Hawkeyes football team =

American college football season

1925 Iowa Hawkeyes football
- Conference: Big Ten Conference
- Record: 5–3 (2–2 Big Ten)
- Head coach: Burt Ingwersen (2nd season)
- MVP: Donald Graham
- Captain: Hal Griffen
- Home stadium: Iowa Field

1925 Big Ten Conference football standings
	Conf.					Overall
Team	W		L		T	W		L		T
No. 2 Michigan $	5	–	1	–	0	7	–	1	–	0
Northwestern	3	–	1	–	0	5	–	3	–	0
No. 8 Wisconsin	3	–	1	–	1	6	–	1	–	1
Chicago	2	–	2	–	1	3	–	4	–	1
Illinois	2	–	2	–	0	5	–	3	–	0
Iowa	2	–	2	–	0	5	–	3	–	0
Minnesota	1	–	1	–	1	5	–	2	–	1
Ohio State	1	–	3	–	1	4	–	3	–	1
Indiana	0	–	3	–	1	3	–	4	–	1
Purdue	0	–	3	–	1	3	–	4	–	1
$ – Conference champion; Rankings from Dickinson System

The 1925 Iowa Hawkeyes football team was an American football team that represented the University of Iowa as a member of the Big Ten Conference during the 1925 Big Ten football season. In its second season under head coach Burt Ingwersen, the team compiled a 5–3 record (2–2 against conference opponents) and outscored opponents by a total of 121 to 74. The team played its home games at Iowa Field in Iowa City, Iowa.

== Schedule ==
Date	Opponent	Site	Result	Attendance	Source
October 3	Arkansas*	Iowa Field; Iowa City, IA	W 26–0		
October 10	Saint Louis*	Iowa Field; Iowa City, IA	W 41–0		
October 17	Illinois^{†}	Iowa Field; Iowa City, IA	W 12–10	24,738	
October 24	at Ohio State	Ohio Stadium; Columbus, OH	W 15–0	33,000	
October 31	Wabash*	Iowa Field; Iowa City, IA	W 28–7		
November 7	Wisconsin	Iowa Field; Iowa City, IA (rivalry)	L 0–6	10,000	
November 14	at Minnesota	Memorial Stadium; Minneapolis, MN (rivalry)	L 0–33	45,000	
November 21	at USC*	Los Angeles Memorial Coliseum; Los Angeles, CA	L 0–18	66,000	
*Non-conference game; ^{†}Homecoming
