= 1925 Wisconsin Badgers football team =

American college football season

1925 Wisconsin Badgers football
- Conference: Big Ten Conference
- Record: 6–1–1 (3–1–1 Big Ten)
- Head coach: George Little (1st season)
- Captain: Steve Polaski
- Home stadium: Camp Randall Stadium

Uniform
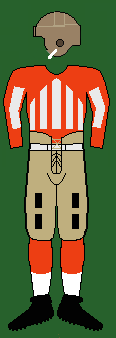

1925 Big Ten Conference football standings
	Conf.					Overall
Team	W		L		T	W		L		T
No. 2 Michigan $	5	–	1	–	0	7	–	1	–	0
Northwestern	3	–	1	–	0	5	–	3	–	0
No. 8 Wisconsin	3	–	1	–	1	6	–	1	–	1
Chicago	2	–	2	–	1	3	–	4	–	1
Illinois	2	–	2	–	0	5	–	3	–	0
Iowa	2	–	2	–	0	5	–	3	–	0
Minnesota	1	–	1	–	1	5	–	2	–	1
Ohio State	1	–	3	–	1	4	–	3	–	1
Indiana	0	–	3	–	1	3	–	4	–	1
Purdue	0	–	3	–	1	3	–	4	–	1
$ – Conference champion; Rankings from Dickinson System

The 1925 Wisconsin Badgers football team was an American football team that represented the University of Wisconsin in the 1925 Big Ten Conference football season. The team compiled a 6–1–1 record (3–1–1 against conference opponents), finished in third place in the Big Ten Conference, and outscored all opponents by a combined total of 131 to 50. George Little was in his first year as Wisconsin's head coach. The team was ranked No. 8 in the nation in the Dickinson System ratings released in January 1926. Little had been the head coach at Michigan in 1924; the Badgers suffered their only defeat of the 1925 season to Little's former team.

Steve Polaski was the team captain. Halfback Doyle Harmon was selected by Walter Eckersall as a first-team player on the 1925 All-Big Ten Conference football team.

The team played its home games at Camp Randall Stadium. The capacity was more than doubled for the 1925 season from 14,000 to 29,783. During the 1925 season, the average attendance at home games was 15,118.

== Schedule ==
Date	Opponent	Site	Result	Attendance	Source
October 3	Iowa State*	Camp Randall Stadium; Madison, WI	W 30–0	10,000	
October 10	Franklin (IN)*	Camp Randall Stadium; Madison, WI	W 35–0		
October 17	Michigan^{†}	Camp Randall Stadium; Madison, WI	L 0–21	44,000	
October 24	Purdue	Camp Randall Stadium; Madison, WI	W 7–0	14,000	
October 31	at Minnesota	Memorial Stadium; Minneapolis, MN (rivalry)	T 12–12	40,000	
November 7	at Iowa	Iowa Field; Iowa City, IA (rivalry)	W 6–0		
November 14	Michigan State*	Camp Randall Stadium; Madison, WI	W 21–10		
November 21	at Chicago	Stagg Field; Chicago, IL	W 20–7	34,000	
*Non-conference game; ^{†}Homecoming
