= 1925 Purdue Boilermakers football team =

American college football season

1925 Purdue Boilermakers football
- Conference: Big Ten Conference
- Record: 3–4–1 (0–3–1 Big Ten)
- Head coach: James Phelan (4th season)
- Captain: Harold L. Harmeson
- Home stadium: Ross–Ade Stadium

1925 Big Ten Conference football standings
	Conf.					Overall
Team	W		L		T	W		L		T
No. 2 Michigan $	5	–	1	–	0	7	–	1	–	0
Northwestern	3	–	1	–	0	5	–	3	–	0
No. 8 Wisconsin	3	–	1	–	1	6	–	1	–	1
Chicago	2	–	2	–	1	3	–	4	–	1
Illinois	2	–	2	–	0	5	–	3	–	0
Iowa	2	–	2	–	0	5	–	3	–	0
Minnesota	1	–	1	–	1	5	–	2	–	1
Ohio State	1	–	3	–	1	4	–	3	–	1
Indiana	0	–	3	–	1	3	–	4	–	1
Purdue	0	–	3	–	1	3	–	4	–	1
$ – Conference champion; Rankings from Dickinson System

The 1925 Purdue Boilermakers football team was an American football team that represented Purdue University during the 1925 Big Ten Conference football season. In their fourth season under head coach James Phelan, the Boilermakers compiled a 3–4–1 record, finished in last place in the Big Ten Conference with an 0–3–1 record against conference opponents, and outscored opponents by a total of 119 to 39. Harold L. Harmeson was the team captain.

== Schedule ==
Date	Opponent	Site	Result	Attendance	Source
October 3	Wabash*	Ross–Ade Stadium; West Lafayette, IN	L 7–13		
October 10	DePauw*	Ross–Ade Stadium; West Lafayette, IN	W 39–0		
October 17	Rose Polytechnic*	Ross–Ade Stadium; West Lafayette, IN	W 44–0		
October 24	at Wisconsin	Camp Randall Stadium; Madison, WI	L 0–7	14,000	
October 31	at Chicago	Stagg Field; Chicago, IL (rivalry)	L 0–6	34,000	
November 7	Franklin*	Ross–Ade Stadium; West Lafayette, IN	W 20–0		
November 14	Northwestern^{†}	Ross–Ade Stadium; West Lafayette, IN	L 9–13		
November 21	at Indiana	Memorial Stadium; Bloomington, IN (Old Oaken Bucket)	T 0–0	15,000	
*Non-conference game; ^{†}Homecoming

== Roster ==
- Phillip Anderson, G
- J. T. Bolan, T
- Don Cunningham
- Larry Deephouse, G
- Harold Harmeson, RH
- Harry Hetrick, FB
- Tom Hogan, E
- Abraham Koranksy, FB
- Sylvan Leichtle, RH
- B. T. Merkobrad, HB
- C. Horace Pillman, E
- Albert Rabe, C
- E. Ravenscraft, E
- Walter Scholl, E
- G. P. Snow, T
- A. L. Spencer, G
- John Stillwell, E
- Mel Taube, QB
- Chester Wilcox, HB
- Robert Wilson, QB
- Herm Winkler, T
