= Charles Grube =

American football player (1904–1976)

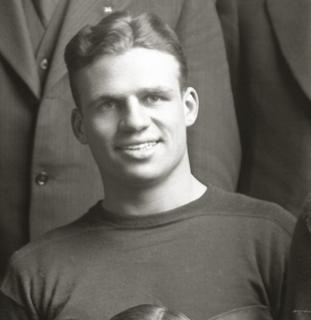

No. 9
- Position: End

Personal information
- Born: June 11, 1904; Saginaw, Michigan, U.S.
- Died: January 21, 1976 (aged 71); Hollywood, Florida, U.S.
- Listed height: 5 ft 10 in (1.78 m)
- Listed weight: 175 lb (79 kg)

Career information
- High school: Arthur Hill (Saginaw, Michigan)
- College: Michigan (1923–1925)

Career history
- Detroit Panthers (1926)

Charles William Grube (June 11, 1904 – January 21, 1976) was an American football player.

== Biography ==
Grube was born in 1904 in Saginaw, Michigan, attended Arthur Hill High School in that city. He then enrolled at the University of Michigan where he played college football at the end position for the Michigan Wolverines football team from 1923 to 1925. He played at fullback in 1923, but was moved to end in 1925. At the time, one sports writer noted: "Grube has all the essentials of a good end ... He is a sure and hard tackler can handle a ball and is perhaps a better on defense than he is on offense." He played on the 1925 Michigan Wolverines football team that included quarterback Benny Friedman and fellow end Bennie Oosterbaan.

Grube later played professional football for the Detroit Panthers in 1926. He appeared in two games for the Panthers, one of them as a starter.

In the 1930s, Grube was a football coach at Eastern High School in Lansing, Michigan and his alma mater, Arthur Hill High School, in Saganaw.

Grube died in 1976 at age 72 while residing in Hollywood, Florida.
