= 1925 Ohio State Buckeyes football team =

American college football season

1925 Ohio State Buckeyes football
- Conference: Big Ten Conference
- Record: 4–3–1 (1–3–1 Big Ten)
- Head coach: John Wilce (13th season)
- Home stadium: Ohio Stadium

1925 Big Ten Conference football standings
	Conf.					Overall
Team	W		L		T	W		L		T
No. 2 Michigan $	5	–	1	–	0	7	–	1	–	0
Northwestern	3	–	1	–	0	5	–	3	–	0
No. 8 Wisconsin	3	–	1	–	1	6	–	1	–	1
Chicago	2	–	2	–	1	3	–	4	–	1
Illinois	2	–	2	–	0	5	–	3	–	0
Iowa	2	–	2	–	0	5	–	3	–	0
Minnesota	1	–	1	–	1	5	–	2	–	1
Ohio State	1	–	3	–	1	4	–	3	–	1
Indiana	0	–	3	–	1	3	–	4	–	1
Purdue	0	–	3	–	1	3	–	4	–	1
$ – Conference champion; Rankings from Dickinson System

The 1925 Ohio State Buckeyes football team was an American football team that represented Ohio State University in the 1925 Big Ten Conference football season. In its 13th season under head coach John Wilce, the team compiled a 4–3–1 record and outscored opponents by a total of 55 to 45, but lost for the fourth straight season to Michigan.

== Schedule ==
Date	Opponent	Site	Result	Attendance	Source
October 3	Ohio Wesleyan*	Ohio Stadium; Columbus, OH	W 10–3	45,000	
October 10	at Chicago	Stagg Field; Chicago, IL	T 3–3	35,000	
October 17	Columbia*	Ohio Stadium; Columbus, OH	W 9–0		
October 24	Iowa	Ohio Stadium; Columbus, OH	L 0–15	33,000	
October 31	Wooster*	Ohio Stadium; Columbus, OH	W 17–0	17,000	
November 7	Indiana	Ohio Stadium; Columbus, OH	W 7–0	30,500	
November 14	at Michigan	Ferry Field; Ann Arbor, MI (rivalry)	L 0–10	50,000	
November 21	Illinois	Ohio Stadium; Columbus, OH (Illibuck)	L 9–14	72,657	
*Non-conference game

== Coaching staff ==
- John Wilce, head coach, 13th year
