= Glenn Thistlethwaite =

American football player and sports coach (1885–1956)

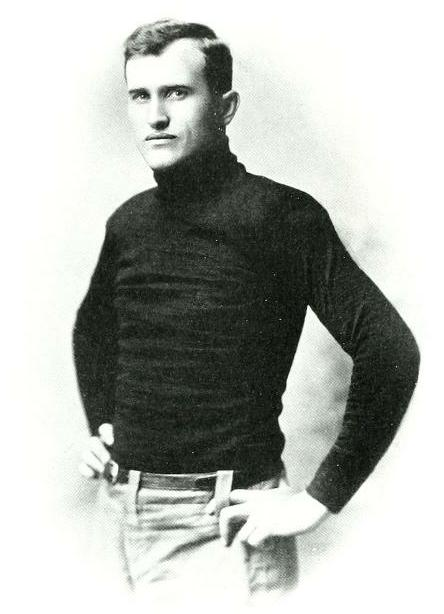
- Thistlethwaite pictured in Sargasso 1913, Earlham yearbook

Biographical details
- Born: March 18, 1885; Franklin, Indiana, U.S.
- Died: October 6, 1956 (aged 71); Richmond, Virginia, U.S.

Playing career

Football
- 1905–1907: Earlham
- Position: Tackle

Coaching career (HC unless noted)

Football
- 1908: Illinois College
- 1909–1912: Earlham
- 1910s: Oak Park HS (IL)
- 1922–1926: Northwestern
- 1927–1931: Wisconsin
- 1932–1933: Carroll (WI)
- 1934–1941: Richmond

Basketball
- 1909–1913: Earlham

Baseball
- 1908–1909: Illinois College
- 1910–1911: Earlham
- 1913: Earlham

Track and field
- 1935–1941: Richmond

Administrative career (AD unless noted)
- 1932–1934: Carroll (WI)
- 1934–1942: Richmond

Head coaching record
- Overall: 117–74–16 (college football); 30–28–1 (college basketball); 18–17–1 (college baseball)

Accomplishments and honors

Championships
- Football; 1 Big Ten (1926); 1 Virginia (1934)

Glenn Franklin Thistlethwaite (March 18, 1885 – October 6, 1956) was an American football, basketball, baseball, and track and field coach and athletics administrator. He served as the head football coach at Illinois College (1908), Earlham College (1909–1912), Northwestern University (1922–1926), the University of Wisconsin–Madison (1927–1931), Carroll College—now known as Carroll University—in Waukesha, Wisconsin (1932–1933), and the University of Richmond (1934–1941), compiling a career college football record of 117–74–16. Coaching at Northwestern from 1922 to 1926, Thistlethwaite compiled a 21–17–1 record, making him one of the most successful coaches in Northwestern Wildcats football history. In 1926, his team won a share of the Big Ten Conference title, only the second in school history, and his tenure sparked a revival in Northwestern football after a post-World War I decline. From 1927 to 1931, Thistlethwaite coached at Wisconsin, tallying a 26–16–3 mark. From 1934 to 1941, he coached at Richmond, where he oversaw the school's entry into the Southern Conference in 1936. Born in Franklin, Indiana in 1885, Thistlethwaite died at the age of 71, on October 6, 1956, of a heart attack at a hospital in Richmond, Virginia.

== Coaching career ==
=== Northwestern ===
Thistlethwaite was the 15th head football coach at Northwestern University in Evanston, Illinois and held that position for five seasons, from 1922 until 1926. His record at Northwestern was 21–17–1.

=== Carroll ===
Thistlethwaite was the 17th head football coach at Carroll College—now known as Carroll University—in Waukesha, Wisconsin and held that position for two seasons, from 1932 until 1933. His record at Carroll College was 10–2–1.

== Head coaching record ==
=== College football ===
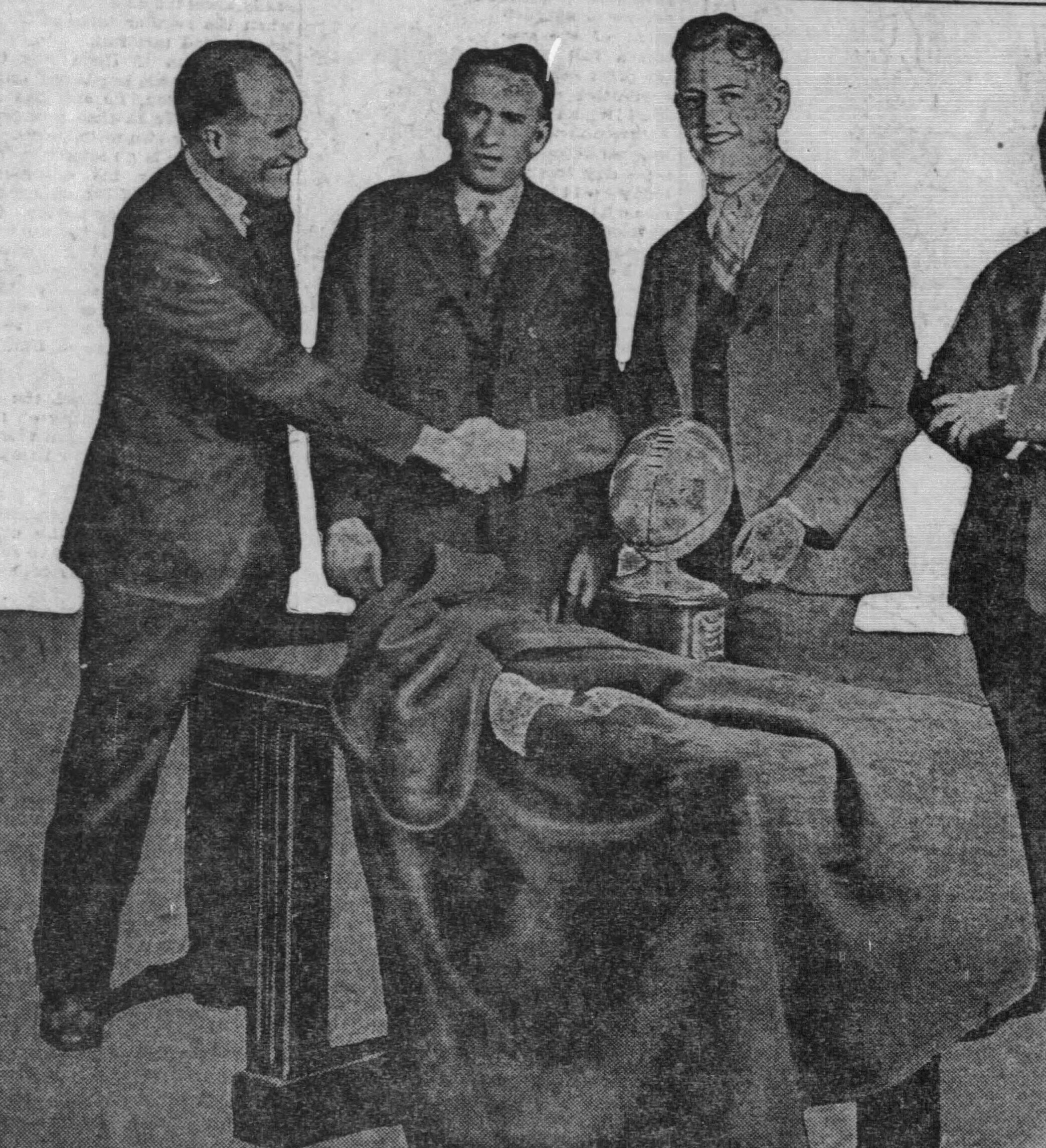
Thistlethwaite (left) shakes the hand of Tim Lowry (right) as Lowry receives the 1925 Chicago Tribune Silver Football. In between them is Athletics Director Kenneth L. Wilson

Year	Team	Overall	Conference	Standing	Bowl/playoffs
Illinois College Blue Boys (Independent) (1908)
1908	Illinois College	1–4–2			
Illinois College:		1–4–2			
Earlham Quakers (Independent) (1909–1912)
1909	Earlham	5–1			
1910	Earlham	3–3			
1911	Earlham	6–1			
1912	Earlham	4–4			
Earlham:		18–9			
Northwestern Purple/Wildcats (Big Ten Conference) (1922–1926)
1922	Northwestern	3–3–1	1–3–1	7th	
1923	Northwestern	2–6	0–6	10th	
1924	Northwestern	4–4	1–3	8th	
1925	Northwestern	5–3	3–1	T–2nd	
1926	Northwestern	7–1	5–1	T–1st	
Northwestern:		21–17–1	10–13–1		
Wisconsin Badgers (Big Ten Conference) (1927–1931)
1927	Wisconsin	4–4	1–4	T–9th	
1928	Wisconsin	7–1–1	3–1–1	2nd	
1929	Wisconsin	4–5	1–4	10th	
1930	Wisconsin	6–2–1	2–2–1	T–4th	
1931	Wisconsin	5–4–1	3–3	6th	
Wisconsin:		26–16–3	10–14–2		
Carroll Pioneers (Big Four Conference) (1932–1933)
1932	Carroll	4–2	2–1	2nd	
Carroll Pioneers (Independent) (1932–1933)
1933	Carroll	6–0–1			
Carroll:		10–2–1	2–1		
Richmond Spiders (Virginia Conference) (1934–1935)
1934	Richmond	8–1	2–1	T–1st	
1935	Richmond	3–3–3	1–1–1		
Richmond Spiders (Southern Conference) (1936–1941)
1936	Richmond	4–4–2	1–3	13th	
1937	Richmond	5–4–1	2–3	T–8th	
1938	Richmond	6–3–1	3–2–1	5th	
1939	Richmond	7–1–2	3–1–1	T–4th	
1940	Richmond	6–3	3–2	T–5th	
1941	Richmond	2–7	0–6	16th	
Richmond:		41–26–9	15–19–3		
Total:		117–74–16			
National championship Conference title Conference division title or championship game berth
