= Bruce Gregory (American football) =

American football player (1903–1960)

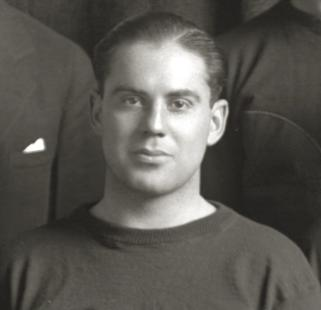

No. 44
- Position: Halfback

Personal information
- Born: May 13, 1903; Battle Creek, Michigan
- Died: December 26, 1960 (aged 57) near Frederick, Maryland
- Listed height: 5 ft 10 in (1.78 m)
- Listed weight: 170 lb (77 kg)

Career information
- High school: Ann Arbor (Ann Arbor, Michigan)
- College: Michigan (1924–1925)

Career history
- Detroit Panthers (1926)

Bruce Robert Gregory (May 13, 1903 – December 26, 1960) was an American football player.

Gregory was born in 1903 in Battle Creek, Michigan. He moved to Ann Arbor, Michigan, as a boy. He played halfback for the Michigan Wolverines football team from 1924 to 1925.

Gregory later played professional football for the Detroit Panthers in 1926. He played in all 12 games for the Panthers in 1926, including 11 games as a starter.

Gregory worked in the tire business after his football career ended, living in Flint, Michigan, Akron, Ohio, and Frederick, Maryland. He worked for many years for the General Tire and Rubber Company and also owned a tire dealership in Maryland. He was killed at age 57 in an automobile accident in 1960 near Frederick, Maryland.
