= Robert J. Brown =

Robert Brown
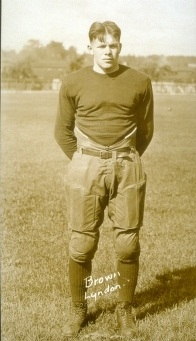
- Robert Brown, captain of Michigan's 1925 football team

Profile
- Position: Center

Personal information
- Born: August 23, 1904; Toledo, Ohio, U.S.
- Died: April 29, 1985 (aged 80); Kalamazoo, Michigan, U.S.

Career information
- College: Michigan

Career history
- 1923–1925: Michigan

Awards and highlights
- National champion (1923); First-team All-American (1925); First-team All-Big Ten (1925)

Robert J. Brown (August 23, 1904 – April 29, 1985) was an American football center and university regent.

Brown was born in Toledo, Ohio, in 1904.

He played college football for the University of Michigan from 1923 to 1925. As a senior, he was the captain of the 1925 Michigan Wolverines football team that head coach Fielding H. Yost called the greatest team he ever coached. The 1925 Wolverines team outscored opponents by a total of 227 to 3. Yost called Brown, "One of the greatest inspirational leaders I have seen." At the end of the 1925 season, he was selected as a first-team All-American by multiple selectors, including International News Service, the Newspaper Enterprise Association, Liberty magazine, Athlete & Sportman magazine, Billy Evans, Norman E. Brown, and Sam Willaman. He was named to the second team by the Associated Press and Collier's magazine.

From 1930, Brown lived in Kalamazoo, Michigan. He was associated with Hapman-Dutton Mfg. Co. of Kalamazoo and U.S. Pressed Steel Products in Ypsilanti and Kalamazoo. He was also chairman of the Kalamazoo County Board of Supervisors. In 1966, he ran as a Republican for the University of Michigan Board of Regents as a Republican and served as a Regent from 1967 to 1974.

His son, Robert M. Brown was captain of the 1962 Michigan Wolverines football team, giving them the distinction of being the only father and son football players for the University of Michigan who both served as team captains.

Brown died in 1985 in Kalamazoo, Michigan.
