= Tim Lowry =

American football player and lawyer (1905–1983)

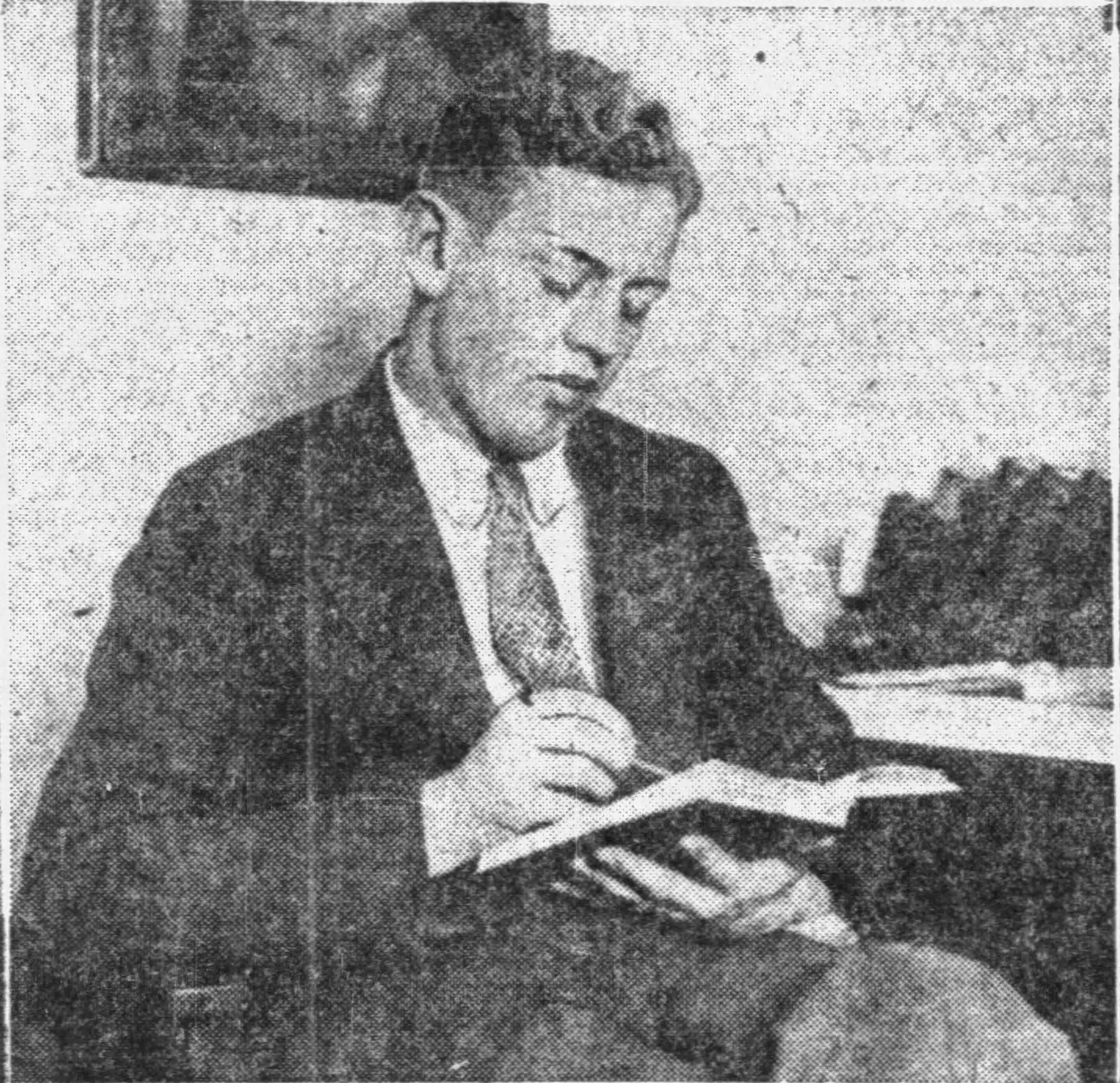
- Lowry in 1925

Profile
- Position: Center

Personal information
- Born: August 4, 1905; Chicago, Illinois, U.S.
- Died: February 27, 1983 (aged 77); Evanston, Illinois, U.S.

Career information
- College: Northwestern (1923–1925)

Awards and highlights
- First-team All-American (1925); Big Ten Most Valuable Player (1925); First-team All-Big Ten (1925)

Timothy G. Lowry (August 4, 1905 – February 27, 1983) was an American football center and lawyer. He played college football for the Northwestern Wildcats from 1923 to 1925 and won the Big Ten Most Valuable Player award in his senior year.

== Early life ==
Lowry was born in Chicago in 1905, the son of Charles D. Lowry, a district superintendent for the Chicago public school system. He attended Eugene Field grammar school and Nicholas Senn High School, graduating in 1922. He played high school football at the tackle and center positions for Senn.

== Northwestern ==
Lowry enrolled at Northwestern University in the fall of 1922 and played for the freshman football team. He played at the center position for the Northwestern Wildcats football teams from 1923 to 1925, captaining the team in his final season. At the conclusion of the 1925 college football season, he defeated Benny Friedman in voting for the Chicago Tribune Silver Football, the trophy presented to the most valuable player in the Big Ten Conference.

While at Northwestern, Lowry was also president of the senior class, captain of the wrestling team, a member of the Deru honorary senior society, a member of the dramatic club, and played bass. After receiving his undergraduate degree, he remained at Northwestern and attended the law school.

== Later life ==
Lowry had a career as a lawyer. He was also the secretary and treasurer of the Illinois Center Corporation at the time the Illinois Center. He was also an alderman in Evanston, Illinois. Lowry died in 1983 at age 77.
