= Harry Hawkins =

American athlete and engineer (1905–1977)

Profile
- Positions: Tackle, Guard

Personal information
- Born: July 11, 1905; Bay City, Michigan, U.S.
- Died: August 10, 1977 (aged 72)

Career information
- College: Michigan

Awards and highlights
- National champion (1923); First-team All-American (1925); First-team All-Big Ten (1925)

Henry Hawkins (July 11, 1905 – August 10, 1977) was an American athlete and engineer. He was a lineman for the University of Michigan football team from 1923-1925 where he was selected as a first-team All-American in 1925. Fielding H. Yost called him the "greatest lineman of the year." He was also the national champion in the hammer throw in 1926. Hawkins later had a successful career as an engineer in the automotive industry.

In 2019, the Saginaw Club established the Henry Hawkins award for the top football player in Saginaw County. The award is given based upon athletic, academic and community service accomplishments.

== University of Michigan athlete ==
=== Football player ===
A native of Saginaw, Michigan, Hawkins attended Arthur Hill High School. He enrolled at the University of Michigan in 1922 and played football for the Wolverines from 1923-1925. In the three seasons that Hawkins played for the Wolverines, the team had a combined record of 21-3 and outscored opponents 532 to 69.

As a sophomore in 1923, Hawkins was 6 feet tall, weighed 185 pounds, and started four games at right guard. In 1924, he started two games at right guard and three at right tackle.

As a senior in 1925, Hawkins had bulked up to 198 pounds and became one of the best linemen in the sport. He played for a 1925 Michigan team that included College Football Hall of Fame end Bennie Oosterbaan and quarterback Benny Friedman. The 1925 team finished the season with a 7-1 record, allowing only three points to be scored by opponents during the entire season. In the one game that the Wolverines gave up three points, they scored only two and lost 3-2 against Northwestern. Because of injuries to others on Michigan's line, Hawkins played five games at right tackle, three at left tackle, and also some at guard. After the 1925 season, sports writer Grantland Rice said of Hawkins: "Hawkins has been playing some at tackle, but guard is his natural position, and there are few better." Michigan Coach Fielding H. Yost called Hawkins the best lineman in the country:

"He declared the 1925 team was the greatest team he had ever coached. He called Harry Hawkins of Saginaw the 'greatest lineman of the year' and said he would be on all the all-American teams if he had played tackle all year."

He was named a first-team All-American by the Football Writers Association of America and a first-team All-Western tackle by sports writer Billy Evans and the Associated Press. He was selected as a third-team All-American by several selectors, including an Inter-Sectional Board of Football Coaches (including Tad Jones, Knute Rockne and Glenn "Pop" Warner), Chicago Tribune football writer Walter Eckersall, and Herbert Reed.

=== National champion hammer thrower ===
Hawkins also won varsity letters in track in his junior and senior years. In April 1916, Hawkins placed first in the weight triathlon (consisting of the hammer throw, shot put and discus throw) at the Kansas Relays carnival in Lawrence, Kansas. He was also the winner of the hammer throw even at the 1926 Penn relays and the 1926 Big Ten Conference outdoor track meet. At the Big Ten meet in May 1926, Hawkins' throw of 151 feet, 32-100 inches, was 14 feet farther than the second place thrower. Hawkins concluded his college career by winning the hammer throw at the national collegiate track and field championship in Chicago with a throw of 148 feet, and one-quarter inch—eleven feet farther than the second-place finisher.

=== Organizations and student politics ===
While at Michigan, Hawkins was the president of the senior class and vice president of the junior class. He was also a member of Kappa Sigma, Michigauma, Triangles, and Tau Beta Pi.

=== Later life ===
Hawkins graduated in 1926 with a degree in mechanical engineering and had a successful career in the automobile industry. In 1927, he married Ruth A. Goodwin, and they had two sons, Cordy and Harry. He was honored by the University of Michigan in 1957 for his "outstanding achievements and contributions to the development of the field of engineering."

== See also ==
- 1925 College Football All-America Team
- Michigan Wolverines Football All-Americans
