= Ferry Field =

American multi-purpose stadium

Coordinates: 42°16′7.5″N 83°44′30.4″W

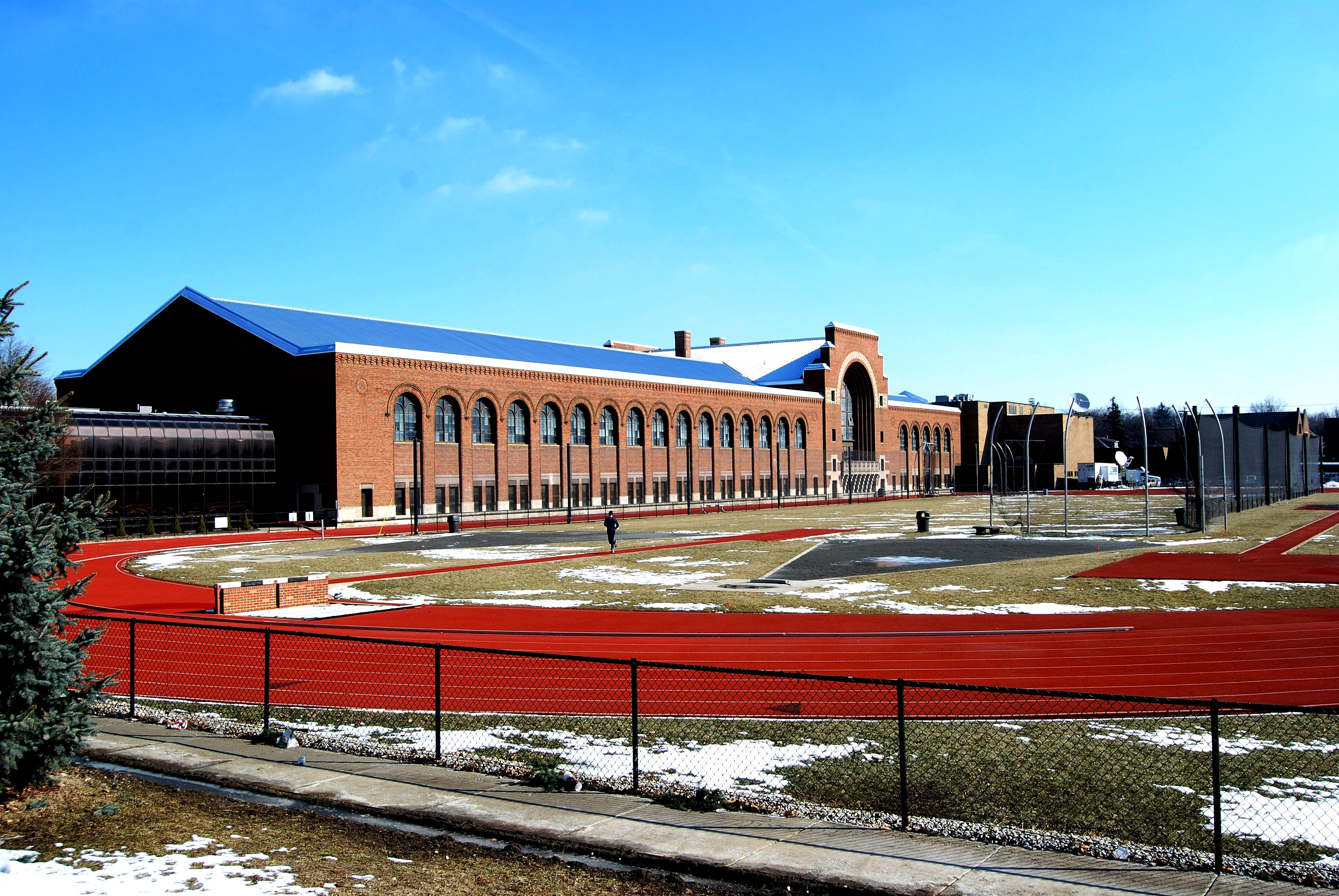
- Ferry Field, beside the Intramural Building, 2008
- Interactive map of Ferry Field
- Location: Ann Arbor, Michigan 48109
- Owner: University of Michigan
- Operator: University of Michigan
- Capacity: List: 18,000 (1906–13) 21,000 (1914–20) 42,000 (1921–25) 46,000 (1926–)
- Surface: Turf

Construction
- Groundbreaking: 1906
- Opened: October 6, 1906; 119 years ago
- Closed: 2018

Tenants
- Michigan Wolverines football (1906–1926); Michigan Wolverines track and field (former use)

Ferry Field was a multi-purpose stadium in Ann Arbor, Michigan. It opened in 1906 and was home to the Michigan Wolverines football team prior to the opening of Michigan Stadium in 1927. It had a capacity of 46,000. It is currently used as a tailgating space for football games.

After football moved to Michigan Stadium, Ferry Field was converted to an outdoor track and field facility and was still used for this purpose until 2018. In 1935, Ohio State sprinter Jesse Owens set world records in the 220 yard dash, the 200 meter dash, the 220 yard low hurdles, the 200 meter low hurdles, and the long jump, and tied the world record in the 100 yard dash, all within a 45-minute timespan. A bronze plaque at Ferry Field commemorates Owens' historic feat.

== Development ==
Michigan's football team became a major attraction after the success of coach Fielding H. Yost, and Regents Field with its 800-seat grandstand could not accommodate the paying crowds that sought to watch the team play. Michigan Athletic Director Charles A. Baird improved the university's athletic fields and "was responsible for the construction of Ferry Field to replace the outdated Regents Field." When Baird resigned as athletic director, one newspaper wrote: "Baird's greatest work for Michigan was planning and building Ferry field, which is the largest college athletic ground in the United States."

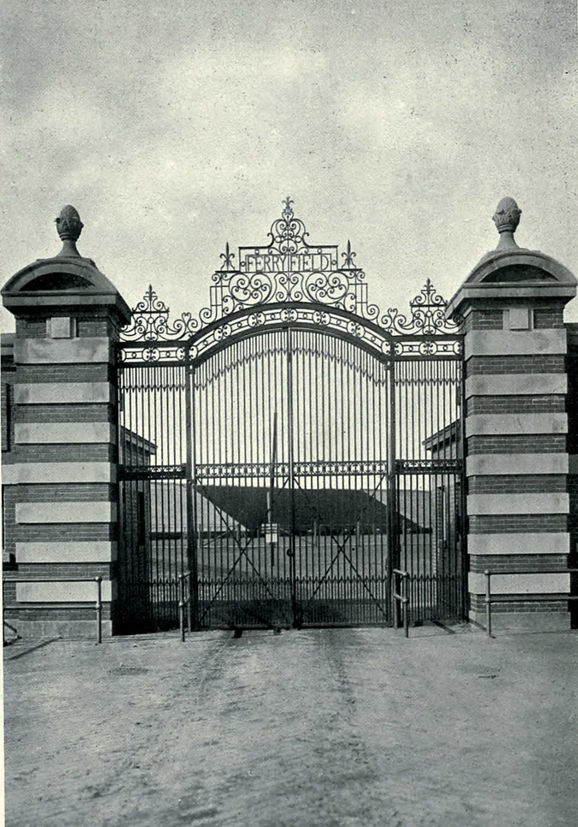
Ornamental gate designed by Albert Kahn Architects of Detroit, as seen in 1913

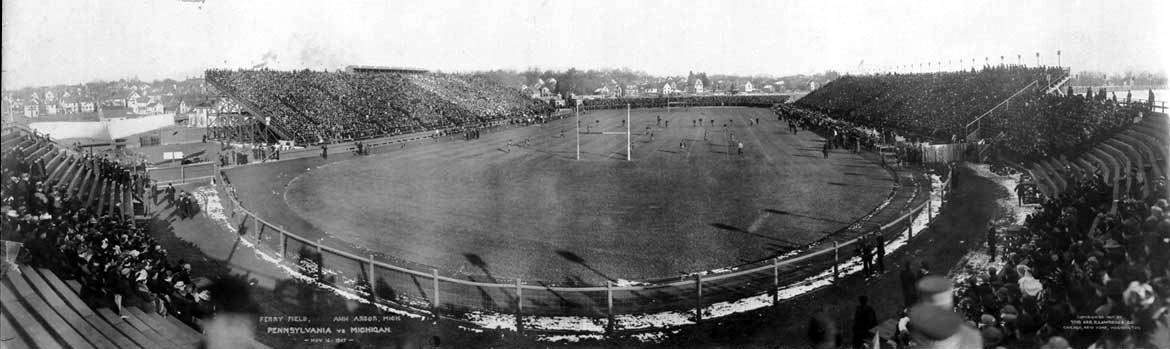
Michigan v Pennsylvania Nov 16, 1907

In 1902, Detroit businessman Dexter M. Ferry purchased and donated 20 acres (81,000 m^{2}) north of Regents Field for use in constructing a new athletic facility. Baird began by constructing new bleacher seating for 6,000 adjacent to the existing grandstand. One thousand circus seats were also installed. In November 1902, a Thanksgiving Day game against the University of Minnesota was held at Ferry Field with 10,000 spectators in attendance.

By 1906, the new Ferry Field with seating for 18,000 spectators was opened. The facility included a brick wall and ornamental gate with ten ticket windows. The gateway was designed by Albert Kahn Architects of Detroit and constructed at a cost of over $10,000. In the 1890s, a $3.00 membership granted students admission to all athletic events. By 1904, a general admission ticket for a big game cost as much as $3.00. With a seating capacity of 18,000, Baird's athletic department could generate $50,000 in revenue from a single game. When Ferry Field was completed, Baird expressed his pride in the facility:

Speaking of the field, Michigan today has the finest athletic grounds in the United States. With the completion of the operations we are making the total expenditure for permanent improvement of the field will cost $150,000. On it we have a gridiron for practice, another where the old field was, and the splendid new one, drained, leveled, sodded, surrounded by a concrete wall.

The last football game at Ferry Field was played in November 1926. The following year, the Michigan football team moved to Michigan Stadium.

== See also ==
- Regents Field
- Michigan Wolverines football
