= Benny Friedman =

American football player, coach, and athletic administrator (1905–1982)

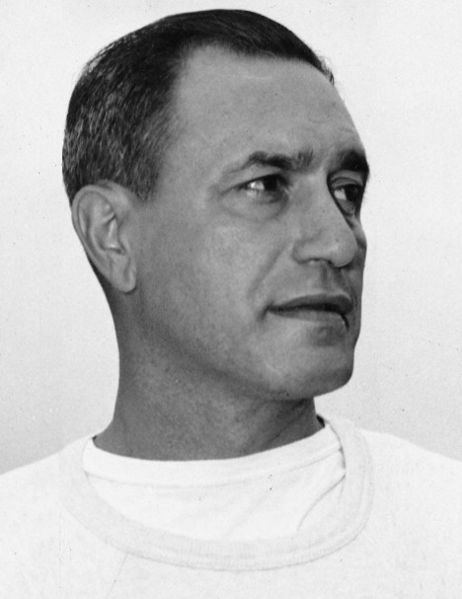
- Friedman in 1951

No. 6, 21, 1, 26
- Positions: Halfback, quarterback

Personal information
- Born: March 18, 1905; Cleveland, Ohio, U.S.
- Died: November 24, 1982 (aged 77); New York, New York, U.S.
- Listed height: 5 ft 10 in (1.78 m)
- Listed weight: 183 lb (83 kg)

Career information
- High school: Glenville (Cleveland)
- College: Michigan

Career history

Playing
- Cleveland Bulldogs (1927); Detroit Wolverines (1928); New York Giants (1929–1931); Brooklyn Dodgers (1932–1934)

Coaching
- New York Giants (1930) Head coach; Yale (1931) Backfield coach; Brooklyn Dodgers (1932) Head coach; CCNY (1934–1941) (Head coach); Great Lakes Navy (1942) Assistant coach; Brandeis (1950–1959) Head coach

Operations
- Brandeis (1949–1962) Athletic director

Awards and highlights
- 4× First-team All-Pro (1927–1930); Second-team All-Pro (1933); Third-team All-Pro (1931); 5× NFL passing yards leader (1927–1931); 4× NFL passing touchdowns leader (1927–1930); 4× NFL completion percentage leader (1927–1930); 4× NFL passer rating leader (1927–1930); NFL rushing yards leader (1928); NFL rushing touchdowns leader (1928); NFL scoring leader (1928); 36th greatest New York Giant of all-time; PFI all-time All-NFL team; 2× Consensus All-American (1925, 1926); Chicago Tribune Silver Football (1926); 2× First-team All-Big Ten (1925, 1926)

Career NFL statistics
- Passing attempts: 882
- Passing completions: 446
- Completion percentage: 50.6%
- TD–INT: 66–69
- Passing yards: 7,673
- Passer rating: 72.8
- Rushing yards: 2,322
- Rushing touchdowns: 18
- Stats at Pro Football Reference

Head coaching record
- Career: 5–9 (.357)
- Coaching profile at Pro Football Reference
- Pro Football Hall of Fame
- College Football Hall of Fame

Benjamin J. Friedman (March 18, 1905 – November 24, 1982) was an American football player and coach, and athletics administrator. He was the leading passer of his era in the NFL and is credited with revolutionizing the game with his passing prowess.

A native of Cleveland, Ohio, Friedman played college football as a halfback and quarterback for the Michigan Wolverines from 1924 to 1926. Friedman played in the backfield on both offense and defense, handled kicking and return duties, and was known for his passing game. He was a consensus first-team All-American in both 1925 and 1926, and won the Chicago Tribune Silver Football trophy as the most valuable player in the Big Ten Conference in 1926.

Friedman also played eight seasons in the National Football League (NFL) for the Cleveland Bulldogs (1927), Detroit Wolverines (1928), New York Giants (1929–1931), and Brooklyn Dodgers (1932–1934). He led the league in passing for four consecutive years from 1927 to 1930 and was selected as the first-team All-NFL quarterback in each of those years. In 1928, he also led the NFL in rushing and remains the only player in history to lead the league in both passing and rushing in the same season. In 1929, Friedman became the first player to pass for 20 touchdowns in a season and to pass for four touchdowns in a game. On October 15, 1933, he posted the first (Note: Minimum 10 pass attempts.) perfect passer rating in an NFL game. Friedman's career record of 66 touchdown passes stood for 10 years.

Friedman served as the head coach of the Giants for the final two games of the 1930 season, winning both. He was also the head coach of the Dodgers during the 1932 season. Friedman later served as the head football coach at City College of New York from 1934 to 1941 and at Brandeis University from 1950 to 1959. He was also the first athletic director at Brandeis, holding the position from 1949 to 1963. During World War II, he was a lieutenant in the United States Navy, serving as the deck officer aboard the aircraft carrier USS Shangri-La in the Pacific theater. He was part of the inaugural class of inductees into the College Football Hall of Fame in 1951 and was posthumously inducted into the Pro Football Hall of Fame in 2005.

== Early life ==
Benjamin J. Friedman was born March 18, 1905, in Cleveland, Ohio. His father, Louis Friedman, was a Jewish tailor and furrier who immigrated to the United States from the Russian Empire in 1890. His mother, Mayme (or Mamy) Atlevonik Friedman, was also a Russian Jew, who came to the United States in approximately 1894. His parents had five children: Rebecca (born c. 1898 in New Jersey); Harry (born c. 1900 in New York); Florence (born c. 1904 in New York); Benjamin; and Sydney (born c. 1908 in Ohio).

Friedman began his high school education at East Technical High School in Cleveland. Sam Willaman, the school's football coach, told Friedman, who was then five feet, six inches, and less than 150 pounds, that, due to his small size, he would never make it as a football player. After being rejected by Willaman, Friedman transferred to Glenville High School on the east side of Cleveland. He played football, baseball and basketball and led Glenville's football team to the city championship in 1922.

== College career ==
Friedman enrolled at the University of Michigan in 1923. He played on the all-freshman football team in the fall of 1923.

=== 1924 season ===
As a sophomore for the 1924 Michigan Wolverines football team, Friedman began the season as a backup. However, after an embarrassing 39–14 loss to Red Grange's Illinois Fighting Illini, head coach George Little made several changes to Michigan's lineup, including inserting Friedman as a starter at right halfback. Friedman remained at the right halfback position for the final five games of the season, and the Wolverines compiled a 4–1 record in those games. According to one account, "Friedman immediately changed Michigan from an ordinary football team into a great one."

On October 25, 1925, in his first collegiate start, Friedman helped Michigan defeat the Wisconsin Badgers, 21–0. The New York Times noted that Michigan had found "a new and dazzling gridiron meteor". Friedman was responsible for all three Michigan touchdowns. In the second quarter, he completed a "perfect pass spiraling" to Herb Steger for a 35-yard gain and Michigan's first points. In the third quarter, Friedman broke through Wisconsin's left tackle and ran 26 yards for a touchdown. In the fourth quarter, he threw a 29-yard pass to Charles Grube who was tackled at the seven-yard line, setting up a touchdown run by Dutch Marion.

Two weeks later, Friedman threw three touchdown passes in a 27–0 victory over the Northwestern Wildcats. One of Michigan's touchdowns was set up when Friedman intercepted a Northwestern pass and returned it 13 yards. On the next play, Friedman threw a touchdown pass to Dutch Marion.

At the end of the 1924 season, Friedman was the subject of a feature story by syndicated sports writer Billy Evans. Evans described Friedman's soft passing touch: "Michigan receivers say that Friedman's passes float through the air like a feather, literally float in the air until you pluck the ball out of the ozone."

=== 1925 season ===
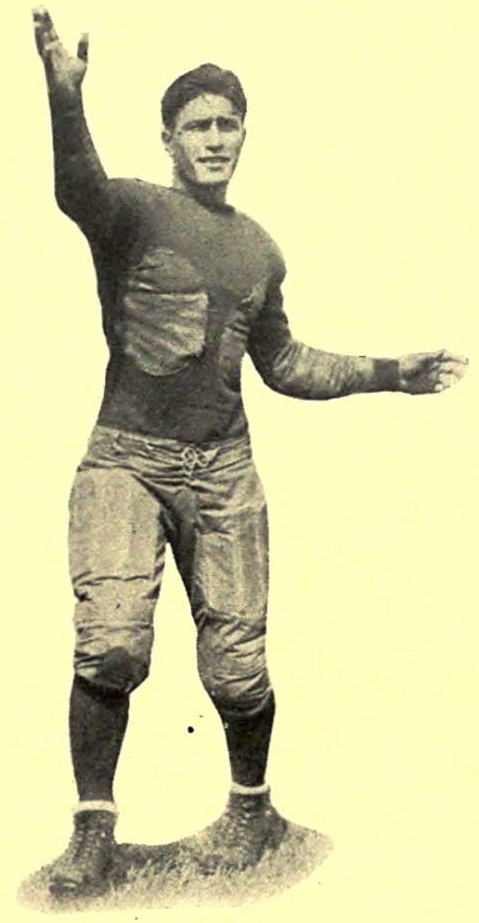
Friedman at Michigan

As a junior, Friedman moved to the quarterback position and started all eight games. He led the 1925 Michigan team to a 7–1 record and a Big Ten Conference championship, as the Wolverines outscored opponents by a combined score of 227 to 3. The only points allowed by the team were in a 3–2 loss to the Northwestern Wildcats in a game played in a heavy rainstorm on a field covered in mud five or six inches deep in some places. At the end of the season, Michigan coach Fielding H. Yost called the 1925 Michigan team "the greatest football team I ever coached" and "the greatest football team I ever saw in action."

In the season opener, a 39–0 victory over Michigan State Spartans, Friedman scored the first touchdown on a 65-yard run. Later in the half, Friedman completed a pass to Charles Grube for a 20-yard gain and then completed another pass to Bruce Gregory for a 30-yard gain and a touchdown. In the second half, Friedman intercepted a pass and then completed a pass to Bennie Oosterbaan for a 24-yard gain and a touchdown. In the second game of the season, Friedman led Michigan to a 63–0 victory over the Indiana Hoosiers. Friedman accounted for 50 points, throwing five touchdown passes, running 55 yards for a touchdown, and kicking two field goals and eight extra points.

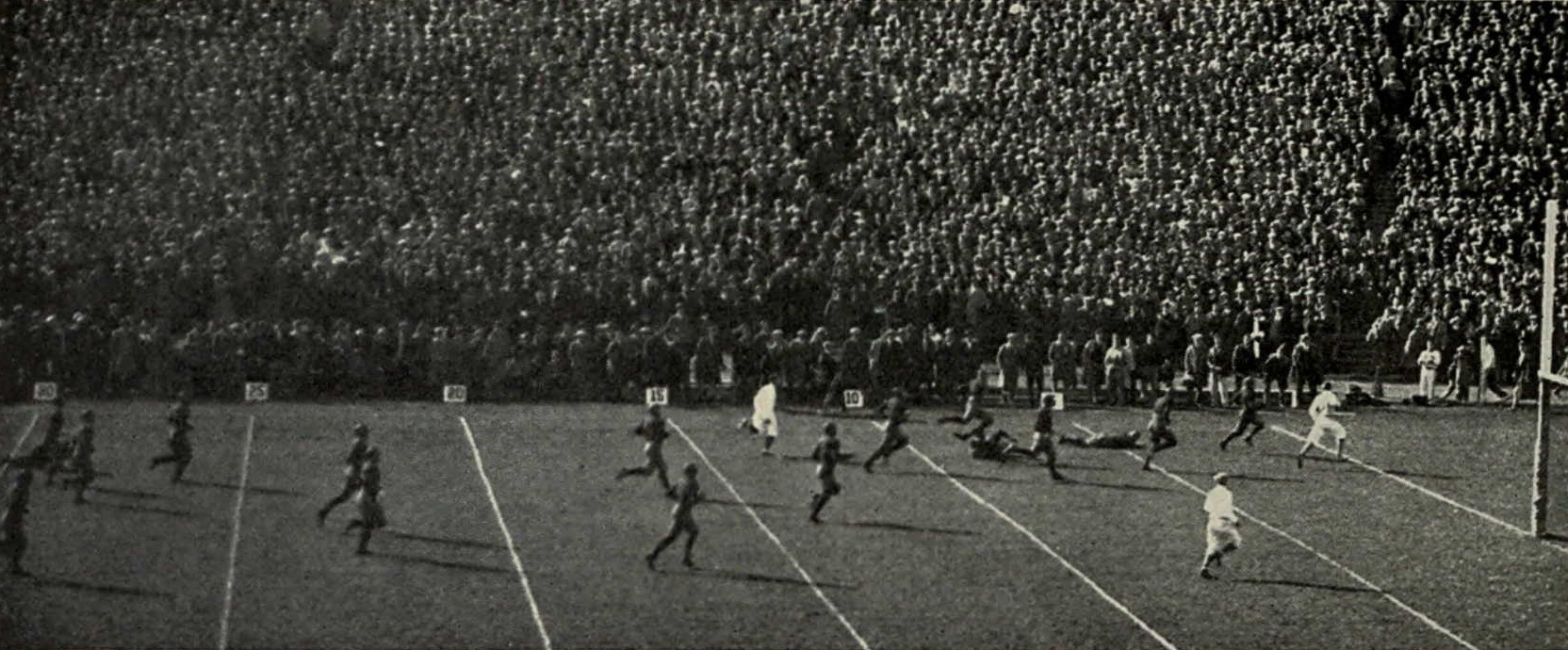
Friedman's 85-yard kickoff return against Wisconsin.

In Michigan's third game, a 21–0 victory over Wisconsin Badgers, Friedman threw a pass to Gregory for a 62-yard gain and a touchdown. Following the touchdown, Wisconsin kicked off, and Friedman returned the kickoff 85 yards for a touchdown. Friedman converted both extra points, and Michigan led, 14–0, after the first three plays. The AP noted: "It took just thirty-one seconds for Michigan to win the game at Madison and show the football world that Benny Friedman is destined for top rank among the great players developed by Yost."

On October 31, Friedman threw two touchdown passes in a 54–0 victory over the Navy Midshipman. Friedman also kicked five extra points in the game. Writing in the Chicago Daily Tribune, James Crusinberry wrote: "If any one man stood out, it was Benny Friedman, who hurled forward passes with accuracy and abandon time after time. . . . Besides that, Benny was a regular whirligig in carrying the ball. And it was Benny who was the field general. His selections of plays was something that would make any general envious." Crusinberry later added: "And now we have Mr. Yost's new Michigan team, with not a Grange on it, but with one of the brainiest players of the age in Benny Friedman and a lot of smart fellows to work with him. Before Benny Friedman ends his career all the teams of the country, even the Navy, will have abandoned the old style football and will be using, or at least trying to use, smart and unexpected stuff. It gains ground, it is spectacular, and it wins."

In the final game of the season, Friedman led Michigan to a 35–0 victory over the Minnesota Golden Gophers for the Wolverines' seventh shutout in eight games. Friedman threw two touchdown passes to Oosterbaan, completed seven of 16 pass attempts for 130 yards, and converted all five extra-point kicks.

Historic data collected by the NCAA indicates that Friedman completed 34 of 83 passes during the 1925 season with 13 touchdown passes and eight interceptions. Friedman and Oosterbaan were both selected as consensus first-team All-Americans, with Friedman becoming the first Michigan quarterback to earn All-America honors. The passing combination of Friedman and Oosterbaan, which became known as "The Benny-To-Bennie Show", is considered "one of the greatest passing combinations in college football history."

=== 1926 season ===
At the close of the 1925 season, Friedman was elected by his teammates to serve as the captain of the 1926 Michigan team. As captain, Friedman started seven of eight games at quarterback and led the 1926 team to a 7–1 record and a tie for the Big Ten Conference championship. The team's only loss was to the national champion Navy Midshipmen.

Friedman was a triple-threat man for the 1926 team. In addition to passing, he handled kicking duties, returned punts, caught passes, and played in the backfield on both offense and defense. Much like Hank Greenberg in the 1930s, Friedman's success in the 1920s was a source of pride for Jews across the United States. In November 1926, at a ceremony before Michigan's game in Baltimore against Navy, "The Jewish Times" presented Friedman with a statue of himself running down the field.

At the end of the season, Friedman was a consensus All-American for the second consecutive year. He received first-team honors from the Associated Press, based on polling of "more than 100 coaches and critics" Collier's Weekly as selected by Grantland Rice with cooperation from ten leading coaches, the International News Service, the Newspaper Enterprise Association, the Central Press Association, based on a poll conducted by Norman Brown of 500 newspapers, each of which conducted its own election in which fans voted for the All-American team; Central Press reported compiling a million votes. New York Sun and Walter Eckersall. He also received the Chicago Tribune Silver Football trophy as the most valuable player in the Big Ten Conference.

== Professional career ==
=== Cleveland Bulldogs ===
In August 1927, Friedman announced that he would play professional football for the Cleveland Bulldogs in the National Football League (NFL). During the 1927 season, Friedman started all 13 games at quarterback and led Cleveland to an 8–4–1 record. Cleveland had the top scoring offense in the league with an average of 16.1 points per game. In his first NFL game, he threw a 50-yard touchdown pass to Al Bloodgood. He led the NFL during the 1927 with 12 passing touchdowns and 1,721+ passing yards; his closest competitors totaled seven passing touchdowns and 1,362 passing yards. He was selected as a first-team All-NFL player by both the Chicago Tribune and the Green Bay Press Gazette.

=== Detroit Wolverines ===
In 1928, the Cleveland NFL franchise moved to Detroit and became known as the Detroit Wolverines. Friedman started all 10 games for the Wolverines and led the club to a 7–2–1 record. With Friedman at the helm, Detroit also had the top-scoring offense in the league with an average of 18.9 points scored per game. For the second straight season, he led the NFL with 10 passing touchdowns (double the next highest total) and 1,120+ yards, and was again selected as a first-team All-NFL player by both the Chicago Tribune and the Green Bay Press Gazette. Friedman also led the NFL in rushing touchdowns in 1928, making him the only player in NFL history to lead the league in both passing and rushing touchdowns in the same season.

=== New York Giants ===
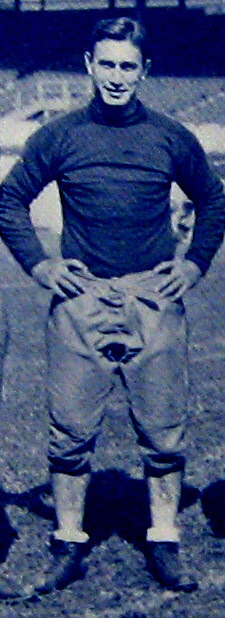
Friedman with the Giants, 1929

In July 1929, Friedman signed with the New York Giants. In his first year in New York, Friedman appeared in all 15 games and led the Giants to a 13–1–1 record, second best in the NFL. The Giants also had the top scoring offense in the league with an average of 20.8 points per game. Friedman led the NFL with 985 passing yards, and his 20 touchdown passes set an NFL single season record that stood until 1942. After the final game of the 1929 season, one sports writer noted: "The uncanny field generalship of Friedman, combined with his bullet passes, was a big factor in the Giants' thirteenth and last victory of the season."

In 1930, Friedman had another strong season, appearing in 15 games for the Giants and helping the team to a 13–4 record. The Giants again finished in second place in the NFL and had the top scoring offense in the league with 18.1 points scored per game. Friedman led the NFL with 922 passing yards and 10 touchdown passes in 1930. For the fourth consecutive season, Friedman was selected as a first-team All-NFL player.

Friedman's passing proficiency was especially noteworthy considering that the football used at the time was rounder and more difficult to throw. Friedman called plays at the line of scrimmage and threw on first and second down, when most teams waited until third down. "Benny revolutionized football. He forced the defenses out of the dark ages." George Halas later said.

In February 1931, Friedman announced that he intended to retire from professional football. He was hired as an assistant coach for the Yale Bulldogs football team. On October 26, 1931, Friedman signed a contract to return to the Giants for the remainder of the season. Since the Giants' practices were held in the morning, Friedman indicated that his duties with the Giants would not conflict with his coaching duties at Yale. Friedman appeared in nine games for the 1931 Giants.

=== Brooklyn Dodgers ===
In March 1932, Friedman signed as player and coach for the Brooklyn Dodgers. The Dodgers compiled a 3–9 record for the season.

Friedman signed to return to the Dodgers as a player in September 1933, though he did not serve as the head coach in 1933. He started five of ten games for team that year. His average of 84.9 passing yards per game led the NFL for the 1933 season.

In 1934, Friedman appeared in only one NFL game.

=== Career accomplishments ===
In his eight seasons in the NFL, statistics are incomplete, but he appeared in 81 games, compiled at least 5,326 passing yards, and had 66 touchdown passes and 51 passes intercepted. He was the NFL's career leader in passing yardage until Sammy Baugh's seventh NFL season in 1947. Friedman also totaled over 1,000 yards rushing and over 400 yards on punt returns. At the time of his retirement, Friedman also held the NFL record with 66 career touchdown passes.

== Coaching career and military service ==
=== City College of New York ===
In February 1934, Friedman was hired as the football coach at City College of New York. He remained the coach at City College through the 1941 season, stepping down in 1942 for military service. Friedman's City College teams compiled a composite record of 27–31–4.

=== Military service ===
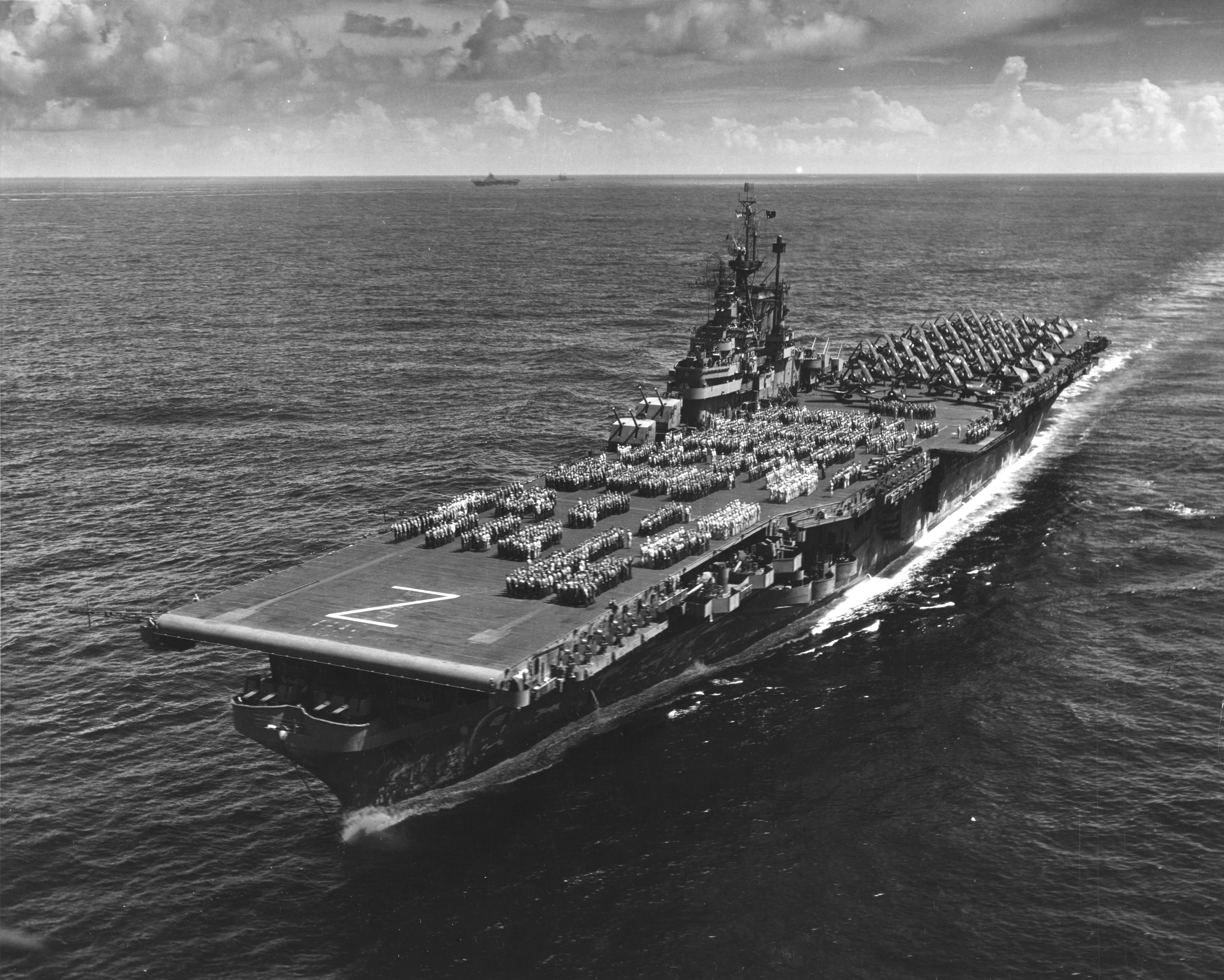
USS Shangri-La in 1946

In the summer of 1942, Friedman enlisted in the United States Navy with the rank of lieutenant. He was named an assistant football coach at the Great Lakes Naval Training Station in North Chicago, Illinois. He later served as the deck officer aboard the aircraft carrier USS Shangri-La in the Pacific Ocean theater of World War II.

After being discharged, he went into the automobile sales business. He operated a Jeep dealership in Detroit.

=== Brandeis University ===
In June 1949, Friedman was hired as the athletic director at Brandeis University, a university founded in 1948 at Waltham, Massachusetts. He was also the school's first coach of the Brandeis football team when it began play in 1950. He remained the head football coach at Brandeis through the 1959 season. Despite the limited enrollment, the first years of the football program were incredibly successful, winning their first game against the prestigious Harvard freshman team. In the following years Friedman's Judges posted a winning record in their first varsity season as well as going 6–1 in 1957, the team's best record. Friedman's run as head coach of the Judges was filled with years of struggles to attract high end talent. Additionally, players at Brandeis were required to maintain certain academic standards that made it challenging for Friedman to recruit. Despite this, in 10 years as head coach, Friedman's Brandeis football teams compiled a winning record of 38–35–4.

In 1960, Brandeis discontinued its football program, noting that "the per capita cost of fielding a varsity football team is inordinately high in relation to other varsity and intramural sports." Despite the end of the football program, Friedman remained as the athletic director at Brandeis until April 1963 when he resigned his post.

== Career statistics ==
=== NFL ===
Legend
	Led the league
**Bold**	Career high
Underline	Incomplete data

Regular season

Year	Team	GP	GS	Passing											Rushing				Kicking		Punting			Scoring
Year	Team	GP	GS	Cmp	Att	Cmp%	Yds	TD	TD%	Int	Int%	Y/A	Y/C	Rtg	Att	Yds	TD	Y/A	FGM	XPM	Pnt	Yds	Y/P	Pts
1927	CLE	13	13	**95**	**205**	46.3	**1,721**	11	5.4	11	5.4	8.4	18.1	71.2	22	158	2	**7.2**	0	11	9	**334**	37.1	23
1928	DET	10	10	77	155	49.7	1,348	9	5.8	**15**	9.7	8.7	17.5	59.5	87	**575**	**6**	6.6	0	19	1	44	44.0	**55**
1929	NYG	15	14	91	163	55.8	1,700	**20**	**12.3**	11	6.7	10.4	**18.7**	**103.5**	76	422	2	5.6	0	**20**	—	—	—	32
1930	NYG	15	13	71	124	57.3	1,246	13	10.5	9	7.3	10.0	17.5	96.4	**90**	386	**6**	4.3	**1**	10	1	50	**50.0**	49
1931	NYG	9	5	42	68	**61.8**	729	3	4.4	4	5.9	**10.7**	17.4	88.4	66	323	2	4.9	—	—	2	56	28.0	12
1932	BKN	11	10	23	74	31.1	319	5	6.8	10	13.5	4.3	13.9	28.9	88	250	0	2.8	**1**	5	**10**	315	31.5	8
1933	BKN	7	5	42	80	52.5	594	5	6.3	7	8.8	7.4	14.1	61.1	55	177	0	3.2	0	6	—	—	—	6
1934	BKN	1	1	5	13	38.5	16	0	0.0	2	**15.4**	1.2	3.2	7.1	9	31	0	3.4	—	—	—	—	—	—
Career		81	71	446	882	50.6	7,673	66	7.5	69	7.8	8.7	17.2	72.8	493	2,322	18	4.7	2	71	23	799	34.7	185

== Halls of Fame and other honors ==
Friedman was selected by sportswriter George Trevor as a first-team All-American on his 1920s All-Decade Team, published in the November 1, 1929, edition of the Technique. In the 1930 edition of Illustrated Football Annual, Big Bill Edwards named Friedman to his 11-player all-time All-American team. When the College Football Hall of Fame was established in 1951, Friedman was part of the inaugural group of 32 players and 21 coaches to be inducted.

Friedman also received acclaim for his professional football career. Sports writer Paul Gallico called Friedman "the greatest football player in the world." Wellington Mara, the owner of the New York Giants, said of Friedman, "He was the Johnny Unitas of his day. He was the best of his time." George Halas gave Friedman credit for revolutionizing the game with his passing and wrote an article in 1967 titled "Halas Calls Friedman Pioneer Passer – Rest Came By Design."

In 1947, Pro Football Illustrated named Friedman to its all-time All-NFL team. However, when the Pro Football Hall of Fame was established in 1963, Friedman was overlooked. As years passed, numerous quarterbacks were inducted, including Sammy Baugh (1963), Dutch Clark (1963), Jimmy Conzelman (1964), Paddy Driscoll (1965), Otto Graham (1965), Sid Luckman (1965), Bob Waterfield (1965), Arnie Herber (1966), Bobby Layne (1967), Y. A. Tittle (1971), Norm Van Brocklin (1971), and Ace Parker (1972). Friedman's frustration grew as he continued to be overlooked. In February 1976, more than 40 years after his NFL career had ended, he wrote a letter to The New York Times pleading his case. It was not until 2005, 23 years after his death, that Friedman was finally inducted into the Pro Football Hall of Fame. A group of 40 to 50 players who played for him at Brandeis printed brochures and lobbied for his induction. He was then nominated by the Hall's veterans committee and received the requisite votes by a 39-member panel of selectors.

In 2018, Bleacher Report ranked Friedman as the 12th greatest Jewish athlete of all time.

Friedman has received numerous other honors, including the following:

- In 1961, he was inducted into the Michigan Sports Hall of Fame.
- In 1976, Friedman was inducted, as part of the inaugural class of inductees, into the Greater Cleveland Sports Hall of Fame.
- In 1979, Friedman was inducted into the International Jewish Sports Hall of Fame.
- In 1980, Friedman was inducted into the University of Michigan Athletic Hall of Honor. He was the first quarterback and the seventh football player (behind Tom Harmon, Gerald Ford, Ron Kramer, Bennie Oosterbaan, Willie Heston, and Germany Schulz) to be inducted into the Hall of Honor.
- In 1993, he was inducted into the Brandeis Athletics Hall of Fame as a contributor.
- In 2004, he was inducted into the National Jewish Sports Hall of Fame.
- In 2026, he was inducted, as part of the posthumous class of inductees, into the Ohio Sports Hall of Fame.

== Family and later years ==
Friedman was married in February 1931 to Shirley Immerman, a resident of Brooklyn. The wedding was held at a Long Island country club with Guy Lombardo and his orchestra providing the entertainment. They were married for more than 50 years.

In 1949, Friedman became Brandeis University's first athletic director. He also served as head football coach until the school dropped the program. He went on sabbatical in September 1962 and resigned the following April, citing business pressures and the growth of his boys' quarterback school at Camp Kohut in Oxford, Maine. He sold the camp in 1969.

In his later years, Friedman suffered from multiple health problems. He battled and beat cancer, underwent back surgery, and suffered from heart disease and diabetes. In April 1979, Friedman developed a diffused clot of arteries in his left leg that resulted in gangrene. He underwent a partial amputation of his left leg below the knee.

In November 1982, he was found dead in his apartment in New York City as the result of a self-inflicted gunshot wound. He left a note indicating that he was "severely depressed". Friedman was survived by his wife, Shirley, a brother, and a sister.

== Head coaching record ==
=== NFL ===
Team	Year	Regular season					Postseason
Team	Year	Won	Lost	Ties	Win %	Finish	Result
NYG	1930	2	0	0	1.000	2nd in NFL	No playoffs
BKL	1932	3	9	0	.250	6th in NFL	Missed playoffs
Total		5	9	0	.357		

=== College ===
Year	Team	Overall	Conference	Standing	Bowl/playoffs
CCNY Beavers (Independent) (1934–1941)
1934	CCNY	4–3			
1935	CCNY	4–3			
1936	CCNY	4–4			
1937	CCNY	5–2			
1938	CCNY	4–3			
1939	CCNY	1–7			
1940	CCNY	1–5–1			
1941	CCNY	4–4			
CCNY:		27–31–1			
Brandeis Judges (Independent) (1950–1959)
1950	Brandeis	4–2			
1951	Brandeis	4–5			
1952	Brandeis	5–2–1			
1953	Brandeis	4–3			
1954	Brandeis	5–3			
1955	Brandeis	5–3			
1956	Brandeis	3–4–2			
1957	Brandeis	6–1			
1958	Brandeis	2–5			
1959	Brandeis	0–7–1			
Brandeis:		38–35–4			
Total:		65–66–5			

== See also ==
- History of the New York Giants (1925–1978)
- List of Michigan Wolverines football All-Americans
- List of select Jewish football players
