= Tod Rockwell =

American football player and coach (1900–1952)

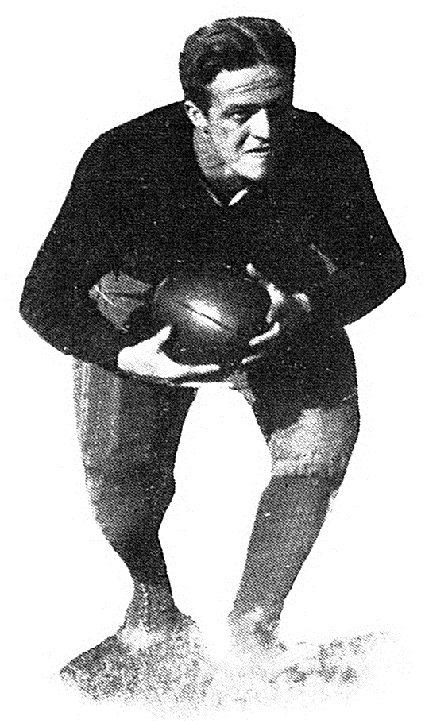

Biographical details
- Born: 1900; Chicago, Illinois, U.S.
- Died: March 22, 1952 (aged 52); Scott Field, Illinois, U.S.

Playing career
- 1923–1924: Michigan
- Position: Quarterback

Coaching career (HC unless noted)
- 1925: Salem
- 1926–1927: North Dakota
- 1928–1929: Louisiana Tech

Head coaching record
- Overall: 18–21–5

Ferdinand Almon "Tod" Rockwell (1900 – March 22, 1952) was an American college football player and coach. He attended the University of Michigan, where he played quarterback for the Wolverines football team in 1923 and 1924, helping the 1923 team win a national championship. Rockwell served as the head football coach at Salem College—now known as Salem University—in 1925, the University of North Dakota from 1926 to 1927, and Louisiana Polytechnic Institute—now known as Louisiana Tech University from 1928 to 1929.

== Early years ==
Rockwell was born in Chicago, the son of a Methodist minister. He attended high school in Jackson, Michigan.

== University of Michigan ==
Rockwell enrolled at the University of Michigan and played on the freshman football team in 1920. He did not play football in 1921 or 1922.

In 1923, Rockwell began the season as a backup quarterback, but he became the starter after Irwin Uteritz broke his ankle in a game against the Quantico Marines. When Rockwell came into the game against the Marines, Michigan lined up for a field goal with Rockwell holding the ball. As the Marines came through to block the kick, Rockwell jumped to his feet and ran the ball 26 yards for a touchdown. The touchdown run was Rockwell's first play for Michigan's varsity team. The following week, Rockwell again gained attention for a punt return against Wisconsin. The ball bounced off Rockwell's chest at the 25-yard line, but he picked up the loose ball. Rockwell was hit and appeared to be knocked down, but the whistle was not blown. Rockwell started a slow walk with the ball through a relaxed Badger team, which believed Rockwell had been ruled down. After reaching midfield, Rockwell began running at full speed and ran for Michigan's only touchdown in a 6 to 3 victory. Years later, Harry Kipke wrote about the play and described Rockwell's "perfect acrobatic somersault" as he appeared to be down but maintained his balance and ran for the winning touchdown.

The following week, Michigan faced Minnesota for the Western Conference championship, and Rockwell caught a pass from Michigan's fullback on his fingertips, juggled the ball, and ran 31 yards for a touchdown that led Michigan to a tie with Illinois for the conference championship. Rockwell's performance in the closing games of the 1923 season led sports writer Billy Evans to write: "Rockwell is one of the best open field runners in the Western Conference. He, more than any other man, saved the Big Ten title for Michigan."

After the 1923 season, another sport writer said of Rockwell: "Through the years Michigan has turned out a bunch of brilliant quarterbacks, 'Boss' Weeks, 'Shorty' McMillan, Tommy Hughitt and Uteritz but Rockwell gives promise of equaling the remarkable performance of all these former celebrities." The 1923 team finished the season with a perfect 8–0 record and has been recognized by Billingsley as the national champion of 1923.

In 1924, Rockwell started seven games at quarterback and one at halfback in leading the Wolverines to a 6–2 record, including wins over Michigan State (7–0), Wisconsin (21–0), Minnesota (13–0), Northwestern (27–0) and Ohio State (16–6). However, the Wolverines could not stop the Illinois team led by Red Grange, giving up 39 points to Michigan's 14. Rockwell was the second leading scorer in the Big Ten Conference in 1924 with 77 points on 10 touchdowns, 14 extra points and one field goal. Rockwell's scoring total was one point behind conference scoring leader Red Grange.

Rockwell received his degree from the University of Michigan as part of the first class to graduate from Michigan's new school of physical education and coaching.

== Coaching career ==
After graduating from Michigan, Rockwell coached for four years. His first position was in 1925 as athletic director and football coach at Salem College in Salem, West Virginia. In April 1926, he was hired as the new head football coach for the University of North Dakota. He held that position at North Dakota during the 1926 and 1927 season, compiling a record of 8–8. His third position was as head football coach at Louisiana Tech, where he had a record of 5–11–3 from 1928 to 1929.

== Later years ==
In 1930, Rockwell became a sports writer for the Detroit Free Press. He spent 10 years at the Free Press, writing about Michigan football, high school sports, yachting and Golden Gloves boxing.

Rockwell left the Free Press in 1940 to join the United States Navy construction forces, known as the Seabees. Rockwell remained in the Navy throughout World War II. After the war, he managed "Sports Final", a sports publication in Detroit. He later accepted a civilian public relations position for the United States Air Force. He also worked for a short time for the Michigan Department of Health.

Rockwell died on March 22, 1952.

== Head coaching record ==
Year	Team	Overall	Conference	Standing	Bowl/playoffs
Salem Tigers (West Virginia Athletic Conference) (1925)
1925	Salem	5–2–2	4–2–1	T–4th	
Salem:		5–2–2	4–2–1		
North Dakota Flickertails (North Central Conference) (1926–1927)
1926	North Dakota	4–4	3–2	5th	
1927	North Dakota	4–4	2–2	T–3rd	
North Dakota:		8–8	5–4		
Louisiana Tech Bulldogs (Southern Intercollegiate Athletic Association) (1928–1929)
1928	Louisiana Tech	2–7	1–6	27th	
1929	Louisiana Tech	3–4–3	1–3–2	T–22nd	
North Dakota:		5–11–3	2–9–2		
Total:		18–21–5			
