= 1924 Big Ten Conference football season =

- Sport: Football
- Number of teams: 10
- Champion: Chicago
- Season MVP: Red Grange

Football seasons
- ← 1923 1925 →

1924 Big Ten Conference football standings
	Conf.					Overall
Team	W		L		T	W		L		T
No. 11 Chicago $	3	–	0	–	3	4	–	1	–	3
No. 4 Illinois	3	–	1	–	1	6	–	1	–	1
No. 6 Iowa	3	–	1	–	1	6	–	1	–	1
Michigan	4	–	2	–	0	6	–	2	–	0
Purdue	2	–	2	–	0	5	–	2	–	0
Minnesota	1	–	2	–	1	3	–	3	–	2
Ohio State	1	–	3	–	2	2	–	3	–	3
Indiana	1	–	3	–	0	4	–	4	–	0
Northwestern	1	–	3	–	0	4	–	4	–	0
Wisconsin	0	–	2	–	2	2	–	3	–	3
$ – Conference champion; Rankings from Dickinson System

The 1924 Big Ten Conference football season was the 29th season of college football played by the member schools of the Big Ten Conference (also known as the Western Conference) and was a part of the 1924 college football season.

The Big Ten Conference champion for 1924 was Chicago which, in Amos Alonzo Stagg's 33rd year as head coach, compiled a 4–1–3 record (3–0–3 against Big Ten opponents) and outscored their opponents by a combined total of 88 to 40. Notable players on the 1924 Chicago team included guard Joe Pondelik and tackle Frank Gowdy. Pondelik was a consensus first-team All-American in 1924. Gowdy was selected as a first-team All-American by several selectors, including Football World, Liberty magazine, and All-Sports Magazine.

Red Grange of Illinois received the Chicago Tribune Silver Football trophy as the most valuable player in the conference.

== Season overview ==
=== Results and team statistics ===
Conf. Rank	Team	Head coach	Overall record	Conf. record	PPG	PAG
1	Chicago	Amos A. Stagg	4–1–3	3–0–3	11.0	5.0
2 (tie)	Illinois	Robert Zuppke	6–1–1	3–1–1	25.5	8.9
2 (tie)	Iowa	Burt Ingwersen	6–1–1	3–1–1	13.3	6.3
4	Michigan	Fielding H. Yost	6–2	4–2	19.4	6.8
5	Purdue	James Phelan	5–2	2–2	19.6	6.6
6	Minnesota	William H. Spaulding	3-3-2	1-2-1	8.5	7.9
7	Ohio State	John Wilce	2–3–3	1–3–2	5.0	5.6
8 (tie)	Indiana	Bill Ingram	4–4	1–3	18.4	12.5
8 (tie)	Northwestern	Glenn Thistlethwaite	4–4	1–3	13.6	8.3
10	Wisconsin	John J. Ryan	2–3–3	0–2–2	8.3	11.8

Key

PPG = Average of points scored per game
PAG = Average of points allowed per game

=== Bowl games ===
No Big Ten teams participated in any bowl games during the 1924 season.

== All-Big Ten players ==
Thirteen players received first-team honors on the 1924 All-Big Ten Conference football team from at least three of the following eight selectors: Billy Evans (BE), Bill Ingram (BI), Indiana head football coach, Daily Illini (DI), Hank Casserly (HC), sporting editor of the Capital Times in Madison, Wisconsin, The Indianapolis News (IN) Larry Dailey (LD), and Walter Eckersall (WE).

- Cookie Cunningham, end, Ohio State (BE, BI, DI, IN, LD)
- Lowell Otte, end, Iowa (BE, BI, HC, IN, WE)
- Franklin Gowdy, tackle, Chicago (BE, BI, DI, IN, LD, WE)
- John W. Hancock, tackle, Iowa (BE, HC, IN, LD)
- Ted Cox, tackle, Minnesota (BI, WE, DI, HC)
- Joe Pondelik, guard, Chicago (BE, BI, DI, HC, IN, LD, WE)
- George Abramson, guard, Minnesota (DI, IN, LD, WE)
- Edward Slaughter, guard, Michigan (BE, BI, HC)
- Ralph Claypool, center, Purdue (IN, DI, LD, WE)
- Leland Parkin, quarterback, Iowa (BE, BI, HC, IN, LD, WE)
- Ralph Baker, halfback, Northwestern (BE, DI, HC, IN, LD, WE)
- Red Grange, halfback, Illinois (BE, BI, DI, HC, IN, LD, WE)
- Cully Lidberg, fullback, Minnesota (BE, HC, LD)

== All-Americans ==
Two Big Ten players were consensus first-team picks on the 1924 College Football All-America Team. They were:

- Red Grange, halfback, Illinois
- Joe Pondelik, guard, Chicago
