= 1924 Michigan Wolverines football team =

American college football season

1924 Michigan Wolverines football
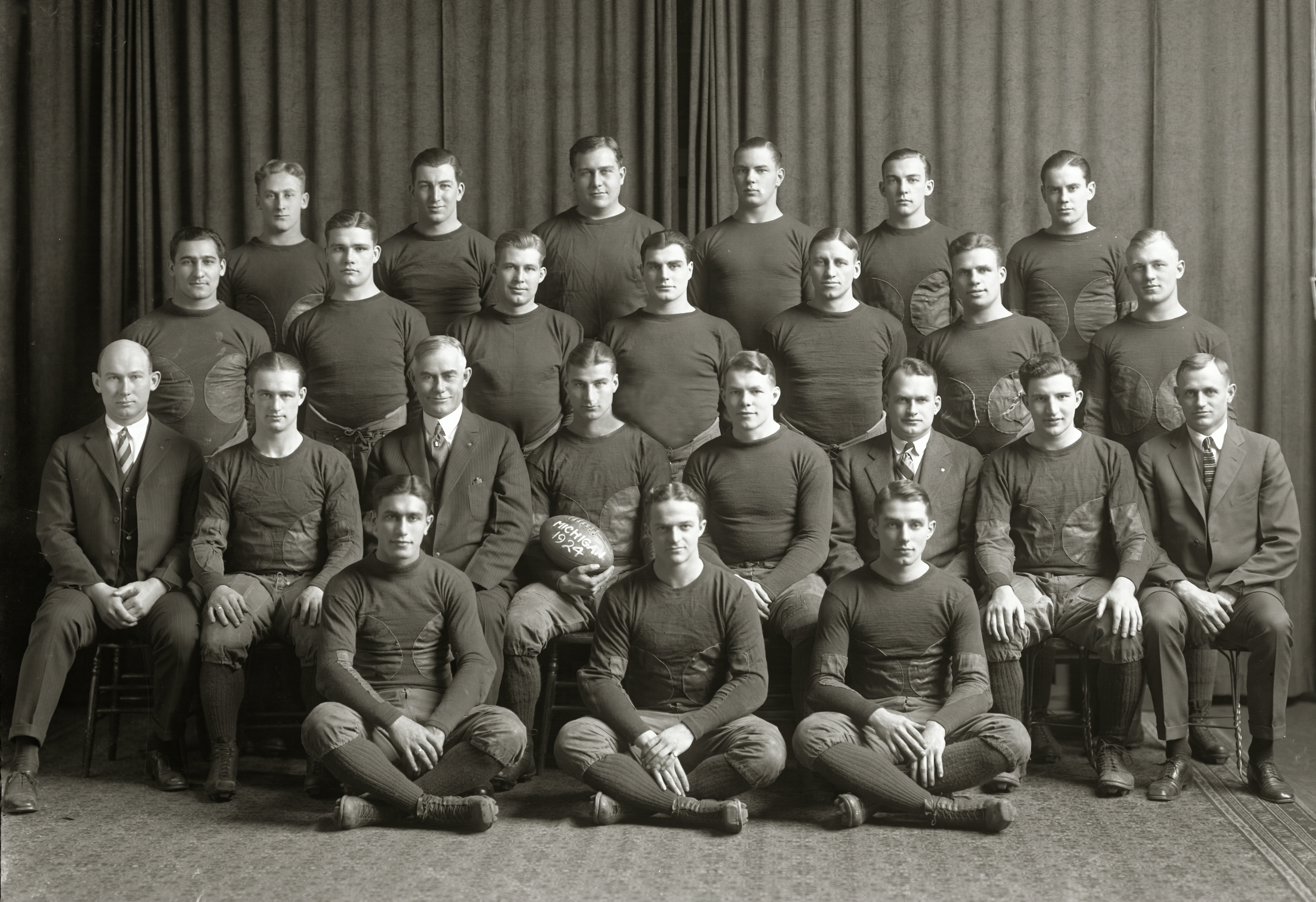
- Conference: Big Ten Conference
- Record: 6–2 (4–2 Big Ten)
- Head coach: George Little (1st season)
- Captain: Herb Steger
- Home stadium: Ferry Field

Uniform
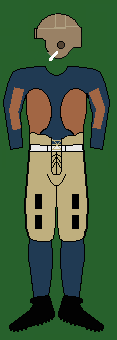

1924 Big Ten Conference football standings
	Conf.					Overall
Team	W		L		T	W		L		T
No. 11 Chicago $	3	–	0	–	3	4	–	1	–	3
No. 4 Illinois	3	–	1	–	1	6	–	1	–	1
No. 6 Iowa	3	–	1	–	1	6	–	1	–	1
Michigan	4	–	2	–	0	6	–	2	–	0
Purdue	2	–	2	–	0	5	–	2	–	0
Minnesota	1	–	2	–	1	3	–	3	–	2
Ohio State	1	–	3	–	2	2	–	3	–	3
Indiana	1	–	3	–	0	4	–	4	–	0
Northwestern	1	–	3	–	0	4	–	4	–	0
Wisconsin	0	–	2	–	2	2	–	3	–	3
$ – Conference champion; Rankings from Dickinson System

The 1924 Michigan Wolverines football team represented the University of Michigan in the 1924 Big Ten Conference football season. Coached by George Little in his first and only year as Michigan's head football coach, the team compiled a record of 6–2, outscored opponents 155–54, and finished in fourth place in the Big Ten Conference standings.

After starting the season with shutouts against Miami (55–0) and Michigan Agricultural (7–0), Michigan lost to Illinois (39–14), as Red Grange scored five touchdowns and gained 402 yards. After the loss to Illinois, Michigan rebounded with four consecutive victories over Big Ten opponents, before losing to Iowa in the final game of the season. In all eight games during the 1924 season, the Wolverines played before 340,000 spectators, reported to be "possibly a 1924 attendance record equaled by only Yale."

Halfback Herb Steger was the team captain, and left tackle Edliff Slaughter was selected as a first-team All-American. With 77 points, quarterback Tod Rockwell scored almost half of Michigan's 155 points and was the second-leading scorer in the Big Ten Conference, trailing Red Grange by one point. College Football Hall of Fame inductee Benny Friedman also made his debut as a starter for Michigan, playing at the halfback position in 1924.

== Schedule ==
Date	Opponent	Site	Result	Attendance	Source
October 4	Miami (OH)*	Ferry Field; Ann Arbor, MI	W 55–0	14,000	
October 11	at Michigan Agricultural*	College Field; East Lansing, MI (rivalry)	W 7–0	22,000	
October 18	at Illinois	Memorial Stadium; Champaign, IL (rivalry)	L 14–39	66,609	
October 25	Wisconsin	Ferry Field; Ann Arbor, MI	W 21–0	44,000	
November 1	at Minnesota	Memorial Stadium; Minneapolis, MN (Little Brown Jug)	W 13–0	45,000–50,000	
November 8	Northwestern	Ferry Field; Ann Arbor, MI (rivalry)	W 27–0	30,000	
November 15	at Ohio State	Ohio Stadium; Columbus, OH (rivalry)	W 16–6	70,000	
November 22	Iowa^{†}	Ferry Field; Ann Arbor, MI	L 2–9	47,000	
*Non-conference game; ^{†}Homecoming

== Game summaries ==
=== Miami (OH) ===
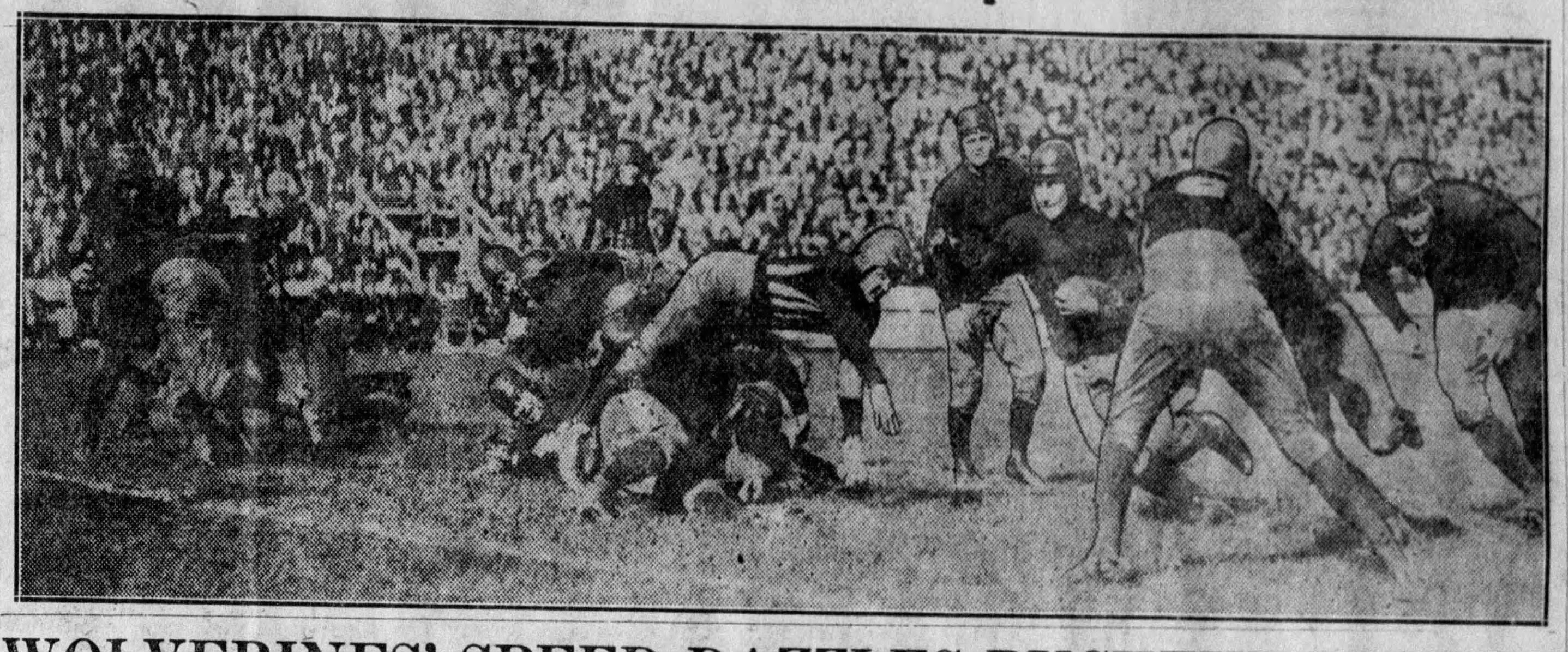
Herb Steger running the ball against Miami.

The season opened with a 55–0 defeat of the Miami Redskins.

=== At Michigan Agricultural ===
Michigan at Michigan Agricultural

Team	1	2	3	4	Total
• Michigan	0	0	0	7	7
Michigan Agricultural	0	0	0	0	0

- Date: October 11, 1924
- Location: College Field • East Lansing, MI

In the second game of the 1924 season, Michigan travelled to East Lansing to face the "Farmers" of Michigan Agricultural College. The game remained scoreless through the first three quarters. Michigan scored on a pass from halfback Frederick Parker to end Herb Steger to win the game by a 7–0 score. The 1925 Michiganensian described the play as follows: "In the last few minutes of play, Parker threw one of the long sensational passes that characterized the Wolverine's attack throughout the entire season, to Captain Steger who caught it and ran for a touchdown." According to The New York Times, Michigan center Robert J. Brown "was credited with an outstanding performance in the line."

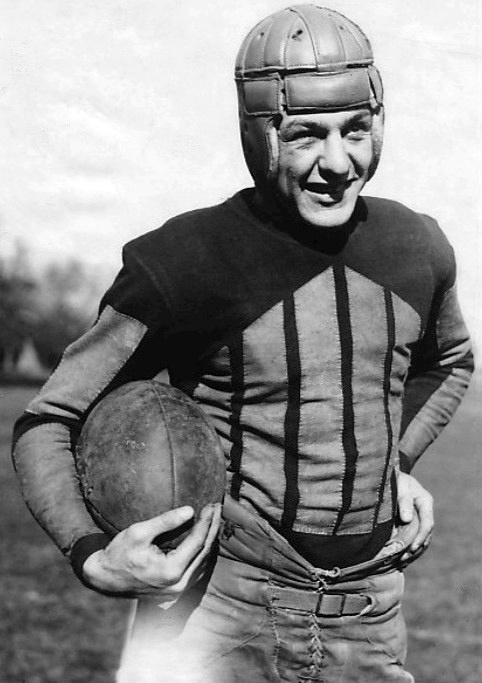
Grange in 1923

=== At Illinois ===
Michigan at Illinois

Team	1	2	3	4	Total
Michigan	0	7	0	7	14
• Illinois	27	0	6	6	39

- Date: October 18, 1924
- Location: Memorial Stadium • Champaign, IL
- Game attendance: 67,000
- Referee: C. J. Masker (Northwestern)

Michigan sustained its first loss of the season on October 18, 1924, losing to Illinois by a score of 39–14. Red Grange gained national notoriety for his performance in the game. Grange returned the opening kick-off 95 yards for a touchdown and scored four touchdowns in the first quarter to give Illinois a 27–0 lead. Grange scored five touchdowns in the game and gained 402 yards. The New York Times reported: "Unbiased experts agree that his performance was among the greatest ever seen on an American gridiron." Herb Steger ran for a Michigan touchdown in the second quarter. Tod Rockwell scored Michigan's final touchdown in the fourth quarter. Rockwell also kicked both of Michigan's extra points.

Michigan's lineup against Illinois was Dutch Marion (left end), George Babcock (left tackle), Edliff Slaughter (left guard), Robert J. Brown (center), Harold Steele (right guard), Harry Hawkins (right tackle), Charles Grube (right end), Tod Rockwell (quarterback), Herb Steger (left halfback), Frederick Parker (right halfback), and James Miller (fullback).

=== Wisconsin ===
Wisconsin at Michigan

Team	1	2	3	4	Total
Wisconsin	0	0	0	0	0
• Michigan	0	7	7	7	21

- Date: October 25, 1924
- Location: Ferry Field • Ann Arbor, MI
- Game attendance: 45.000
- Referee: Hackett (West Point)

Following a defeat against Illinois, the Wolverines returned to Ann Arbor to play Wisconsin at Ferry Field. Michigan won the game by a score of 21–0. According to the 1925 Michiganensian, the team was "completely reorganized" after the loss to the Illini, with Herb Steger moving to quarterback, Ferdinand Rockwell to left halfback, James Miller to end, and "Dutch" Marion to fullback. The Michiganensian made particular note of newcomer Benny Friedman, starting at right halfback: "Michigan's running and passing game was at its best with Friedman, a new man doing the hurling and Captain Steger the receiving. A long pass from Friedman to Steger put the ball on the two-yard line." The New York Times also took note of Friedman's debut, noting that Michigan had found "a new and dazzling gridiron meteor" in his first game as a regular. Friedman was responsible for all three Michigan touchdowns. In the second quarter, Friedman completed a "perfect pass spiraling" to Herb Steger for a 35-yard gain and Michigan's first points. In the third quarter, Friedman broke through Wisconsin's left tackle and ran 26 yards for at touchdown. In the fourth quarter Friedman threw a 29-yard pass to Charles Grube who was tackled at the seven-yard-line. Fullback Dutch Marion then ran for the touchdown. Tod Rockwell converted all three extra point kicks for Michigan.

Michigan's starting lineup against Wisconsin was Miller (left end), Tom Edwards (left tackle), Edliff Slaughter (left guard), Robert J. Brown (center), Harry Hawkins (right guard), George Babcock (right tackle), William Flora (right end), Herb Steger (quarterback), Tod Rockwell (left halfback), Benny Friedman (right halfback), and Dutch Marion (fullback).

=== At Minnesota ===
Michigan at Minnesota

Team	1	2	3	4	Total
• Michigan	6	7	0	0	13
Minnesota	0	0	0	0	0

- Date: November 1, 1924
- Location: Memorial Stadium • Minneapolis, MN
- Game attendance: 45,000
- Referee: Masker (Northwestern)

For its fifth game, Michigan travelled to Minneapolis to face the Minnesota Golden Gophers in the first Big Ten Conference game played in the new horseshoe-shaped Memorial Stadium. Michigan recovered a fumble in Minnesota territory, and William Herrnstein caught a 30-yard touchdown pass to give Michigan a 6–0 lead. In the second quarter, Michigan scored again, as Ferdinand Rockwell ran around the end for a touchdown on a faked field goal attempt. Rockwell also kicked the extra point, and Michigan won the game, 13–0.

Michigan's starting lineup against Minnesota was James Miller (left end), Tom Edwards (left tackle), Edliff Slaughter (left guard), Robert J. Brown (center), Harold Steele (right guard), George Babcock (right tackle), William Flora (right end), Tod Rockwell (quarterback), William Herrnstein (left halfback), Benny Friedman (right halfback), and Dutch Marion (fullback).

=== Northwestern ===
Northwestern at Michigan

Team	1	2	3	4	Total
Northwestern	0	0	0	0	0
• Michigan	6	14	7	0	27

- Date: November 8, 1924
- Location: Ferry Field • Ann Arbor, MI
- Game attendance: 30,000
- Referee: Hackett (West Point)

Michigan defeated Northwestern, 27–0, at Ferry Field on November 8, 1924. Benny Friedman threw three touchdown passes, and Ferdinand Rockwell scored three touchdowns and kicked three extra points. Michigan's first touchdown was scored by Rockwell on a 25-yard run off right tackle. Another touchdown was set up when Friedman intercepted a Northwestern pass and returned it 13 yards. On the next play, Friedman threw a touchdown pass to Dutch Marion. Also in the second quarter, Friedman threw a touchdown pass to Rockwell.

Michigan's starting lineup against Northwestern was James Miller (left end), Tom Edwards (left tackle), Edliff Slaughter (left guard), Robert J. Brown (center), Harold Steele (right guard), Walter Kunow (right tackle), William Flora (right end), Tod Rockwell (quarterback), William Herrnstein (left halfback), Benny Friedman (right halfback), and Dutch Marion (fullback).

=== At Ohio State ===
Michigan overcame a late 6–0 deficit to win, 16–6, against Ohio State. Edliff Slaughter scored a touchdown in the game.

=== Iowa ===
Iowa at Michigan

Team	1	2	3	4	Total
• Iowa	6	0	0	3	9
Michigan	2	0	0	0	2

- Date: November 22, 1924
- Location: Ferry Field • Ann Arbor, MI
- Referee: Masker (Northwestern)

In the final game of the season, Michigan lost to Iowa, 9–2, at Ferry Field. Michigan scored the first points of the game when an Iowa kick was blocked, and an Iowa player recovered the ball in the end zone. Iowa's fullback Scantlebury scored the only touchdown of the game on a one-yard run in the first quarter, but he missed the kick for extra point. Iowa led 6–2 at the end of the first quarter, and neither team was able to score in the second or third quarters. In the fourth quarter, Iowa drove to Michigan's 18-yard-line and settled for a field goal by right tackle Hancock for three points. According to the Associated Press account of the game, "Michigan carried the ball effectively through the Iowa line but could not gain within the twenty yard line."

Michigan's starting lineup against Iowa was Grube (left end), Tom Edwards (left tackle), Edliff Slaughter (left guard), Robert J. Brown (center), Harold Steele (right guard), Harry Hawkins (right tackle), William Flora (right end), Tod Rockwell (quarterback), Herb Steger (left halfback), Benny Friedman (right halfback), and Dutch Marion (fullback).

== Postseason ==
=== Individual awards and accomplishments ===
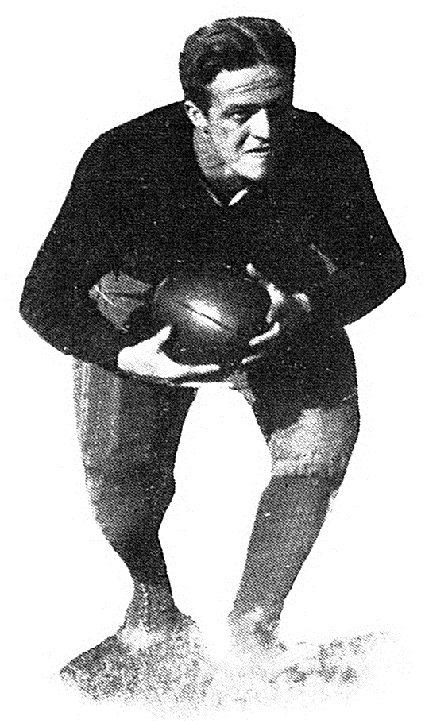
Tod Rockwell

After Michigan's victory over Ohio State, quarterback Tod Rockwell trailed Red Grange by only one point in the competition for the Big Ten Conference scoring championship. Through the first seven games of the season, Rockwell had ten touchdowns, one field goal and 14 extra points for a total of 77 points. Neither Rockwell nor Grange scored in the final games of the season, and Rockwell, with 77 points, finished second to Grange, with 78 points, for the conference scoring championship.

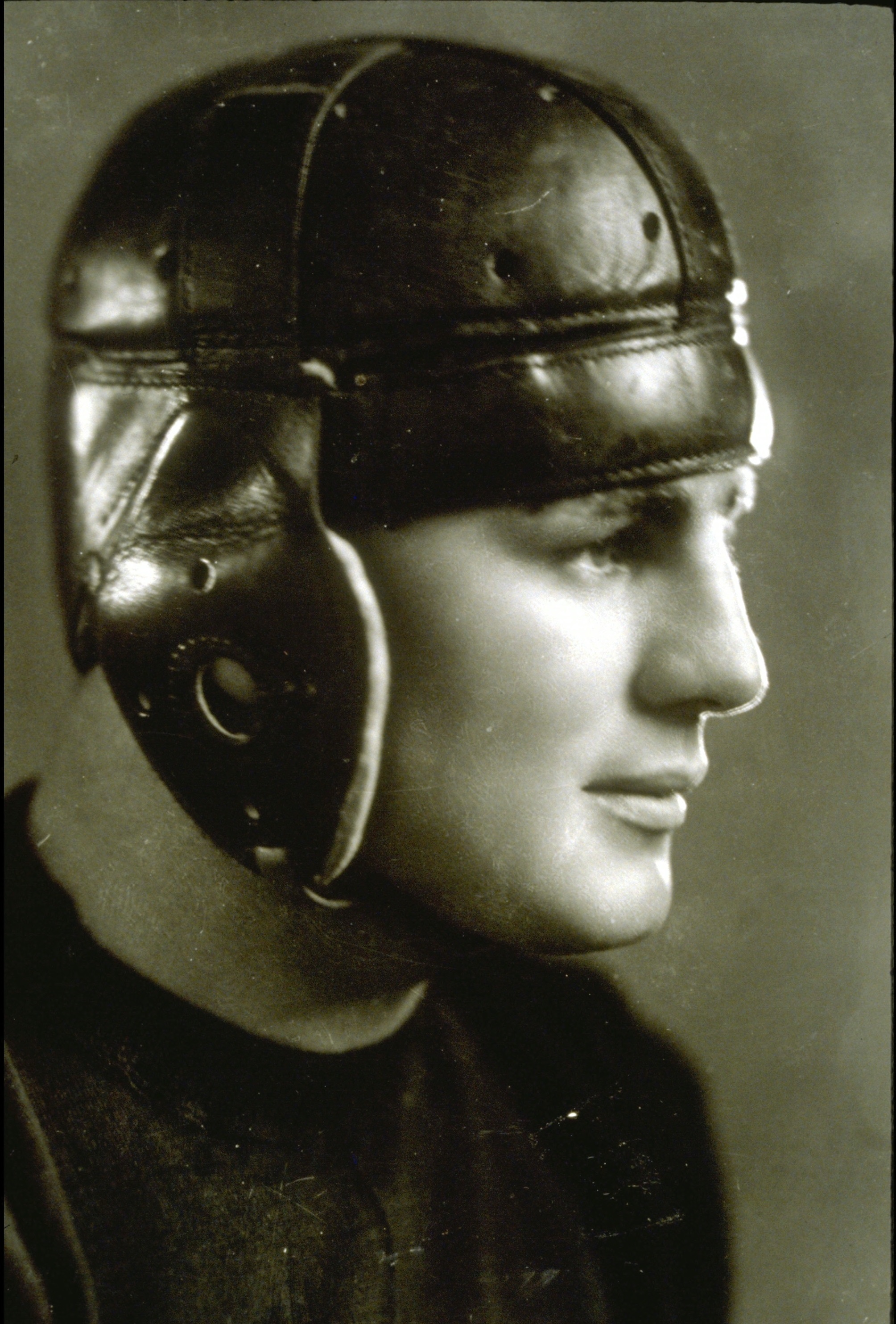
Edliff Slaughter

At the end of the 1924 season, Michigan's left tackle Edliff Slaughter was selected as a first-team All-American by Walter Camp for Collier's Weekly, Norman E. Brown, and Lawrence Perry. In announcing his choice of Slaughter as an All-American, Walter Camp wrote:

"Slaughter is a veteran guard who has always towered in any line of forwards. A big man, extremely active, he provides the pivotal spot upon which a line-plunging attack may rest. He carries his charge through so that he is never shoved back upon his runner. He is never guilty of 'knifing' through. Slaughter has unlimited endurance."

Sports columnist Norman E. Brown wrote, "Slaughter is one of the greatest defensive guards the Big Ten has had in recent years. . . . On offense Slaughter could be counted on not only to open up a hole but "carry through" with the play." Life magazine wrote 25 years later that Slaughter had been "famous and feared for vicious tackling at Michigan."

== Players ==
=== Varsity letter winners ===
- Richard George "Dick" Babcock, Royal Oak, Michigan - started 3 games at right tackle, 1 game at left tackle
- Robert J. Brown, Ypsilanti, Michigan - started 8 games at center
- Richard Sidney "Syd" Dewey, Monroe, MI - guard
- Victor "Vic" Domhoff, Toledo, OH - quarterback
- Thomas L. Edwards, Central Lake, Michigan - started 7 games at left tackle
- William R. Flora, Muskegon, Michigan - started 5 games at right end
- Benny Friedman, Cleveland, Ohio - started 5 games at right halfback
- Bruce R. Gregory, Ann Arbor, MI - halfback
- Charles W. Grube, Saginaw, Michigan - started 2 games at left end, 2 games at right end
- Harry Hawkins, Saginaw, MI - started 3 games at right tackle, 2 games at right guard
- William H. Herrnstein Jr., Chillicothe, Ohio - started 2 games at left halfback, 1 game at right halfback
- Walter Kunow, Detroit, Michigan - started 2 games at right tackle
- Edgar Madsen, Oak Park, Illinois - end (died during school year)
- Dutch Marion, Detroit, Michigan - started 5 games at fullback, 2 games at left end, 1 game at right end
- James K. Miller, Grand Rapids, Michigan - started 4 games at left end, 3 games at fullback
- H. Frederick Parker, Hasting, MI - halfback
- Ferdinand Rockwell, Jackson, Michigan - started 7 games at quarterback, 1 game at left halfback
- Edliff Slaughter, Louisville, Kentucky - started 7 games at left guard
- Carl P. Stamman, Toledo, Ohio - started 1 game at right halfback
- Harold O. Steele, Sioux City, Iowa - started 6 games at right guard
- Herb Steger, Oak Park, Illinois - started 5 games at left halfback, 1 game at quarterback

=== aMa letter winners ===
- Merle C. Baker, Kalamazoo, MI - back
- William D. Coventry, Duluth, Minnesota - center
- Russell W. Davis, Flint, MI - back
- Harlan Froemke, Sheldon, North Dakota - back
- William H. Heath, Corning, New York - back
- Elmer E. Langguth, Cleveland, Ohio - line
- John H. Lovette, Saginaw, MI - back
- Kent C. McIntyre, Detroit, MI - center
- Paul C. Samson, Ypsilanti, MI - tackle
- William E. Ullmann, Elmhurst, Illinois - end
- John H. Witherspoon, Detroit, MI - ?

=== Others ===
- Walter Weber, Mt. Clemens, MI - reserve back

== Awards and honors ==
- Captain: Herb Steger
- All-Americans: Edliff Slaughter (Walter Camp, 1st team; Lawrence Perry, 1st team; Billy Evans, 1st team; Norman E. Brown, 1st team); Tom Edwards (Lawrence Perry, 2nd team)

== Coaching staff ==
- Head coach: George Little (also assistant athletic director)
- Advisory coach: Fielding H. Yost
- Assistant coaches: Tad Wieman (line coach and assistant athletic director), Jack Blott (assistant instructor in football and baseball), Harvey Emery, Frank L. Hayes (assistant instructor in football and basketball), Edwin Mather (freshman football coach and varsity basketball coach), Ray Fisher (varsity baseball coach)
- Trainer: Charles B. Hoyt (freshman track coach and athletic trainer), William Fallon
- Manager: William B. Etheridge, Glenn Donaldson (assistant)
