= 1924 Minnesota Golden Gophers football team =

American college football season

1924 Minnesota Golden Gophers football
- Conference: Big Ten Conference
- Record: 3–3–2 (1–2–1 Big Ten)
- Head coach: William H. Spaulding (3rd season)
- Captain: Ted Cox
- Home stadium: Memorial Stadium

1924 Big Ten Conference football standings
	Conf.					Overall
Team	W		L		T	W		L		T
No. 11 Chicago $	3	–	0	–	3	4	–	1	–	3
No. 4 Illinois	3	–	1	–	1	6	–	1	–	1
No. 6 Iowa	3	–	1	–	1	6	–	1	–	1
Michigan	4	–	2	–	0	6	–	2	–	0
Purdue	2	–	2	–	0	5	–	2	–	0
Minnesota	1	–	2	–	1	3	–	3	–	2
Ohio State	1	–	3	–	2	2	–	3	–	3
Indiana	1	–	3	–	0	4	–	4	–	0
Northwestern	1	–	3	–	0	4	–	4	–	0
Wisconsin	0	–	2	–	2	2	–	3	–	3
$ – Conference champion; Rankings from Dickinson System

The 1924 Minnesota Golden Gophers football team represented the University of Minnesota in the 1924 Big Ten Conference football season. In their third year under head coach William H. Spaulding, the Golden Gophers compiled a 3–3–2 record and outscored their opponents by a combined score of 68 to 62. It was Minnesota's first season playing in Memorial Stadium.

Guard George Abramson and tackle Ted Cox were named All-Big Ten first team.

Total attendance for the season was 139,772, which averaged to 23,297. The season high for attendance was against Illinois.

== Schedule ==
Date	Opponent	Site	Result	Attendance	Source
October 4	North Dakota*	Memorial Stadium; Minneapolis, MN	W 14–0	16,000	
October 11	Haskell*	Memorial Stadium; Minneapolis, MN	W 20–0	18,000	
October 18	at Wisconsin	Camp Randall Stadium; Madison, WI (rivalry)	T 7–7	25,000	
October 25	at Iowa	Iowa Field; Iowa City, IA (rivalry)	L 0–13	30,000	
November 1	Michigan^{†}	Memorial Stadium; Minneapolis, MN (Little Brown Jug)	L 0–13	43,000–50,000	
November 8	Iowa State*	Memorial Stadium; Minneapolis, MN	T 7–7	12,000	
November 15	Illinois	Memorial Stadium; Minneapolis, MN	W 20–7	35,341	
November 22	Vanderbilt*	Memorial Stadium; Minneapolis, MN	L 0–16	16,000–18,500	
*Non-conference game; ^{†}Homecoming

== Game summaries ==
=== Michigan ===
Michigan at Minnesota

Team	1	2	3	4	Total
• Michigan	6	7	0	0	13
Minnesota	0	0	0	0	0

- Date: November 1, 1924
- Location: Memorial Stadium • Minneapolis, MN
- Game attendance: 45,000
- Referee: Masker (Northwestern)

For its fifth game, Minnesota hosted Michigan in the first Big Ten Conference game played in the new horseshoe-shaped Memorial Stadium. Michigan recovered a fumble in Minnesota territory, and William Herrnstein caught a 30-yard touchdown pass to give Michigan a 6–0 lead. In the second quarter, Michigan scored again, as Ferdinand Rockwell ran around the end for a touchdown on a faked field goal attempt. Rockwell also kicked the extra point, and Michigan won the game, 13–0.
