= Ross–Ade Stadium =

Home stadium of the Purdue Boilermakers. West Lafayette, Indiana

- "Home of the Boilermakers"
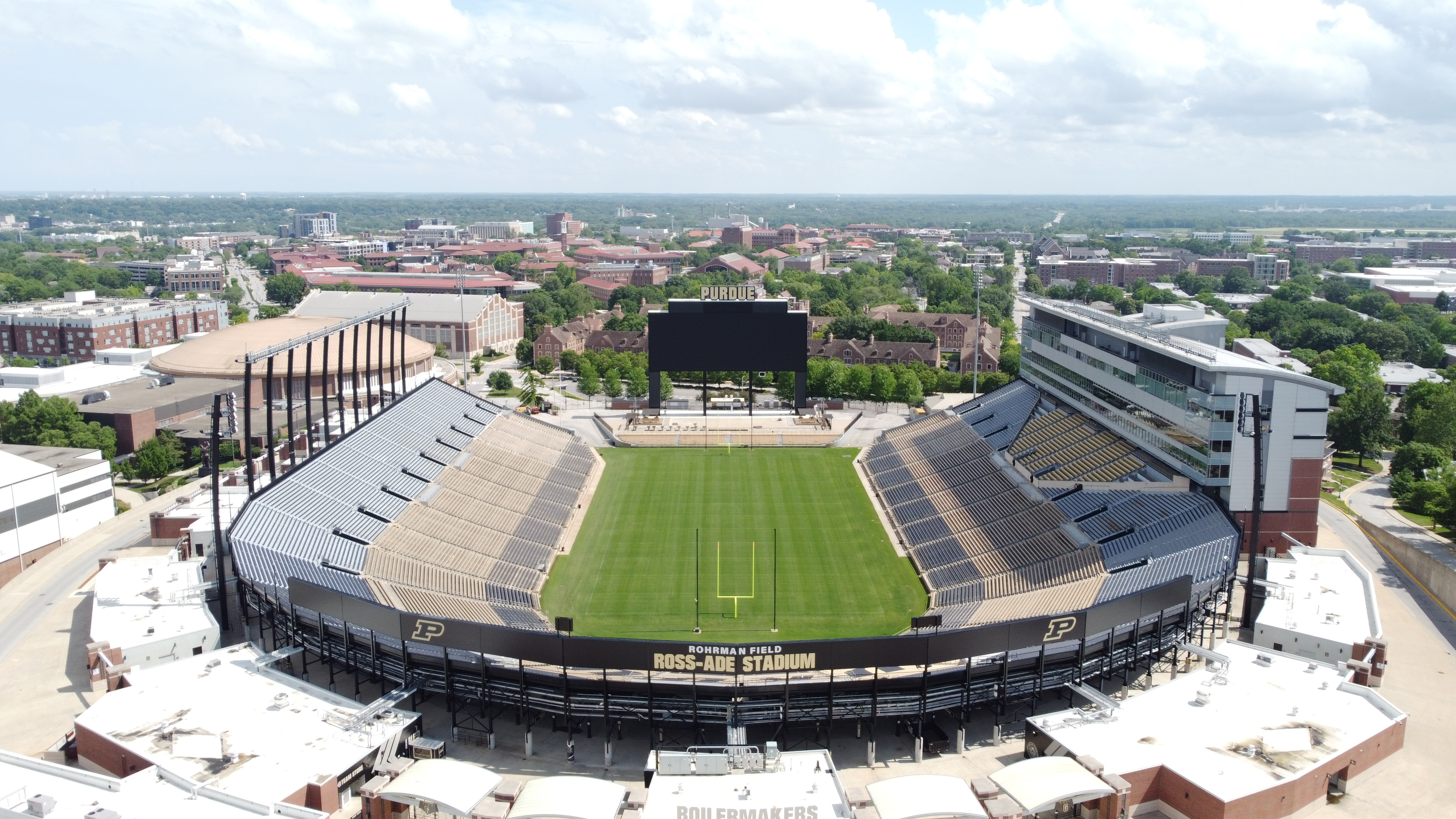
- Aerial view from north-northwest in 2021

- Location within the United States Location within Indiana
- Address: 850 Steven Beering Drive
- Location: Purdue University; West Lafayette, Indiana, U.S.
- Coordinates: 40°26′4″N 86°55′6″W
- Owner: Purdue University
- Operator: Purdue University
- Capacity: 61,441 (2023–present)
- Surface: Natural grass

Construction
- Groundbreaking: June 2, 1924
- Opened: November 22, 1924; 101 years ago
- Renovated: 2002, 2023
- Expanded: 1930, 1949, 1955, 1964, 1969, 2023
- Cost: $237,500 ($4.46 million in 2025 dollars) $70 million (2002 renovation) ($125 million in 2025 dollars) $45.4 million (2023 renovation)
- Architects: Osborn Engineering Company (Original); HNTB (2002 Renovation)
- General contractor: A.E. Kemmer (Original Construction)

Tenant
- Purdue Boilermakers (NCAA) (1924–present)

Ross–Ade Stadium is a college football stadium in the midwestern United States, located on the campus of Purdue University in West Lafayette, Indiana. It is the home field of Purdue Boilermakers of the Big Ten Conference.

== History ==
The stadium was built 102 years ago in 1924 to replace Stuart Field, which had been hosting Purdue football since 1892. It is named in honor of Purdue alumni David E. Ross and George Ade, the principal benefactors. In 1922 Ade and Ross bought 65 acres (26 ha) of land for the site of the new stadium. They also provided additional financial support for construction of the facility. Ross–Ade Stadium opened on November 22, with a seating capacity of 13,500—roughly corresponding to the lower portion of the current facility's west grandstand---and standing room for an additional 5,000 people. In 2001, Purdue University began a $70 million renovation, including widening both aisles and seats, which led to a reduced seating capacity of 62,500.

The first game in November 1924 was a 26–7 homecoming victory over rival Indiana.

The largest attendance for a game in Ross-Ade is 71,629, which was in 1980 against Indiana on November 22.

In summer 2017, Ross–Ade Stadium installed permanent stadium lights.

In March 2019 it was announced that a memorial for Superfan Tyler Trent, who died on January 1, 2019, at the age of 20 from osteosarcoma, a type of bone cancer, would be placed at Student Section Gate entrance in his honor.

On December 6, 2019, it was announced that, due to a $15 million gift, the facility's new name would be Rohrman Field at Ross–Ade Stadium.

On September 4, 2021, the Boilermakers opened their 97th season in the 500th game at Ross-Ade with a 30–21 win over Oregon State.

== Renovations ==
=== Early 2000s renovations ===
In the spring of 2000, it was announced that Ross–Ade would undergo a three-phase renovation, beginning the following year. A breakdown of each phase is as follows:

==== Phase I (2001–2003) ====
- Replace the 50-year-old Woodworth Memorial Press Box, located on the west side of the stadium, with a four-story pavilion, housing the Shively Media Center, 34 luxury suites, and a 200-seat indoor club level
- Add outdoor club seats with exclusive access to the pavilion's suites
- Expand the main concourse
- Add new bathrooms and concession stands
- Add a new “grand staircase” to the south end of the stadium
- Replace all concrete and benches.

==== Phase II (TBA) ====
- Add an upper deck to the east side of stadium

==== Phase III (TBA) ====
- Add upper deck to north bend of stadium, connecting east upper deck and Pavilion

While originally thought that both Phases II and III would be solely dependent upon future ticket sales, former Athletic Director Morgan Burke indicated in early 2009 that the project may move forward in the near future, regardless of season ticket sales. Phase II and phase III were never completed.

=== Your Ross-Ade ===
In August 2022, the finalized plans and timeline for Phase I of renovations to Ross–Ade Stadium.

==== Phase I (2022) ====
At a cost of $45.4 million raised by donors, Ross-Ade stadium will be getting a south end zone renovation that will add approximately 4,500 seats bringing the total stadium capacity to 61,441. The student section, which will be growing by 5%, will be moved to the south end zone and the area to the east of it, and the band will sit in the front of the south end zone. There will be safe standing seats, patio and deck areas, and rail seating. The Tyler Trent Student Gate will be moved. Additionally, Tiller Tunnel, named after the late Joe Tiller, will be constructed connecting the Kozuch Football Performance Center to the stadium in the northeast corner of the stadium. Finally, the team shop located outside the north of the stadium will be converted into a student-athlete dining facility. The construction began at the completion of the 2022 football season and the south end zone and tunnel will be completed by the beginning of the 2023 season. The dining facility will not be ready until at least January 2024 per Mike Bobinski on December 22, 2022.

==== Phase II (TBA) ====
While it is unclear what renovations will come with Phase II, it has been said that "additional phase construction timelines will be determined by philanthropic support."

=== Additional proposals ===
There has been a desire expressed by both former head coach Joe Tiller and Burke to remove seating in the south end zone to use the land for alternative purposes. Tiller and subsequently the school's architectural department, has proposed using the land for football administrative offices and locker rooms. Burke has proposed shaping the land into a landscaped hill, providing lush views of campus scenery. Ultimately, these bleachers were removed in the summer of 2014, with restorative work performed on the concrete foundation on which the bleachers sat.

=== Other renovations ===
- In 2004, a limestone and brick tunnel was dedicated to the memory of the 17 football players, coaches, alumni, and fans who died in the 1903 Purdue Wreck in Indianapolis.
- In June 2006, the Kentucky bluegrass was replaced by Bermuda grass. The Prescription Athletic Turf system is still in use.
- In July 2006, Action Sports Media announced a ten-year partnership with Purdue, helping finance the installation of a new state-of-the-art 31-by-68-foot (9.4 by 20.7 m) Daktronics video board, priced at $1.7 million, and sideline advertising panel. The new technology was installed in time for the start of the 2007 season.
- In June 2014, the south end-zone bleachers, which seated 6,100 spectators, were removed to avoid necessary safety upgrades and in preparation for proposed renovations. The area was converted to a patio area for fans to enjoy a more party like atmosphere. There were several tables set up with a large concessions tent to anchor the middle of the area. This is the first time a regular game attendee could purchase alcohol.
- In 2017, permanent lighting was installed at a cost of $5.6 million so that games could be played at night without needing to rent lighting.
- In 2019, a ribbon board was installed above the north end zone seating. This Daktronics board measures 575 by 10 feet (175.3 by 3.0 m). Additionally, the Tyler Trent Student Gate was installed on the east side of the stadium.
- In 2020, a new Daktronics board was installed in the south end zone. This is the first HDR display in college football and measures 150.33 by 56.75 feet (45.82 by 17.30 m). It is four times larger than the previous board, the second largest in college football (behind Jordan-Hare Stadium's), and among the largest video screens in the world. This was a $10 million project.

== Night games at Ross-Ade Stadium ==
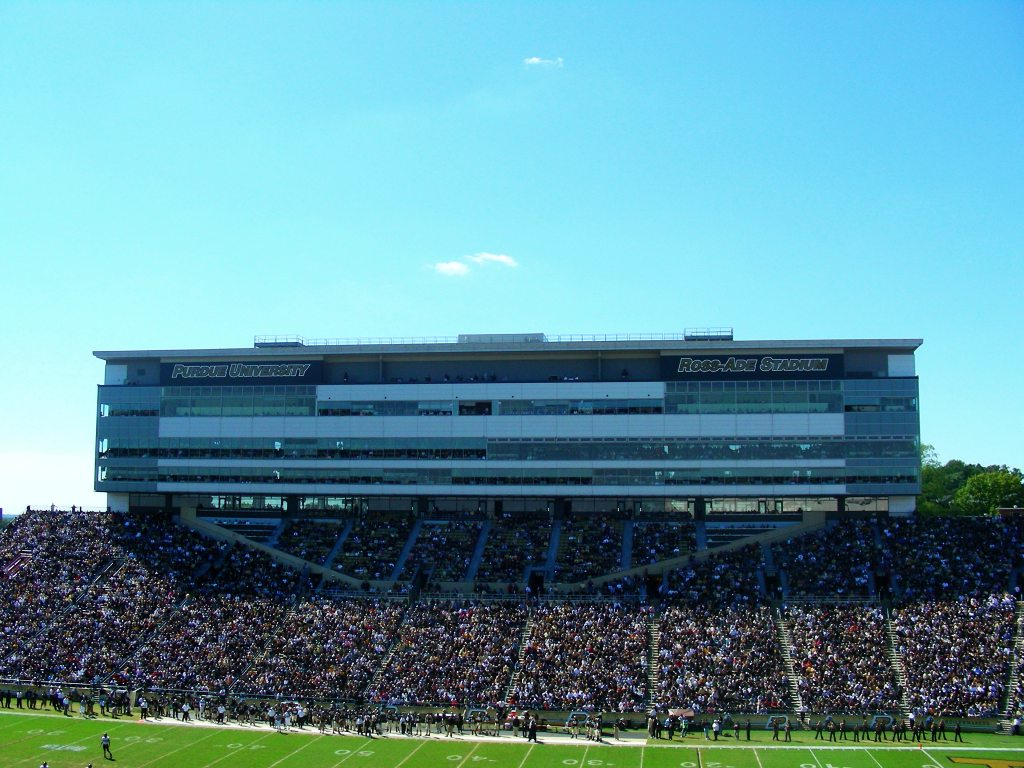
The press box in 2011

Temporary lights (1–7)

- October 18, 1986: Ohio State L 11–39
- September 10, 1994: Toledo W 51–17
- September 21, 1996: West Virginia L 6–20
- October 1, 2005: Notre Dame L 28–49
- October 6, 2007: Ohio State L 7–23
- September 26, 2009: Notre Dame L 21–24
- October 1, 2011: Notre Dame L 10–38
- September 14, 2013: (21) Notre Dame L 24–31

Under permanent lights (8–9)

- September 8, 2017: Ohio W 44–21
- October 28, 2017: Nebraska L 24–25
- August 30, 2018: Northwestern L 27–31
- September 15, 2018: Missouri L 37–40
- October 20, 2018: (2) Ohio State W 49–20
- September 14, 2019: TCU L 13–34
- September 4, 2021: Oregon State W 30–21
- September 1, 2022: Penn State L 31–35
- September 24, 2022: Florida Atlantic W 28–26
- October 15, 2022: Nebraska W 43–37
- September 16, 2023: Syracuse L 20–35
- September 22, 2023: Wisconsin L 17–38
- October 18, 2024: Oregon L 0–35
- September 6, 2025: Southern Illinois W 34–17
- November 28, 2025: (2) Indiana L 3–56
- September 4, 2026: Indiana State W 44–19
- October 10, 2026: Minnesota W 41–13
- October 16, 2026: Washington

== See also ==
- List of NCAA Division I FBS football stadiums
