= 1924 Chicago Maroons football team =

American college football season

1924 Chicago Maroons football

Big Ten champion
- Conference: Big Ten Conference
- Record: 4–1–3 (3–0–3 Big Ten)
- Head coach: Amos Alonzo Stagg (33rd season)
- Captain: Frank Gowdy
- Home stadium: Stagg Field

Uniform
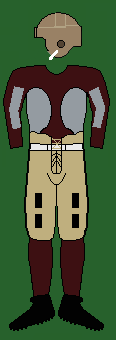

1924 Big Ten Conference football standings
	Conf.					Overall
Team	W		L		T	W		L		T
No. 11 Chicago $	3	–	0	–	3	4	–	1	–	3
No. 4 Illinois	3	–	1	–	1	6	–	1	–	1
No. 6 Iowa	3	–	1	–	1	6	–	1	–	1
Michigan	4	–	2	–	0	6	–	2	–	0
Purdue	2	–	2	–	0	5	–	2	–	0
Minnesota	1	–	2	–	1	3	–	3	–	2
Ohio State	1	–	3	–	2	2	–	3	–	3
Indiana	1	–	3	–	0	4	–	4	–	0
Northwestern	1	–	3	–	0	4	–	4	–	0
Wisconsin	0	–	2	–	2	2	–	3	–	3
$ – Conference champion; Rankings from Dickinson System

The 1924 Chicago Maroons football team was an American football team that represented the University of Chicago during the 1924 Big Ten Conference football season. In their 33rd season under head coach Amos Alonzo Stagg, the Maroons compiled a 4–1–3 record, won the Big Ten Conference championship, and outscored their opponents by a combined total of 88 to 40.

Notable players on the 1924 Chicago team included guard Joe Pondelik and tackle Frank Gowdy. Pondelik was a consensus first-team All-American in 1924. Gowdy was selected as a first-team All-American by several selectors, including Football World, Liberty magazine, and All-Sports Magazine.

Fritz Crisler was an assistant coach on the team.

This was the seventh and final Big Ten championship won by the Maroons.

== Schedule ==
Date	Opponent	Site	Result	Attendance	Source
October 4	Missouri*	Stagg Field; Chicago, IL	L 0–3		
October 11	Brown*	Stagg Field; Chicago, IL	W 19–7	26,000	
October 18	Indiana	Stagg Field; Chicago, IL	W 23–0		
October 25	at Ohio State	Ohio Stadium; Columbus, OH	T 3–3	40,000	
November 1	Purdue	Stagg Field; Chicago, IL (rivalry)	W 19–6		
November 8	Illinois	Stagg Field; Chicago, IL	T 21–21	32,543	
November 15	Northwestern	Stagg Field; Chicago, IL	W 3–0		
November 22	Wisconsin	Stagg Field; Chicago, IL	T 0–0		
*Non-conference game
