= 1924 Illinois Fighting Illini football team =

American college football season

1924 Illinois Fighting Illini football
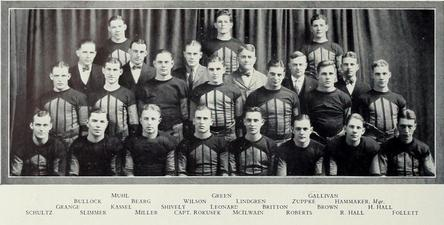
- Conference: Big Ten Conference
- Record: 6–1–1 (3–1–1 Big Ten)
- Head coach: Robert Zuppke (12th season)
- Offensive scheme: Single-wing
- Captain: Frank E. Rokusek
- Home stadium: Memorial Stadium

Uniform
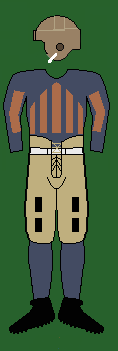

1924 Big Ten Conference football standings
	Conf.					Overall
Team	W		L		T	W		L		T
No. 11 Chicago $	3	–	0	–	3	4	–	1	–	3
No. 4 Illinois	3	–	1	–	1	6	–	1	–	1
No. 6 Iowa	3	–	1	–	1	6	–	1	–	1
Michigan	4	–	2	–	0	6	–	2	–	0
Purdue	2	–	2	–	0	5	–	2	–	0
Minnesota	1	–	2	–	1	3	–	3	–	2
Ohio State	1	–	3	–	2	2	–	3	–	3
Indiana	1	–	3	–	0	4	–	4	–	0
Northwestern	1	–	3	–	0	4	–	4	–	0
Wisconsin	0	–	2	–	2	2	–	3	–	3
$ – Conference champion; Rankings from Dickinson System

The 1924 Illinois Fighting Illini football team was an American football team that represented the University of Illinois as a member of the Big Ten Conference during the 1924 Big Ten season. In their twelfth year under head coach Robert Zuppke, the Fighting Illini compiled a 6–1–1 record (3–1–1 in conference games), tied for second place in the Big Ten, and outscored opponents by a total of 204 to 71. The team was ranked No. 4 in the final Dickinson System rankings for 1924.

After an undefeated season in 1923, and with the return of halfback Red Grange, expectations were high for the Illini in 1924. In a 39–14 victory over Michigan, Grange scored five touchdowns and gained 402 yards on 21 plays. The Illini also defeated Nebraska (9–6), Iowa (36–0), and Ohio State (7–0), tied with Chicago (21–21), and lost to Minnesota (7–20).

Grange, known as "The Galloping Ghost", was a unanimous pick on the 1924 All-America team. He also received the inaugural Chicago Tribune Silver Football as the most valuable player in the Big Ten. Eight Illinois players received honors on the 1924 All-Big Ten Conference football team.

== Schedule ==
Date	Time	Opponent	Site	Result	Attendance	Source
October 4	2:00 p.m.	at Nebraska*	Memorial Stadium; Lincoln, NE	W 9–6	22,355	
October 11		Butler*	Memorial Stadium; Champaign, IL	W 40–10	12,599	
October 18		Michigan	Memorial Stadium; Champaign, IL (rivalry)	W 39–14	66,609	
October 25		DePauw*	Memorial Stadium; Champaign, IL	W 45–0	12,196	
November 1		Iowa	Memorial Stadium; Champaign, IL	W 36–0	31,330	
November 8		at Chicago	Stagg Field; Chicago, IL	T 21–21	32,543	
November 15		at Minnesota	Memorial Stadium; Minneapolis, MN	L 7–20	35,341–40,000	
November 22		Ohio State	Memorial Stadium; Champaign, IL (rivalry)	W 7–0	27,378	
*Non-conference game

== Game summaries ==
=== Michigan ===
Michigan at Illinois

Team	1	2	3	4	Total
Michigan	0	7	0	7	14
• Illinois	27	0	6	6	39

- Date: October 18, 1924
- Location: Memorial Stadium • Champaign, IL
- Game attendance: 67,000
- Referee: C. J. Masker (Northwestern)

Illinois defeated Michigan on October 18, 1924, by a score of 39–14. The game was played before 66,609 spectators, the largest crowd of Illinois' 1924 season. Red Grange gained national notoriety for his performance in the game. Grange returned the opening kick-off 95 yards for a touchdown and scored four touchdowns in the first quarter to give Illinois a 27–0 lead. Grange scored five touchdowns in the game and gained 402 yards on 21 plays. The New York Times reported: "Unbiased experts agree that his performance was among the greatest ever seen on an American gridiron."

== Awards and honors ==
Halfback Red Grange received the inaugural Chicago Tribune Silver Football award as the most valuable player in the Big Ten. He was also a unanimous pick among the major selectors for the 1924 All-America team, including first-team honors from Walter Camp, All-America Board, Football World, International News Service (INS), Liberty magazine, Newspaper Enterprise Association, Norman E. Brown, Lawrence Perry, Billy Evans, and Walter Eckersall. Grange was later inducted into the College Football Hall of Fame in 1951.

End Frank Rokusek was also the team captain.

Eight other Illinois players received honors from at least one selector for the 1924 All-Big Ten Conference football team:

- Grange (Billy Evans first team; Bill Ingram first team; Daily Illini first team; Hank Casserly first team; The Indianapolis News first team; Larry Dailey first team; Walter Eckersall first team)
- Halfback Wally McIlwain (Daily Illini first team, Walter Eckersall first team)
- End Chuck Kassel (Daily Illini first team, Walter Eckersall first team)
- End Frank Rokusek (Hank Casserly first team, The Indianapolis News second team, Larry Dailey second team)
- Fullback Earl Britton (The Indianapolis News second team, Larry Dailey second team, Walter Eckersall third team);
- Guard Louis F. Slimmer (Hank Casserly second team, The Indianapolis News third team)
- Quarterback Harry A. Hall (Larry Dailey second team)
- Tackle Richard L. Hall (The Indianapolis News second team)
