= 1924 Iowa Hawkeyes football team =

American college football season

1924 Iowa Hawkeyes football
- Conference: Big Ten Conference
- Record: 6–1–1 (3–1–1 Big Ten)
- Head coach: Burt Ingwersen (1st season)
- MVP: Leland Parkin
- Captain: Leland Parkin
- Home stadium: Iowa Field

Uniform
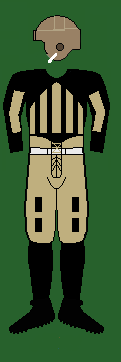

1924 Big Ten Conference football standings
	Conf.					Overall
Team	W		L		T	W		L		T
No. 11 Chicago $	3	–	0	–	3	4	–	1	–	3
No. 4 Illinois	3	–	1	–	1	6	–	1	–	1
No. 6 Iowa	3	–	1	–	1	6	–	1	–	1
Michigan	4	–	2	–	0	6	–	2	–	0
Purdue	2	–	2	–	0	5	–	2	–	0
Minnesota	1	–	2	–	1	3	–	3	–	2
Ohio State	1	–	3	–	2	2	–	3	–	3
Indiana	1	–	3	–	0	4	–	4	–	0
Northwestern	1	–	3	–	0	4	–	4	–	0
Wisconsin	0	–	2	–	2	2	–	3	–	3
$ – Conference champion; Rankings from Dickinson System

The 1924 Iowa Hawkeyes football team was an American football team that represented the University of Iowa as a member of the Big Ten Conference during the 1924 Big Ten football season. In their first season under head coach Burt Ingwersen, the Hawkeyes compiled a 6–1–1 record (3–1–1 in conference games), tied for second place in the BIg Ten, outscored opponents by a total of 106 to 50, and was ranked No. 6 in the final AP poll.

Three Iowa players received first-team honors on the 1924 All-Big Ten Conference football team: quarterback Leland Parkin; tackle John W. Hancock; and end Lowell Otte.

The team played its home games at Iowa Field in Iowa City, Iowa.

== Schedule ==
Date	Opponent	Site	Result	Attendance	Source
October 4	Southeastern Oklahoma State*	Iowa Field; Iowa City, IA	W 43–0		
October 11	Ohio State	Iowa Field; Iowa City, IA	T 0–0	25,000	
October 18	Lawrence*	Iowa Field; Iowa City, IA	W 13–5		
October 25	Minnesota^{†}	Iowa Field; Iowa City, IA (rivalry)	W 13–0	30,000	
November 1	at Illinois	Memorial Stadium; Champaign, IL	L 0–36	31,330	
November 8	Butler*	Iowa Field; Iowa City, IA	W 7–0		
November 15	at Wisconsin	Camp Randall Stadium; Madison, WI (rivalry)	W 21–7		
November 22	at Michigan	Ferry Field; Ann Arbor, MI	W 9–2	47,000	
*Non-conference game; ^{†}Homecoming

== Players ==
The following 15 players received major varsity letters:

- R.G. Dauber, Iowa City, Iowa
- Darrell Fisher, halfback/fullback, Des Moines, Iowa
- William Fleckenstein, guard, Faribault, Minnesota
- W. L. Fry, halfback, Manning, Iowa
- Ledrue Galloway, tackle, sophomore, Council Bluffs, Iowa (early African-American player)
- Don M. Graham, fullback, Waterloo, Iowa
- H.W. Griffen, center, Sioux City, Iowa
- John W. Hancock, tackle/end, Superior, Wisconsin
- Paul R. Krasuski, guard/tackle, Davenport, Iowa
- F.M. Olson, guard, Sioux City, Iowa
- Lowell Otte, end, Sidney, Iowa
- Leland Parkin, quarterback and captain, Waterloo, Iowa
- R.E. "Dick" Romey, end/tackle, Mason City, Iowa
- Wilbur Scantlebury, halfback/fullback, Hampton, Iowa
- John A. Schirmer, halfback, Sioux Falls, South Dakota

Eight other players received minor letters:

- Charles Brookins, Oskaloosa, Iowa
- A.A. Daniels, Washington, Iowa
- T.D. Hines, center, Cedar Rapids, Iowa
- R.H. Hogan, Osage, Iowa
- J. Scott McIntyre, Superior, Wisconsin
- Leonard Raffensperger, guard, Victor, Iowa
- H.H. Rice, Washington, Iowa
- P.E. Smith, Waterloo, Iowa
