= 1924 Purdue Boilermakers football team =

American college football season

1924 Purdue Boilermakers football
- Conference: Big Ten Conference
- Record: 5–2 (2–2 Big Ten)
- Head coach: James Phelan (3rd season)
- Captain: Ralph Claypool
- Home stadium: Stuart Field; Ross–Ade Stadium

1924 Big Ten Conference football standings
	Conf.					Overall
Team	W		L		T	W		L		T
No. 11 Chicago $	3	–	0	–	3	4	–	1	–	3
No. 4 Illinois	3	–	1	–	1	6	–	1	–	1
No. 6 Iowa	3	–	1	–	1	6	–	1	–	1
Michigan	4	–	2	–	0	6	–	2	–	0
Purdue	2	–	2	–	0	5	–	2	–	0
Minnesota	1	–	2	–	1	3	–	3	–	2
Ohio State	1	–	3	–	2	2	–	3	–	3
Indiana	1	–	3	–	0	4	–	4	–	0
Northwestern	1	–	3	–	0	4	–	4	–	0
Wisconsin	0	–	2	–	2	2	–	3	–	3
$ – Conference champion; Rankings from Dickinson System

The 1924 Purdue Boilermakers football team was an American football team that represented Purdue University during the 1924 Big Ten Conference football season. In their third season under head coach James Phelan, the Boilermakers compiled a 5–2 record, finished in fifth place in the Big Ten Conference with a 2–2 record against conference opponents, and outscored opponents by a total of 137 to 46.

== Schedule ==
Date	Opponent	Site	Result	Source
September 27	Wabash*	Stuart Field; West Lafayette, IN	W 21–7	
October 4	at Ohio State	Ohio Stadium; Columbus, OH	L 0–7	
October 11	Rose-Hulman*	Stuart Field; West Lafayette, IN	W 41–3	
October 18	at Northwestern	Northwestern Field; Evanston, IL	W 7–3	
November 1	at Chicago	Stagg Field; Chicago, IL (rivalry)	L 6–19	
November 8	DePauw*	Stuart Field; West Lafayette, IN	W 36–0	
November 22	Indiana^{†}	Ross–Ade Stadium; West Lafayette, IN (Old Oaken Bucket)	W 26–7	
*Non-conference game; ^{†}Homecoming

== Roster ==
- Rudolph Bahr, HB
- J. T. Bolan, T
- Ralph Claypool, C
- Don Cunningham
- Larry Deephouse, G
- Harold Harmeson, RH
- Tom Hogan, E
- G. F. Houston, LH
- H. Mierau, G
- Don Monroe, FB
- C. Horace Pillman, E
- Paul Smiley, QB
- A. L. Spencer, G
- Mel Taube, QB
- Reginald Threlfall, C
- Ferd. Wellman, FB
- B. V. Worth, RH
