= Edward Slaughter =

American football player

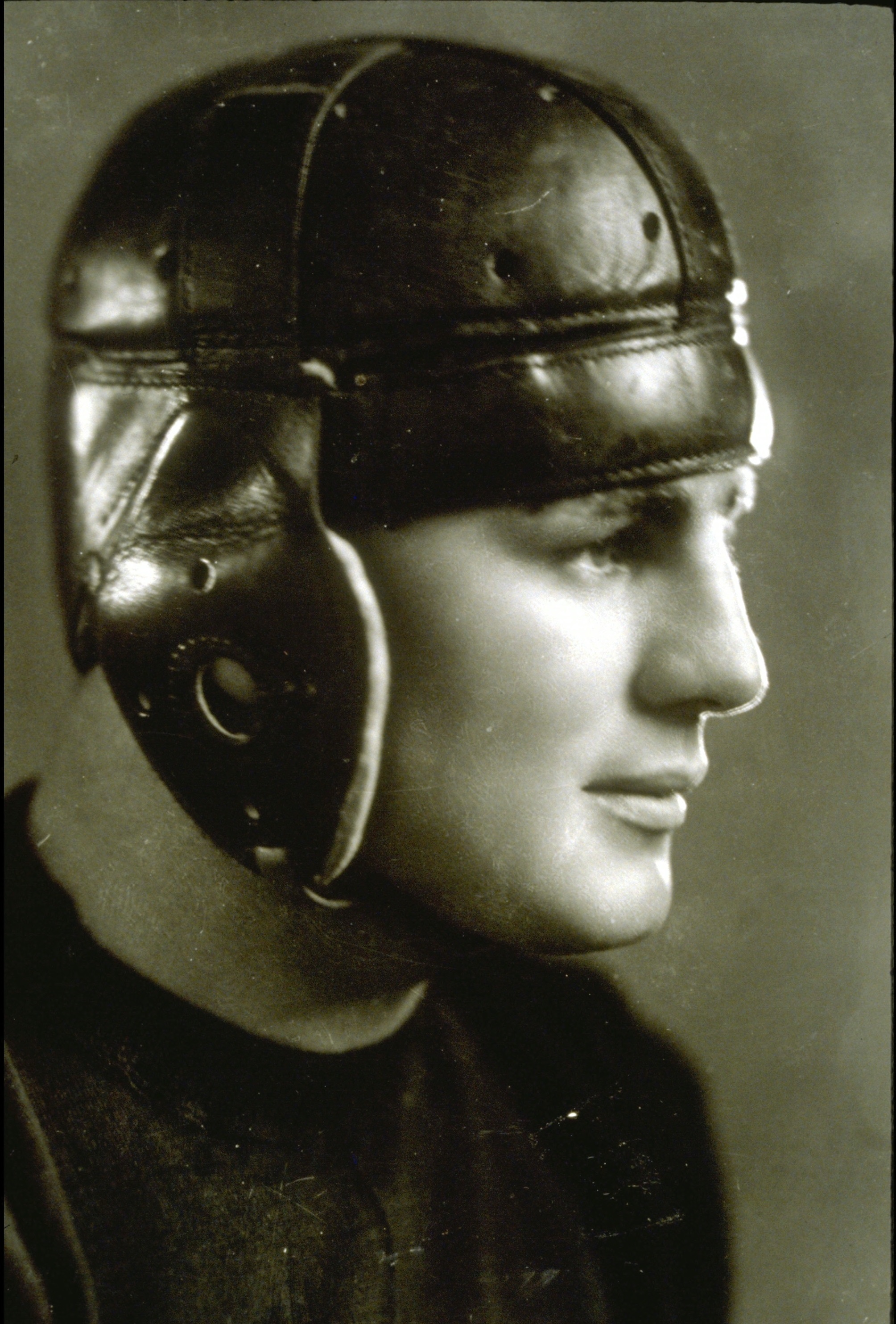
- Slaughter as shown in the 1925 Michiganensian (Bentley Image Bank)

Biographical details
- Born: February 26, 1903; Louisville, Kentucky, U.S.
- Died: June 30, 1985 (aged 82); Charlottesville, Virginia, U.S.

Playing career

Football
- 1922–1924: Michigan
- Position: Guard

Coaching career (HC unless noted)

Football
- 1925–1926: Wisconsin (line)
- 1927–1930: NC State (line)
- 1931–1940: Virginia (line)
- 1946–1948: Virginia (line)

Golf
- 1940–c. 1958: Virginia

Accomplishments and honors

Championships
- National (1923)

Awards
- First-team All-American (1924)

Edward Ratliff "Butch" Slaughter Sr. (February 26, 1903 – June 30, 1985), also known as Edliff Slaughter, was an American football player, athletic coach and professor of physical education. He played guard at the University of Michigan from 1922 to 1924, and was chosen as a first-team All-American in 1924. Slaughter served as an assistant football coach at the University of Wisconsin, North Carolina State University, and the University of Virginia. He was also a member of the faculty at the University of Virginia, and held a variety of positions, including Chairman of the Department of Physical Education and Director of Intramural Sports, from 1931 until his retirement in 1973.

== Early years ==
Slaughter was born in Louisville, Kentucky in 1903 and was an exceptional athlete. He played center and was the captain of the 1920 football team at Louisville Male High School in Louisville, Kentucky.

== Michigan ==
Slaughter enrolled at the University of Michigan in 1921 and played on Fielding H. Yost's football team as a guard from 1922 to 1924. Yost later credited Slaughter with "the greatest play in football I ever saw." The play took place in the last 18 seconds of the 1923 Michigan–Wisconsin game. Wisconsin had the ball at its own 35-yard line and needed to gain 65 yards for a score. A Wisconsin player caught a pass and appeared to be heading to a game-winning touchdown. Yost described Slaughter's "diving shoe-string tackle" as follows:

Suddenly, with a great burst of speed, a Michigan man went for him, grabbed him and downed him. I looked for the number of the Michigan man. Lo and behold, it was 'Butch' Slaughter, a guard, who, under ordinary circumstances, would have no more business in that part of the field than I would. Down Harris and Slaughter went on our 20-yard line, and with them went the chance of all chances for Wisconsin, for the whistle which ended the game blew at that moment.

Slaughter's play preserved an undefeated season for the 1923 team and helped them win the national football championship. At the end of the 1923 season, sports writer Lawrence Perry selected Slaughter as a first-team All-American at the guard position.

In the 1924 season, Michigan overcame a late 6–0 deficit to win, 16–6, against Ohio State. Slaughter scored a touchdown in the game to help George Little win his only game as coach against Ohio State.

At the end of the 1924 season, Slaughter was selected as a first-team All-American by Walter Camp for Collier's Weekly, Norman E. Brown, and Lawrence Perry. on the last All-American team selected by Walter Camp. In announcing his choice of Slaughter as an All-American, Walter Camp wrote:

Slaughter is a veteran guard who has always towered in any line of forwards. A big man, extremely active, he provides the pivotal spot upon which a line-plunging attack may rest. He carries his charge through so that he is never shoved back upon his runner. He is never guilty of 'knifing' through. Slaughter has unlimited endurance.

Sports columnist Norman E. Brown wrote, "Slaughter is one of the greatest defensive guards the Big Ten has had in recent years. ... On offense Slaughter could be counted on not only to open up a hole but "carry through" with the play." Life magazine wrote 25 years later that Slaughter had been "famous and feared for vicious tackling at Michigan."

Slaughter graduated from the University of Michigan with a Bachelor of Science degree in engineering.

== Wisconsin ==
In July 1925, Slaughter was hired as assistant coach for the University of Wisconsin Badgers football team. Slaughter coached the Wisconsin linemen under head coach George Little, who had coached Slaughter at Michigan. His former Michigan teammate, Irwin Uteritz, was also hired by Little as an assistant coach to work with the Wisconsin backfield players. Slaughter remained the line coach at Wisconsin for the 1925 and 1926 college football seasons.

In September 1926, reports were published indicating that Slaughter had signed to play professional football with Red Grange. However, Slaughter turned down the offer, noting that he would be barred from coaching in the Big Ten Conference if he signed as a professional football player.

== North Carolina State ==
In April 1927, Slaughter was hired as an assistant football coach at North Carolina State College. He was an assistant coach at North Carolina State under Gus Tebell. During the 1927 season, Slaughter handled the linemen, while Tebell worked with the backfield players.

In 1928, Slaughter was hired as the line coach at Michigan State University but failed to report for the job. When the Spartan squad assembled for practice on September 10, 1928, Slaughter was not on hand. Coach Harry Kipke gave him the benefit of the doubt, assuming the Spartans used the same early practice date as the Big Ten, September 15. When Slaughter failed to arrive on that date, Kipke sent him several telegrams but received no response. North Carolina State announced on September 20, 1928, that Slaughter had been retained for another year as its line coach. Slaughter continued serving as line coach for the North Carolina State Wolfpack through the 1930 football season.

== Virginia ==
In March 1931, Slaughter was hired as an assistant football coach at the University of Virginia, where he was put in charge of the linemen under new head coach Fred Dawson. Slaughter was an assistant coach under Lawson from 1931 to 1933. In 1934, Gus Tebell took over as the head coach at Virginia, and Slaughter stayed on as the line coach under Tebell through the 1936 season. When Frank Murray replaced Tebell as head football coach in February 1937, Slaughter was kept on line coach.

In July 1940, Slaughter left the football team to assume a faculty position as an instructor in Virginia's physical education department and was replaced by another University of Michigan All-American Ralph Heikkinen as the Cavaliers' line coach. Slaughter continued to serve on Virginia's faculty, becoming an assistant professor in 1944 and an associate professor in 1950. He also served as a member of the University Senate, Chairman of the Department of Physical Education, and Chairman of the Processions Committee and received the IMP Society Faculty Award in 1965.

Slaughter also took over as the coach of Virginia's golf team in 1940. In his first year as the coach of the golf team, one of his athletes, Dixon Brooke, won the NCAA Division I Men's Golf Championships. Slaughter also served as the chairman of the ACC Golf Coaches Association. He coached the Cavaliers' golf team from 1940 through at least the 1965 season.

From 1946 to 1948, he also returned to football coaching as an assistant football coach under Arthur Guepe, the fourth Virginia head coach for whom Slaughter served as line coach.

Slaughter also served as the Director of the Department of Intramurals at the University of Virginia from 1957 to 1973. Slaughter retired from the University of Virginia in 1973. In November 1982, the Slaughter Recreation Center, a new intramural athletic center on the University of Virginia campus, was dedicated in honor of Slaughter.

== Death and family ==
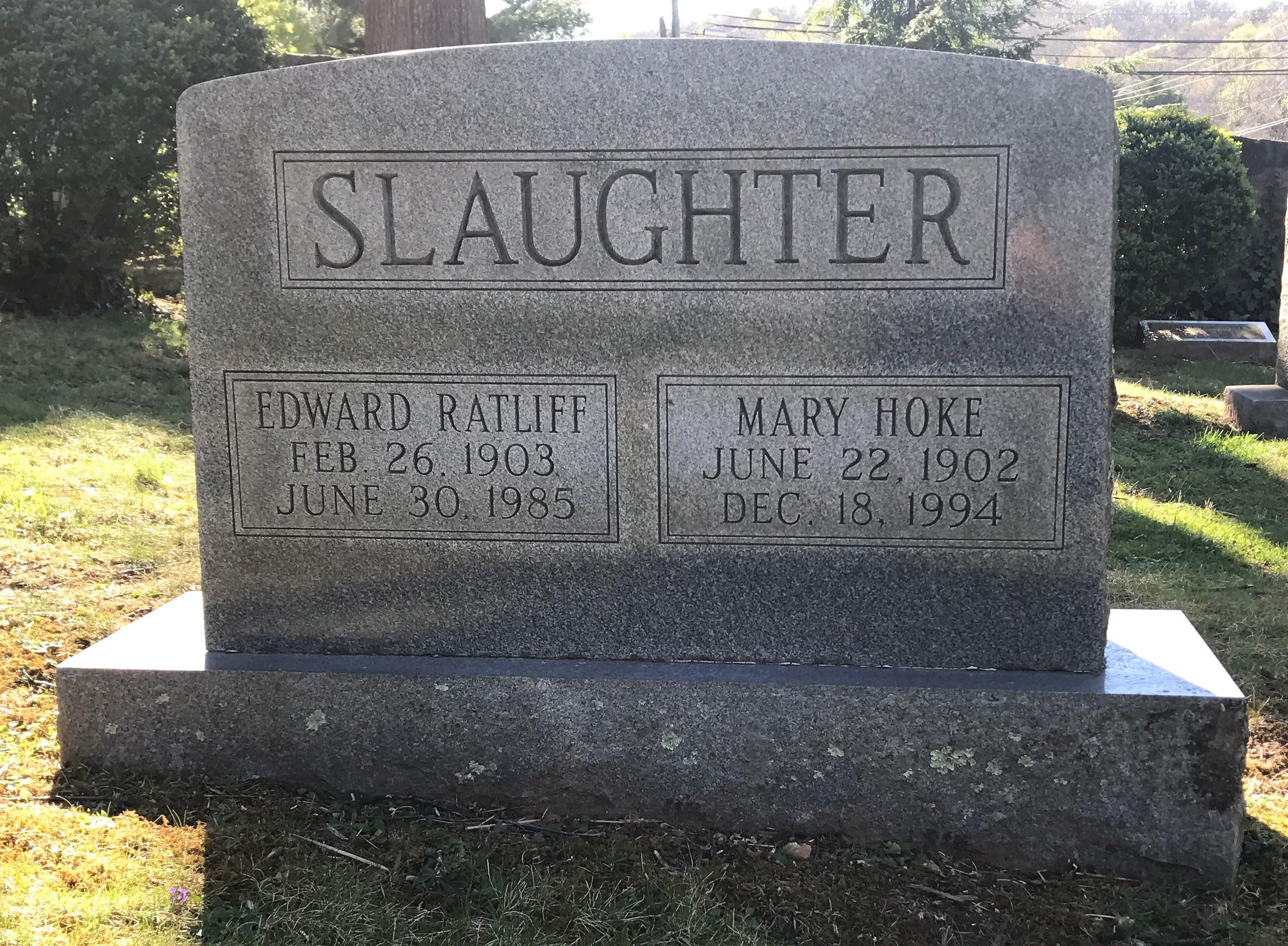
Slaughter's gravestone at the University of Virginia Cemetery in Charlottesville, Virginia.

Slaughter died in 1985 at age 82. After learning of Slaughter's death, Joe Palumbo, captain of Virginia's 1951 football team said: "I best remember Butch Slaughter as a prince among men. Above all else he expected his players to play fair both on and off the field. The players all loved him. He is one in a million." He is buried at the University of Virginia cemetery.

Slaughter was married to Mary McBee Hoke. His daughter, Mary Slaughter, became the first woman to play a varsity sport at the University of Virginia in 1954. There were no women's athletic teams at Virginia at that time, and she joined the men's tennis team and won the Women's Eastern Intercollegiate title. Slaughter's son, Edward R. Slaughter Jr., became a lawyer and served in 1978 as the president of the Virginia Bar Association.

His granddaughter is lawyer and political figure Anne-Marie Slaughter.

== See also ==
- List of Michigan Wolverines football All-Americans
