= 1924 Indiana Hoosiers football team =

American college football season

1924 Indiana Hoosiers football
- Conference: Big Ten Conference
- Record: 4–4 (1–3 Big Ten)
- Head coach: Bill Ingram (2nd season)
- MVP: Stu Butler
- Captain: Joseph Sloate
- Home stadium: Jordan Field

1924 Big Ten Conference football standings
	Conf.					Overall
Team	W		L		T	W		L		T
No. 11 Chicago $	3	–	0	–	3	4	–	1	–	3
No. 4 Illinois	3	–	1	–	1	6	–	1	–	1
No. 6 Iowa	3	–	1	–	1	6	–	1	–	1
Michigan	4	–	2	–	0	6	–	2	–	0
Purdue	2	–	2	–	0	5	–	2	–	0
Minnesota	1	–	2	–	1	3	–	3	–	2
Ohio State	1	–	3	–	2	2	–	3	–	3
Indiana	1	–	3	–	0	4	–	4	–	0
Northwestern	1	–	3	–	0	4	–	4	–	0
Wisconsin	0	–	2	–	2	2	–	3	–	3
$ – Conference champion; Rankings from Dickinson System

The 1924 Indiana Hoosiers football team represented the Indiana Hoosiers in the 1924 Big Ten Conference football season as members of the Big Ten Conference. The Hoosiers played their home games at Jordan Field in Bloomington, Indiana. The team was coached by Bill Ingram, in his second year as head coach.

== Schedule ==
Date	Opponent	Site	Result	Attendance	Source
September 27	Rose Polytechnic*	Jordan Field; Bloomington, IN	W 65–0		
October 4	DePauw*	Jordan Field; Bloomington, IN	W 21–0		
October 11	vs. LSU*	Indianapolis, IN	L 14–20		
October 18	at Chicago	Stagg Field; Chicago, IL	L 0–23		
November 1	at Northwestern	Dyche Stadium; Evanston, IL	L 7–17		
November 8	at Ohio State	Ohio Stadium; Columbus OH	W 12–7	20,000	
November 15	Wabash*	Jordan Field; Bloomington, IN	W 21–7		
November 22	at Purdue	Ross–Ade Stadium; West Lafayette, IN (rivalry)	L 7–26		
*Non-conference game
