= Liberty (magazine) =

Liberty magazine may refer to:

- Liberty (1881–1908), a political magazine published from 1881 to 1908 by Benjamin Tucker
- Liberty (general interest magazine), published from 1924 to 1950
- Liberty (libertarian magazine), published from 1987 to 2010, transitioned to online-only starting in 2011
- Liberty (Adventist magazine), a religious liberty magazine published by the Seventh-day Adventist Church

== See also ==
- Liberty (newspaper)
- Liberty (disambiguation)
