= Herb Steger =

American football player, coach, and official (1902–1968)

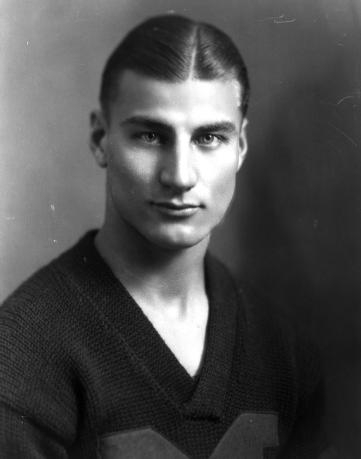
- Herb Steger cropped from 1922 Michigan football team photograph

Biographical details
- Born: July 12, 1902
- Died: July 20, 1968 (aged 66); Oak Park, Illinois, U.S.

Playing career
- 1922–1924: Michigan
- Position: Halfback

Coaching career (HC unless noted)
- 1925–1931: Northwestern (assistant)

Accomplishments and honors

Championships
- National (1923)

Herbert F. Steger (July 12, 1902 – July 20, 1968) was an American football player, coach and official. He played for the University of Michigan from 1922 to 1924. Steger later served as an assistant football coach at Northwestern University from 1925 to 1931 and a Big Ten Conference football official from 1931 to 1953.

== Biography ==
=== Oak Park ===
A native of Oak Park, Illinois, Steger was the halfback for the Oak Park High School football team coached by Glenn Thistlethwaite, who later became the head football coach at Northwestern. During the time that Steger played for Thistlethwaite, the Oak Park football team went through four consecutive seasons without a loss.

=== Michigan ===
In 1921, Steger enrolled at the University of Michigan where he played halfback from 1922 to 1924, helping the Wolverines to back-to-back undefeated football seasons in 1922 and 1923. He was considered a "triple threat" player who had "about equal ability in kicking, forward passing and carrying the ball."

In Steger's sophomore year of 1922, the Wolverines were 6–0–1 and outscored opponents by a combined tally of 183 to 13. In Steger's first game for Michigan, he ran 60 yards for a touchdown on his first carry. Steger developed appendicitis late in the 1922 season and underwent surgery in Chicago in December 1922.

As a junior in 1923, Steger helped lead the Wolverines to an 8–0 record and outscored opponents 150 to 12.

Michigan's first conference game in 1923 was against Ohio State in Ann Arbor. Fifty-thousand spectators watched Michigan shut out the Buckeyes 23–0. Michigan's first touchdown was scored on a 16-yard pass from Irwin Uteritz to Steger in the third quarter.

Some suggested during the 1923 season that Steger "has even outshone, the great Kipke." An NEA news service profile in late October 1923 praised Steger's diverse talents:

"Steger, today, ranks as one of the best gridders Yost has had in seasons. Captain Harry Kipke not excepted. Fleet of foot, a good forward passer, splendid punter, and an expert field goal kicker, the former Oak Park lad is a triple threat artist de luxe. There is no getting away from that. He also is as good a bet as the Wolverines boast on the receiving end of a pass, having the uncanny ability to grab 'em out of the air on almost impossible chances."

At the end of the 1923 football season, Steger was elected as captain of the 1924 Michigan Wolverines football team. Through the first half of October 1924, the Wolverines remained undefeated, and Steger had never played a game for a losing football team. In four years at Oak Park and two full seasons at Michigan (1922 and 1923), Steger's teams had not lost a single game. In the buildup to the 1924 game between Michigan and Red Grange's Illinois team, the press played up Steger's winning streak. The following excerpt typifies the coverage:

"In Captain Herbert Steger Michigan has something more than a dog-gone good halfback. It has a symbol of good fortune and victory. Steger is Michigan's rabbit's foot. In all the time he has been playing football he has yet to taste the unpalatable dregs of defeat. ... Steger was one of the best backs in the conferehce last year. But you can tell the wide world that Michigan is pinning part of its hopes for the Big Ten championship this season on the luck of its captain. He hasn't failed yet. When he meets Illinois and matches the old rabbit's foot against Red Grange's threats he will be subjecting his charmed football life to its severest strain."

His streak came to an end in the Illinois game on October 19, 1924. The game was the dedication game for the new Memorial Stadium in Urbana, Illinois. Grange took Steger's opening kickoff and ran it back 95 yards for a touchdown. Grange scored five touchdowns in the game and ran for 402 yards. After the game, Illini fans and player praised Steger for his sportsmanship and bravery in the game. Illini players reported that Steger had "arched his body over Grange while tackling him to prevent an injury to the man who blasted the hopes of Michigan."

Steger was the Wolverines' second leading scorer in 1924 with five touchdowns for 30 points. At the end of the 1924 season, Steger was selected as a third-team All-American by All-Sports Magazine, based on the combined vote of 312 prominent football coaches, officials and sport writers from all sections of the country, "representing the opinions of the best informed critics in all parts of the country."

=== Northwestern ===
In 1925, Steger accepted a position as an assistant coach at Northwestern where his former high school coach George Thistlewaite was the head football coach. After Northwestern tied Michigan for the 1926 Big Ten Conference football championship, the Athletic Board at Northwestern gave Steger a gold football as "a tribute to his coaching prowess." He served as a backfield coach for the Wildcats through the 1931 football season.

=== Later years ===
From 1931 to 1968, Steger worked as an insurance broker with offices at 175 West Jackson Boulevard in Chicago. He also worked as a Big Ten Conference football official from 1931 to 1953.

Steger died in July 1968 at his home on Chicago Avenue in Oak Park, Illinois. He was 66 years old at the time of his death and was survived by his wife, Bernice Steger, and a daughter, Judith Arado.
