= 1924 Wisconsin Badgers football team =

American college football season

1924 Wisconsin Badgers football
- Conference: Big Ten Conference
- Record: 2–3–3 (0–2–2 Big Ten)
- Head coach: John J. Ryan (2nd season)
- Captain: Jack Harris
- Home stadium: Camp Randall Stadium

1924 Big Ten Conference football standings
| | Conf. | | | | | Overall |
| Team | W | | L | | T | W | | L | | T |
|---|---|---|---|---|---|---|---|---|---|---|
| No. 11 Chicago $ | 3 | – | 0 | – | 3 | 4 | – | 1 | – | 3 |
| No. 4 Illinois | 3 | – | 1 | – | 1 | 6 | – | 1 | – | 1 |
| No. 6 Iowa | 3 | – | 1 | – | 1 | 6 | – | 1 | – | 1 |
| Michigan | 4 | – | 2 | – | 0 | 6 | – | 2 | – | 0 |
| Purdue | 2 | – | 2 | – | 0 | 5 | – | 2 | – | 0 |
| Minnesota | 1 | – | 2 | – | 1 | 3 | – | 3 | – | 2 |
| Ohio State | 1 | – | 3 | – | 2 | 2 | – | 3 | – | 3 |
| Indiana | 1 | – | 3 | – | 0 | 4 | – | 4 | – | 0 |
| Northwestern | 1 | – | 3 | – | 0 | 4 | – | 4 | – | 0 |
| Wisconsin | 0 | – | 2 | – | 2 | 2 | – | 3 | – | 3 |
$ – Conference champion; Rankings from Dickinson System

The 1924 Wisconsin Badgers football team was an American football team that represented the University of Wisconsin in the 1924 Big Ten Conference football season. The team compiled a 2–3–3 record (0–2–2 against conference opponents), finished in last place in the Big Ten Conference, and was outscored by opponents by a combined total of 94 to 66. John J. Ryan was in his second year as Wisconsin's head coach.

Jack Harris was the team captain. Guard Adolph Bieberstein was selected by All-Sports Magazine as a third-team player on its 1924 College Football All-America Team.

The team played its home games at Camp Randall Stadium, which had a seating capacity of 14,000. During the 1924 season, the average attendance at home games was 14,592.

== Schedule ==
| Date | Opponent | Site | Result | Attendance | Source |
|---|---|---|---|---|---|
| September 27 | North Dakota* | Camp Randall Stadium; Madison, WI | W 25–0 | | |
| October 4 | Iowa State* | Camp Randall Stadium; Madison, WI | W 17–0 | | |
| October 11 | Coe* | Camp Randall Stadium; Madison, WI | T 7–7 | | |
| October 18 | Minnesota | Camp Randall Stadium; Madison, WI (rivalry) | T 7–7 | 25,000 | |
| October 25 | at Michigan | Ferry Field; Ann Arbor, MI | L 0–21 | 44,000 | |
| November 8 | Notre Dame* | Camp Randall Stadium; Madison, WI | L 3–38 | 28,425 | |
| November 15 | Iowa^{†} | Camp Randall Stadium; Madison, WI (rivalry) | L 7–21 | | |
| November 22 | at Chicago | Stagg Field; Chicago, IL | T 0–0 | | |
*Non-conference game; ^{†}Homecoming
