= Bill Ingram =

American football player and coach (1898–1943)

Biographical details
- Born: June 14, 1898; Jeffersonville, Indiana, U.S.
- Died: June 2, 1943 (aged 44); Los Gatos, California, U.S.

Playing career
- 1916–1918: Navy

Coaching career (HC unless noted)
- 1922: William & Mary
- 1923–1925: Indiana
- 1926–1930: Navy
- 1931–1934: California

Head coaching record
- Overall: 75–42–9

Accomplishments and honors

Championships
- 1 national (1926)

Awards
- Second-team All-American (1917)
- College Football Hall of Fame; Inducted in 1973 (profile)

William Austin Ingram (June 14, 1898 – June 2, 1943) was an American college football player and coach. He served as the head football coach at The College of William & Mary (1922), Indiana University (1923–1925), the United States Naval Academy (1926–1930), and the University of California, Berkeley (1931–1934), compiling a career record of 75–42–9. Ingram's 1926 Navy team went 9–0–1 and was recognized as a national champion by the Boand System and the Houlgate System. Ingram was also known by the nickname "Navy Bill", due to his background at Annapolis. He died in his sleep while serving as a Major in the Marine Corps. He was inducted into the College Football Hall of Fame as a coach in 1973.

== Playing career ==
Ingram played quarterback for the Navy Midshipmen football team in 1916, 1917, and 1918. Ingram also was a stroke for the Navy rowing team during its 1918–19 season.

== Coaching career ==
From 1923 to 1925, he guided Indiana to a 10–12–1 record. At Navy he posted a 32–13–4 record. These totals included his 1926 team, which finished with a 9–0–1 record. He coached at California and won 27 games in four years. During the 1934 West Coast waterfront strike, Ingram organized his Cal players to work as strikebreakers.

== Head coaching record ==
Year	Team	Overall	Conference	Standing	Bowl/playoffs
William & Mary Indians (Independent) (1922)
1922	William & Mary	6–3			
William & Mary:		6–3			
Indiana Hoosiers (Big Ten Conference) (1923–1925)
1923	Indiana	3–4	2–2	T–5th	
1924	Indiana	4–4	1–3	7th	
1925	Indiana	3–4–1	0–3–1	T–9th	
Indiana:		10–12–1	3–8–1		
Navy Midshipmen (Independent) (1926–1930)
1926	Navy	9–0–1			
1927	Navy	6–3			
1928	Navy	5–3–1			
1929	Navy	6–2–2			
1930	Navy	6–5			
Navy:		32–13–4			
California Golden Bears (Pacific Coast Conference) (1931–1934)
1931	California	8–2	4–1	2nd	
1932	California	7–3–2	2–2–1	T–5th	
1933	California	6–3–2	2–2–2	6th	
1934	California	6–6	3–2	5th	
California:		27–14–4	11–7–3		
Total:		75–42–9			
National championship Conference title Conference division title or championship game berth
