= Dutch Marion =

American football player (1902–1985)

Phillip Eugene Marion
Profile
- Position: Fullback

Personal information
- Born: June 18, 1902; Chicago, Illinois, U.S.
- Died: June 1985 (aged 83); Dearborn, Michigan, U.S.
- Listed height: 5 ft 9 in (1.75 m)
- Listed weight: 180 lb (82 kg)

Career information
- College: Washington & Jefferson College, University of Michigan

Career history
- Detroit Panthers (1925–1926)
- Stats at Pro Football Reference

Phillip Eugene "Dutch" Marion (June 18, 1902 – June 1985) was an American professional football player for the Detroit Panthers. He attended Washington & Jefferson College and University of Michigan.
