= 1924 Northwestern Wildcats football team =

American college football season

1924 Northwestern Wildcats football
- Conference: Big Ten Conference
- Record: 4–4 (1–3 Big Ten)
- Head coach: Glenn Thistlethwaite (3rd season)
- Captain: Robert Wienecke
- Home stadium: Northwestern Field

Uniform
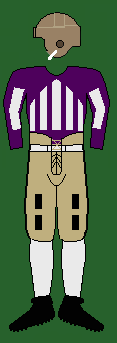

1924 Big Ten Conference football standings
	Conf.					Overall
Team	W		L		T	W		L		T
No. 11 Chicago $	3	–	0	–	3	4	–	1	–	3
No. 4 Illinois	3	–	1	–	1	6	–	1	–	1
No. 6 Iowa	3	–	1	–	1	6	–	1	–	1
Michigan	4	–	2	–	0	6	–	2	–	0
Purdue	2	–	2	–	0	5	–	2	–	0
Minnesota	1	–	2	–	1	3	–	3	–	2
Ohio State	1	–	3	–	2	2	–	3	–	3
Indiana	1	–	3	–	0	4	–	4	–	0
Northwestern	1	–	3	–	0	4	–	4	–	0
Wisconsin	0	–	2	–	2	2	–	3	–	3
$ – Conference champion; Rankings from Dickinson System

The 1924 Northwestern Wildcats team represented Northwestern University during the 1924 Big Ten Conference football season. In their third year under head coach Glenn Thistlethwaite, the Wildcats compiled a 4–4 record (1–3 against Big Ten Conference opponents) and finished in a tie for eighth place in the Big Ten Conference.

== Schedule ==
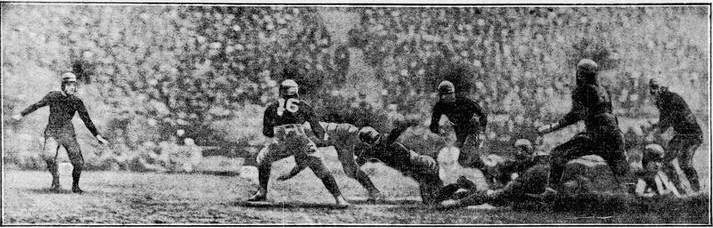
Game against Notre Dame at Grant Park Memorial Stadium (today's Soldier Field) on November 22, 1924

Date	Opponent	Site	Result	Attendance	Source
October 4	South Dakota*	Northwestern Field; Evanston, IL	W 28–0		
October 11	Cincinnati*	Northwestern Field; Evanston, IL	W 42–0		
October 18	Purdue	Northwestern Field; Evanston, IL	L 3–7		
October 25	Michigan Agricultural*	Northwestern Field; Evanston, IL	W 13–9		
November 1	Indiana	Northwestern Field; Evanston, IL	W 17–7		
November 8	at Michigan	Ferry Field; Ann Arbor, MI (rivalry)	L 0–27	30,000	
November 15	at Chicago	Stagg Field; Chicago, IL	L 0–3		
November 22	vs. Notre Dame*	Soldier Field; Chicago, IL (rivalry)	L 6–13	35,000	
*Non-conference game
