= 1924 Ohio State Buckeyes football team =

American college football season

1924 Ohio State Buckeyes football
- Conference: Big Ten Conference
- Record: 2–3–3 (1–3–2 Big Ten)
- Head coach: John Wilce (12th season)
- Captain: Frank D. Young
- Home stadium: Ohio Stadium

1924 Big Ten Conference football standings
	Conf.					Overall
Team	W		L		T	W		L		T
No. 11 Chicago $	3	–	0	–	3	4	–	1	–	3
No. 4 Illinois	3	–	1	–	1	6	–	1	–	1
No. 6 Iowa	3	–	1	–	1	6	–	1	–	1
Michigan	4	–	2	–	0	6	–	2	–	0
Purdue	2	–	2	–	0	5	–	2	–	0
Minnesota	1	–	2	–	1	3	–	3	–	2
Ohio State	1	–	3	–	2	2	–	3	–	3
Indiana	1	–	3	–	0	4	–	4	–	0
Northwestern	1	–	3	–	0	4	–	4	–	0
Wisconsin	0	–	2	–	2	2	–	3	–	3
$ – Conference champion; Rankings from Dickinson System

The 1924 Ohio State Buckeyes football team represented Ohio State University in the 1924 Big Ten Conference football season. The Buckeyes compiled a 2–3–3 record and were outscored 40–45 by their opponent.

== Schedule ==
Date	Opponent	Site	Result	Attendance	Source
October 4	Purdue	Ohio Stadium; Columbus, OH	W 7–0		
October 11	at Iowa	Iowa Field; Iowa City, IA	T 0–0	25,000	
October 18	Ohio Wesleyan*	Ohio Stadium; Columbus, OH	W 10–0	25,000	
October 25	Chicago	Ohio Stadium; Columbus, OH	T 3–3	40,000	
November 1	Wooster*	Ohio Stadium; Columbus, OH	T 7–7	17,243	
November 8	Indiana	Ohio Stadium; Columbus, OH	L 7–12	20,000	
November 15	Michigan	Ohio Stadium; Columbus, OH (rivalry)	L 6–16	70,000	
November 22	at Illinois	Memorial Stadium; Champaign, IL (rivalry)	L 0–7	27,378	
*Non-conference game

== Coaching staff ==
- John Wilce, head coach, 12th year
