= 1927 Big Ten Conference football season =

1928 Big Ten Conference football season
- Sport: Football
- Teams: 10
- Champion: Illinois
- Runners-up: Minnesota
- Season MVP: Ken Rouse

Football seasons
- 1926 1928

1927 Big Ten Conference football standings
	Conf.					Overall
Team	W		L		T	W		L		T
No. 1 Illinois +	5	–	0	–	0	7	–	0	–	1
No. 3 Minnesota +	3	–	0	–	1	6	–	0	–	2
No. 7 Michigan	3	–	2	–	0	6	–	2	–	0
Chicago	3	–	3	–	0	4	–	4	–	0
Purdue	2	–	2	–	0	6	–	2	–	0
Northwestern	2	–	3	–	0	4	–	4	–	0
Ohio State	2	–	3	–	0	4	–	4	–	0
Indiana	1	–	2	–	1	3	–	4	–	1
Iowa	1	–	4	–	0	4	–	4	–	0
Wisconsin	1	–	4	–	0	4	–	4	–	0
+ – Conference co-champions; Rankings from Dickinson System

Chicago Tribune coverage of the 1927 Big Ten football season and All-Conference team selections, published on November 27, 1927.

The 1927 Big Ten Conference football season was the 32nd season of college football played by the member schools of the Big Ten Conference (also known as the Western Conference) and was a part of the 1927 college football season.

The 1927 Illinois Fighting Illini football team, under head coach Robert Zuppke, compiled a 7–0–1 record, won the Big Ten championship, led the conference in scoring defense (3.0 points allowed per game), and was recognized as the national champion under the Dickinson System rankings. Guard Russ Crane and center Robert Reitsch received first-team All-American honors.

The 1927 Minnesota Golden Gophers football team, under head coach Clarence Spears, compiled a 6–0–2 record, led the Big Ten in scoring offense (26.1 points per game), and was ranked No. 3 in the Dickinson System rankings. Fullback Herb Joesting was a consensus first-team All-American, and guard Harold Hanson also received first-team All-American honors from multiple selectors.

The 1927 Michigan Wolverines football team, under head coach Tad Wieman, compiled a 6–2 record, shut out its first four opponents, and was ranked No. 7 in the Dickinson System rankings. Michigan end Bennie Oosterbaan was a consensus first-team All-American for the third consecutive year. Halfback Louis Gilbert was Michigan's leading scorer and a first-team All-Big Ten player.

Chicago center Ken Rouse received the Chicago Tribune Silver Football trophy as the most valuable player in the conference.

== Season overview ==
=== Results and team statistics ===
Conf. Rank	Team	Head coach	Overall record	Conf. record	DS rank	PPG	PAG
1	Illinois	Robert Zuppke	7–0–1	5–0	#1	19.0	3.0
2	Minnesota	Clarence Spears	6–0–2	3–0–1	#3	26.1	6.4
3	Michigan	Tad Wieman	6–2	3–2	#7	17.1	4.9
4	Chicago	Amos Alonzo Stagg	4–4	3–3	NR	8.1	8.5
5	Purdue	Jimmy Phelan	6–2	2–2	NR	21.3	4.8
6 (tie)	Northwestern	Dick Hanley	4–4	2–3	NR	16.1	12.3
6 (tie)	Ohio State	John Wilce	4–4	2–3	NR	16.4	11.5
8	Indiana	Harlan Page	3–4–1	1–2–1	NR	13.0	13.4
9 (tie)	Iowa	Burt Ingwersen	4–4	1–4	NR	13.4	10.4
9 (tie)	Wisconsin	Glenn Thistlethwaite	4–4	1–4	NR	12.0	9.4

Key
DS = Rankings from Dickinson System. See 1927 college football season
PPG = Average of points scored per game
PAG = Average of points allowed per game

== Schedule ==
=== Week one ===
Date	Time	Visiting team	Home team	Site	TV	Result	Attendance	Ref.
October 1		Oklahoma	Chicago	Stagg Field • Chicago, IL		L 7–13	25,000	
^{#}Rankings from AP Poll released prior to game.

=== Week two ===
Date	Time	Visiting team	Home team	Site	TV	Result	Attendance	Ref.
October 8		Oklahoma A&M	Minnesota	Memorial Stadium • Minneapolis, MN		W 40–0	35,000	
^{#}Rankings from AP Poll released prior to game.

=== Bowl games ===
No Big Ten teams participated in any bowl games during the 1927 season.

== All-Big Ten players ==
The following players were picked by the Associated Press (AP), the United Press (UP), the Chicago Daily News (CDN), and/or Walter Eckersall (WE) as first-team players on the 1927 All-Big Ten Conference football team.

Position	Name	Team	Selectors
Quarterback	Harold "Shorty" Almquist	Minnesota	AP [halfback], CDN, UP, WE
Quarterback	Edwin Crofoot	Wisconsin	AP
Halfback	Louis Gilbert	Michigan	AP, CDN, UP, WE
Halfback	Jud Timm	Illinois	CDN, UP, WE
Fullback	Herb Joesting	Minnesota	AP, CDN, UP, WE
End	Bennie Oosterbaan	Michigan	AP, CDN, UP, WE
End	Waldo A. Fisher	Northwestern	AP, CDN, UP
End	Ken Haycraft	Minnesota	WE
Tackle	Leo Raskowski	Ohio State	AP, CDN, UP, WE
Tackle	Albert J. Nowack	Illinois	AP, CDN, WE
Tackle	Mike Gary	Minnesota	UP
Guard	Ray Baer	Michigan	AP, CDN, UP, WE
Guard	Harold W. Hanson	Minnesota	AP
Guard	John R. Matthews	Indiana	WE
Guard	Justin Whitlock Dart	Northwestern	CDN
Center	Ken Rouse	Chicago	AP, CDN, UP, WE
Center	Robert Reitsch	Illinois	UP

== All-Americans ==
Two Big Ten players were selected as consensus first-team players on the 1927 College Football All-America Team. They were:

Position	Name	Team	Selectors
End	Bennie Oosterbaan	Michigan	AAB, AP, CO, INS, NANA, NEA, UP, CP, CEP, HE, NYS BE, LP, WE
Fullback	Herb Joesting	Minnesota	AAB, AP, CO, INS, NEA, UP, CP, HE, NYS, BE, LP, WE

Other Big Ten players received first-team honors from at least one selector. They were:

Position	Name	Team	Selectors
Tackle	Leo Raskowski	Ohio State	COL, NEA, BE, CEP, LP, WE
Guard	Harold Hanson	Minnesota	UP, NANA, CEP, LP
Guard	Russ Crane	Illinois	COL
Center	Robert Reitsch	Illinois	NANA, LP
