= 1927 Minnesota Golden Gophers football team =

American college football season

1927 Minnesota Golden Gophers football

Big Ten co-champion
- Conference: Big Ten Conference
- Record: 6–0–2 (3–0–1 Big Ten)
- Head coach: Clarence Spears (3rd season)
- Captain: Herb Joesting
- Home stadium: Memorial Stadium

1927 Big Ten Conference football standings
	Conf.					Overall
Team	W		L		T	W		L		T
No. 1 Illinois +	5	–	0	–	0	7	–	0	–	1
No. 3 Minnesota +	3	–	0	–	1	6	–	0	–	2
No. 7 Michigan	3	–	2	–	0	6	–	2	–	0
Chicago	3	–	3	–	0	4	–	4	–	0
Purdue	2	–	2	–	0	6	–	2	–	0
Northwestern	2	–	3	–	0	4	–	4	–	0
Ohio State	2	–	3	–	0	4	–	4	–	0
Indiana	1	–	2	–	1	3	–	4	–	1
Iowa	1	–	4	–	0	4	–	4	–	0
Wisconsin	1	–	4	–	0	4	–	4	–	0
+ – Conference co-champions; Rankings from Dickinson System

The 1927 Minnesota Golden Gophers football team represented the University of Minnesota in the 1927 Big Ten Conference football season. In their third year under head coach Clarence Spears, the Golden Gophers compiled a 6–0–2 record and outscored their opponents by a combined score of 209 to 51. The Gophers shared the Big Ten title, the ninth in school history. The team was ranked No. 3 in the nation in the Dickinson System ratings released in December 1927.

Fullback Herb Joesting and guard Harold Hanson were named All-American status. Joesting, Hanson, quarterback Harold "Shorty" Almquist, tackle Mike Gary and end Ken Haycraft were named All-Big Ten first team.

Total attendance for the season was 166,848, which averaged to 23,126. The season high for attendance was against Wisconsin.

== Schedule ==
Date	Opponent	Site	Result	Attendance	Source
October 1	North Dakota*	Memorial Stadium; Minneapolis, MN	W 57–10	22,000	
October 8	Oklahoma A&M*	Memorial Stadium; Minneapolis, MN	W 40–0	35,000	
October 15	at Indiana	Memorial Stadium; Bloomington, IN	T 14–14	21,000	
October 22	Iowa^{†}	Memorial Stadium; Minneapolis, MN (rivalry)	W 38–0	52,000	
October 29	Wisconsin	Memorial Stadium; Minneapolis, MN (rivalry)	W 13–7	56,000	
November 5	at Notre Dame*	Cartier Field; Notre Dame, IN	T 7–7	26,000	
November 12	Drake*	Memorial Stadium; Minneapolis, MN	W 27–6	18,000	
November 19	at Michigan	Michigan Stadium; Ann Arbor, MI (Little Brown Jug)	W 13–7	84,243	
*Non-conference game; ^{†}Homecoming

== Game summaries ==
=== Michigan ===
Week 8: Minnesota at Michigan

Team	1	2	3	4	Total
• Minnesota	0	0	6	7	13
Michigan	7	0	0	0	7

- Date: November 19, 1927
- Location: Michigan Stadium
  Ann Arbor, MI
- Referee: Walter Eckersall (Chicago)

On November 19, 1927, Minnesota defeated Michigan by a 13-7 score at Michigan Stadium. Bennie Oosterbaan scored Michigan's touchdown in the first quarter on a long forward pass from halfback William Puckelwartz, and Louis Gilbert kicked the point after touchdown. Minnesota came from behind with 13 points in the second half on touchdown runs by Herb Joesting and a touchdown pass from Harold "Shorty" Almquist to Haycraft. Minnesota had 15 first downs in the game while Michigan had only two. Minnesota's victory was its first over Michigan since 1919. The game was also the Michigan's first defeat at Michigan Stadium and the final college football game for Michigan stars Oosterbaan and Gilbert and for Minnesota stars Joesting and Almquist. Walter Eckersall served as the game's referee and wrote in the Chicago Tribune: "For hard, aggressive playing combined with splendid sportsmanship it was one of the best struggles I ever officiated in."
