= 1927 Chicago Maroons football team =

American college football season

1927 Chicago Maroons football
- Conference: Big Ten Conference
- Record: 4–4 (3–3 Big Ten)
- Head coach: Amos Alonzo Stagg (36th season)
- Home stadium: Stagg Field

1927 Big Ten Conference football standings
| | Conf. | | | | | Overall |
| Team | W | | L | | T | W | | L | | T |
|---|---|---|---|---|---|---|---|---|---|---|
| No. 1 Illinois + | 5 | – | 0 | – | 0 | 7 | – | 0 | – | 1 |
| No. 3 Minnesota + | 3 | – | 0 | – | 1 | 6 | – | 0 | – | 2 |
| No. 7 Michigan | 3 | – | 2 | – | 0 | 6 | – | 2 | – | 0 |
| Chicago | 3 | – | 3 | – | 0 | 4 | – | 4 | – | 0 |
| Purdue | 2 | – | 2 | – | 0 | 6 | – | 2 | – | 0 |
| Northwestern | 2 | – | 3 | – | 0 | 4 | – | 4 | – | 0 |
| Ohio State | 2 | – | 3 | – | 0 | 4 | – | 4 | – | 0 |
| Indiana | 1 | – | 2 | – | 1 | 3 | – | 4 | – | 1 |
| Iowa | 1 | – | 4 | – | 0 | 4 | – | 4 | – | 0 |
| Wisconsin | 1 | – | 4 | – | 0 | 4 | – | 4 | – | 0 |
+ – Conference co-champions; Rankings from Dickinson System

The 1927 Chicago Maroons football team was an American football team that represented the University of Chicago during the 1927 Big Ten Conference football season. In their 36th season under head coach Amos Alonzo Stagg, the Maroons compiled a 4–4 record, finished fourth in the Big Ten Conference, and were outscored by their opponents by a combined total of 68 to 65.

Fritz Crisler was an assistant coach on the team.

== Schedule ==
| Date | Opponent | Site | Result | Attendance | Source |
|---|---|---|---|---|---|
| October 1 | Oklahoma* | Stagg Field; Chicago, IL | L 7–13 | 25,000 | |
| October 8 | Indiana | Stagg Field; Chicago, IL | W 13–0 | 35,000 | |
| October 15 | Purdue | Stagg Field; Chicago, IL (rivalry) | W 7–6 | 55,000 | |
| October 22 | Penn* | Stagg Field; Chicago, IL | W 13–7 | 45,000 | |
| October 29 | at Ohio State | Ohio Stadium; Columbus OH | L 7–13 | 35,775-40,000 | |
| November 5 | Michigan | Stagg Field; Chicago, IL (rivalry) | L 0–14 | 53,042-60,000 | |
| November 12 | at Illinois | Memorial Stadium; Champaign, IL | L 6–15 | 48,000 | |
| November 19 | Wisconsin | Stagg Field; Chicago, IL | W 12–0 | 45,000 | |
*Non-conference game
