= Jack Hutton =

American football player (1906–1969)

Profile
- Positions: End, halfback

Personal information
- Born: August 12, 1906; Indianapolis, Indiana, U.S.
- Died: January 2, 1969 (aged 62); Bristol, Pennsylvania, U.S.
- Listed height: 6 ft 1 in (1.85 m)
- Listed weight: 192 lb (87 kg)

Career information
- High school: Emmerich Manual Training (IN)
- College: Purdue

Career history
- Frankford Yellow Jackets (1930)

Awards and highlights
- Second-team All-Big Ten (1928)
- Stats at Pro Football Reference

Leon John H. Hutton (August 12, 1906 – January 2, 1969) was an American football player.

Hutton was born in 1906 in Indianapolis. He attended Emmerich Manual High School in Indianapolis and Purdue University. He played college football for the Purdue Boilermakers football team from 1926 to 1928. At the end of the 1928 season, he received first-team honors on the Indiana all-state football team. He also served in the United States Navy.

Hutton also played professional football in the National Football League (NFL) as an end and halfback for the Frankford Yellow Jackets in 1930. He appeared in three NFL games, two as a starter.

After his football career ended, Hutton had a career in business. He was the president of Hutton Chevrolet Co. in Riverside, New Jersey and a director of the Bank of West Jersey and the Central New Jersey AAA. He also served as chairman of the Bucks County Board of Assessment from 1962 to 1967. He died in 1969 in Bristol, Pennsylvania.
