= 1927 Northwestern Wildcats football team =

American college football season

1927 Northwestern Wildcats football
- Conference: Big Ten Conference
- Record: 4–4 (2–3 Big Ten)
- Head coach: Dick Hanley (1st season)
- Captain: Vic Gustafson
- Home stadium: Dyche Stadium

1927 Big Ten Conference football standings
	Conf.					Overall
Team	W		L		T	W		L		T
No. 1 Illinois +	5	–	0	–	0	7	–	0	–	1
No. 3 Minnesota +	3	–	0	–	1	6	–	0	–	2
No. 7 Michigan	3	–	2	–	0	6	–	2	–	0
Chicago	3	–	3	–	0	4	–	4	–	0
Purdue	2	–	2	–	0	6	–	2	–	0
Northwestern	2	–	3	–	0	4	–	4	–	0
Ohio State	2	–	3	–	0	4	–	4	–	0
Indiana	1	–	2	–	1	3	–	4	–	1
Iowa	1	–	4	–	0	4	–	4	–	0
Wisconsin	1	–	4	–	0	4	–	4	–	0
+ – Conference co-champions; Rankings from Dickinson System

The 1927 Northwestern Wildcats team represented Northwestern University during the 1927 Big Ten Conference football season. In their first year under head coach Dick Hanley, the Wildcats compiled a 4–4 record (2–3 against Big Ten Conference opponents) and finished in a tie for sixth place in the Big Ten Conference.

== Schedule ==
Date	Opponent	Site	Result	Attendance	Source
October 1	South Dakota*	Dyche Stadium; Evanston, IL	W 47–2	25,000	
October 8	Utah*	Dyche Stadium; Evanston, IL	W 13–6		
October 15	at Ohio State	Ohio Stadium; Columbus, OH	W 19–13	42,614	
October 22	Illinois	Dyche Stadium; Evanston, IL (rivalry)	L 6–7	50,000	
October 29	Missouri*	Dyche Stadium; Evanston, IL	L 19–34		
November 5	at Purdue	Ross–Ade Stadium; West Lafayette, IN	L 6–18		
November 12	Indiana	Dyche Stadium; Evanston, IL	L 7–18		
November 19	Iowa	Dyche Stadium; Evanston, IL	W 12–0		
*Non-conference game

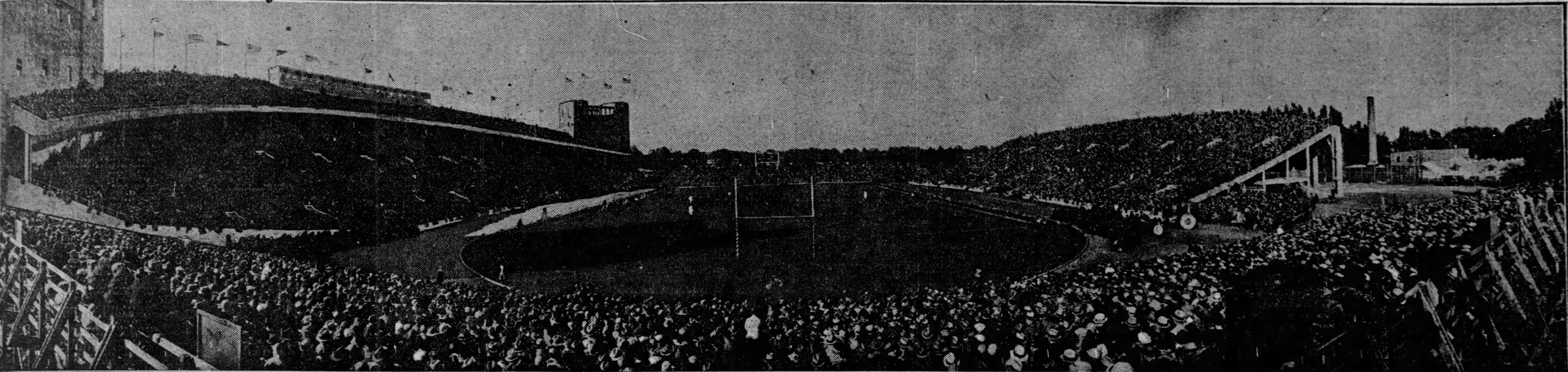
Northwestern face the Illinois Fighting Illini in a home game at Dyche Stadium
