= 1927 Iowa Hawkeyes football team =

American college football season

1927 Iowa Hawkeyes football
- Conference: Big Ten Conference
- Record: 4–4 (1–4 Big Ten)
- Head coach: Burt Ingwersen (4th season)
- MVP: Emerson Nelson
- Captain: Emerson Nelson
- Home stadium: Iowa Field

1927 Big Ten Conference football standings
	Conf.					Overall
Team	W		L		T	W		L		T
No. 1 Illinois +	5	–	0	–	0	7	–	0	–	1
No. 3 Minnesota +	3	–	0	–	1	6	–	0	–	2
No. 7 Michigan	3	–	2	–	0	6	–	2	–	0
Chicago	3	–	3	–	0	4	–	4	–	0
Purdue	2	–	2	–	0	6	–	2	–	0
Northwestern	2	–	3	–	0	4	–	4	–	0
Ohio State	2	–	3	–	0	4	–	4	–	0
Indiana	1	–	2	–	1	3	–	4	–	1
Iowa	1	–	4	–	0	4	–	4	–	0
Wisconsin	1	–	4	–	0	4	–	4	–	0
+ – Conference co-champions; Rankings from Dickinson System

The 1927 Iowa Hawkeyes football team was an American football team represented the University of Iowa as a member of the Big Ten Conference during the 1927 Big Ten football season. In their fourth year under head coach Burt Ingwersen, the Hawkeyes compiled a 4–4 record (1–4 in conference games), tied for last place in the Big Ten, and outscored opponents by a total of 107 to 83.

The team played its home games at Iowa Field in Iowa City, Iowa.

== Schedule ==
Date	Opponent	Site	Result	Attendance	Source
October 1	Monmouth (IL)*	Iowa Field; Iowa City, IA	W 32–6		
October 8	Ohio State	Iowa Field; Iowa City, IA	L 6–13	15,000	
October 15	Wabash*	Iowa Field; Iowa City, IA	W 38–0		
October 22	at Minnesota	Memorial Stadium; Minneapolis, MN (rivalry)	L 0–38	52,000	
October 29	Denver*	Iowa Field; Iowa City, IA	W 15–0		
November 5	Illinois^{†}	Iowa Field; Iowa City, IA	L 0–14	22,000	
November 12	at Wisconsin	Camp Randall Stadium; Madison, WI (rivalry)	W 16–0		
November 19	at Northwestern	Dyche Stadium; Evanston, IL	L 0–12		
*Non-conference game; ^{†}Homecoming
