= 1927 Purdue Boilermakers football team =

American college football season

1927 Purdue Boilermakers football
- Conference: Big Ten Conference
- Record: 6–2 (2–2 Big Ten)
- Head coach: James Phelan (6th season)
- Captain: Chester "Cotton" Wilcox
- Home stadium: Ross–Ade Stadium

1927 Big Ten Conference football standings
	Conf.					Overall
Team	W		L		T	W		L		T
No. 1 Illinois +	5	–	0	–	0	7	–	0	–	1
No. 3 Minnesota +	3	–	0	–	1	6	–	0	–	2
No. 7 Michigan	3	–	2	–	0	6	–	2	–	0
Chicago	3	–	3	–	0	4	–	4	–	0
Purdue	2	–	2	–	0	6	–	2	–	0
Northwestern	2	–	3	–	0	4	–	4	–	0
Ohio State	2	–	3	–	0	4	–	4	–	0
Indiana	1	–	2	–	1	3	–	4	–	1
Iowa	1	–	4	–	0	4	–	4	–	0
Wisconsin	1	–	4	–	0	4	–	4	–	0
+ – Conference co-champions; Rankings from Dickinson System

The 1927 Purdue Boilermakers football team was an American football team that represented Purdue University during the 1927 Big Ten Conference football season. In their sixth season under head coach James Phelan, the Boilermakers compiled a 6–2 record, finished in fifth place in the Big Ten Conference with a 2–2 record against conference opponents, and outscored opponents by a total of 170 to 38. Chester "Cotton" Wilcox was the team captain.

== Schedule ==
Date	Opponent	Site	Result	Attendance	Source
October 1	DePauw*	Ross–Ade Stadium; West Lafayette, IN	W 15–0		
October 8	at Harvard*	Harvard Stadium; Boston, MA	W 19–0	25,000	
October 15	at Chicago	Stagg Field; Chicago, IL (rivalry)	L 6–7	55,000	
October 22	at Wisconsin	Camp Randall Stadium; Madison, WI	L 6–12	15,000	
October 29	Montana State*	Ross–Ade Stadium; West Lafayette, IN	W 39–7	7,000	
November 5	Northwestern	Ross–Ade Stadium; West Lafayette, IN	W 18–6	15,000	
November 12	Franklin*	Ross–Ade Stadium; West Lafayette, IN	W 46–0		
November 19	at Indiana	Memorial Stadium; Bloomington, IN (Old Oaken Bucket)	W 21–6	26,000	
*Non-conference game

== Roster ==
- George Boots, E-G
- Don Cameron, T
- Elbert Caraway, HB
- Joe Dellinger, T
- Burt Dreyer, C
- Edwin Eickmann, T
- Herb Galletch, T
- Sigmund Greicus, G
- Al Guthrie, HB
- Glen Harmeson, QB
- Calvin Hill, G
- A. F. Hook, G
- Leon Hutton, E
- Abraham Koranksy, FB
- Sylvan Leichtle, RH
- Red Mackey, E
- William Miller, FB
- Harvey Olson, C
- George Prentice, G
- L. R. Sindelar, E
- Elmer Sleight, T
- John Stillwell, E
- Claude Urevig, T
- Ralph Welch, HB
- Chester Wilcox, HB
- Robert Wilson, QB
- Bill Woerner, E
