= Butch Nowack =

American football player and coach (1904–1952)

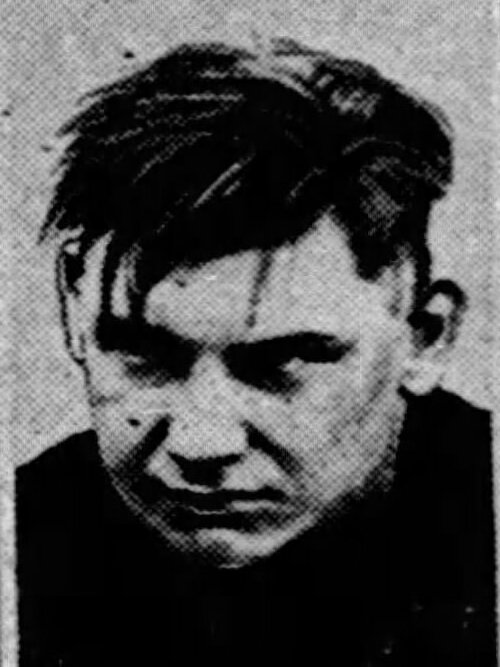
- Nowak circa 1927

Biographical details
- Born: 1904
- Died: August 28, 1952 (aged 48); Rochester, Minnesota, U.S.

Playing career
- 1926–1928: Illinois
- Position: Tackle

Coaching career (HC unless noted)
- 1929–1930: Central Michigan
- 1931–1933: Indiana (line)
- 1935–1952: LaSalle-Peru HS (IL)

Head coaching record
- Overall: 8–5–2 (college)

Accomplishments and honors

Championships
- National (1927)

Awards
- First-team All-American (1928); First-team All-Big Ten (1928)

Albert J. "Butch" Nowack (1904 – September 28, 1952) was an American football player and coach.

A native of Pana, Illinois, he played college football as a tackle at the University of Illinois under Robert Zuppke and was a member of the 1927 Illinois Fighting Illini football team that won the national championship and captain of the 1928 team that won the Big Ten Conference championship. He was selected as a first-team player on the 1927 and 1928 All-Big Ten Conference football teams. He was also selected by the All-America Board and the North American Newspaper Alliance as a first-team player on the 1928 College Football All-America Team.

He was the head coach of the Central State Teachers College football team in 1929 and 1930. In April 1931, he was hired as an assistant football coach under Earl C. Hayes at Indiana University. He served as Indiana's line coach for the 1931, 1932, and 1933 seasons. In June 1935, he was hired as the head football coach at LaSalle-Peru High School in Illinois. He served in that position for 17 years.

Nowack was unmarried. He died in 1952 at age 48 while undergoing treatment for throat cancer at the Mayo Clinic in Rochester, Minnesota. He was buried at Mound Cemetery in Pana, Illinois.

== Head coaching record ==
=== College ===
| Year | Team | Overall | Conference | Standing | Bowl/playoffs |
|---|---|---|---|---|---|
Central State Bearcats (Michigan Collegiate Conference) (1929–1930)
| 1929 | Central State | 2–3–2 | 0–3 | 4th | |
| 1930 | Central State | 6–2 | 1–2 | 3rd | |
| Central Michigan: | | 8–5–2 | 1–5 | | |
| Total: | | 8–5–2 | | | |
