= Jud Timm =

American football player and coach (1906–1994)

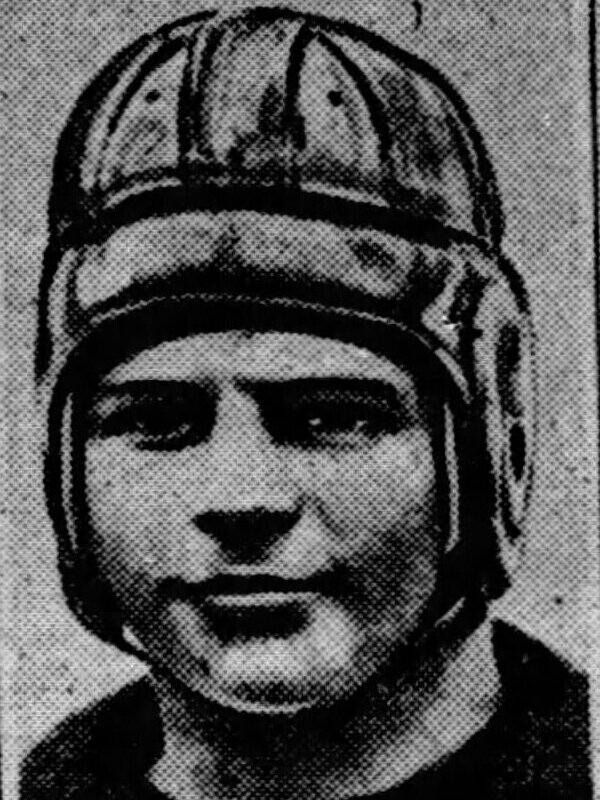
- Timm circa 1927

Biographical details
- Born: August 28, 1906; Michigan, U.S.
- Died: December 23, 1994 (aged 88); Trenton, New Jersey, U.S.

Playing career

Football
- 1926–1929: Illinois
- Position: Halfback

Coaching career (HC unless noted)

Football
- 1930–1938: Pennsylvania Military
- 1939–1941: Moravian
- 1942–1944: Yale (backfield)
- 1945–?: Princeton (backfield)

Basketball
- 1930–1936: Pennsylvania Military
- 1937–1938: Pennsylvania Military

Track and field
- 1942–1947: Princeton (indoor)
- 1944–1947: Princeton (outdoor)

Head coaching record
- Overall: 52–43–11 (football); 58–54 (basketball)

Accomplishments and honors

Awards
- First-team All-Big Ten (1927)

Judson Albert Timm (August 28, 1906 – December 23, 1994) was a college football player and coach. A native of Twin Falls, Idaho, he played for Robert Zuppke's Illinois Fighting Illini football teams at the University of Illinois, where he was a prominent halfback and a member of its 1927 national championship team. Timm scored in the Michigan game that year; and was an All-Big Ten Conference selection. Timm served as the head football coach at Pennsylvania Military College—now known as Widener University—from 1930 to 1938 and at Moravian College from 1939 to 1941, compiling a career college football coaching record of 52–43–11. He was also the head basketball coach at Pennsylvania Military from 1930 to 1936 and again in 1937–38, tallying a mark of 58–54. Timm was an assistant football coach at Yale University from 1942 to 1944, mentoring the backfield for the Yale Bulldogs football team under head coach Howard Odell. He was later an assistant football coach and head track and field coach at Princeton University.

== Early years ==
Timm was born on August 28, 1906, in Michigan to Albert Amos Timm and Gertrude Wolfinger.

== Head coaching record ==
=== Football ===
Year	Team	Overall	Conference	Standing	Bowl/playoffs
Pennsylvania Military Cadets (Independent) (1930–1938)
1930	Pennsylvania Military	6–3–1			
1931	Pennsylvania Military	4–3–2			
1932	Pennsylvania Military	3–4–2			
1933	Pennsylvania Military	5–2–1			
1934	Pennsylvania Military	7–0–2			
1935	Pennsylvania Military	5–5			
1936	Pennsylvania Military	2–7			
1937	Pennsylvania Military	1–8–1			
1938	Pennsylvania Military	3–5–1			
Pennsylvania Military:		36–37–10			
Moravian Greyhounds (Independent) (1939–1941)
1939	Moravian	4–3–1			
1940	Moravian	6–1			
1941	Moravian	6–2			
Moravian:		16–6–1			
Total:		52–43–11			
