= 1927 Illinois Fighting Illini football team =

American college football season

1927 Illinois Fighting Illini football
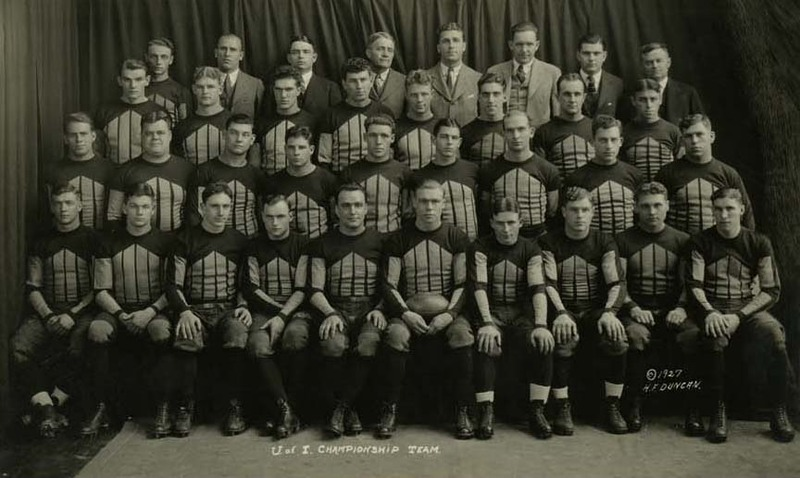

National champion (Billingsley, Dickinson, Helms, NCF, Davis) Big Ten co-champion
- Conference: Big Ten Conference
- Record: 7–0–1 (5–0 Big Ten)
- Head coach: Robert Zuppke (15th season)
- Offensive scheme: Single-wing
- Captain: Robert Reitsch
- Home stadium: Memorial Stadium

Uniform
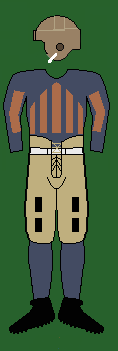

1927 Big Ten Conference football standings
	Conf.					Overall
Team	W		L		T	W		L		T
No. 1 Illinois +	5	–	0	–	0	7	–	0	–	1
No. 3 Minnesota +	3	–	0	–	1	6	–	0	–	2
No. 7 Michigan	3	–	2	–	0	6	–	2	–	0
Chicago	3	–	3	–	0	4	–	4	–	0
Purdue	2	–	2	–	0	6	–	2	–	0
Northwestern	2	–	3	–	0	4	–	4	–	0
Ohio State	2	–	3	–	0	4	–	4	–	0
Indiana	1	–	2	–	1	3	–	4	–	1
Iowa	1	–	4	–	0	4	–	4	–	0
Wisconsin	1	–	4	–	0	4	–	4	–	0
+ – Conference co-champions; Rankings from Dickinson System

The 1927 Illinois Fighting Illini football team was an American football team that represented the University of Illinois in the 1927 Big Ten Conference football season. The Fighting Illini compiled a 7–0–1 record (5–0 against Western Conference opponents) and outscored their opponents by a combined total of 152 to 24.

Illinois was also ranked No. 1 in the nation in the Dickinson System ratings released in December 1927. Illinois was also retroactively named as the national champion for 1927 by the Billingsley Report, Helms Athletic Foundation, National Championship Foundation, and Parke H. Davis.

Center Robert Reitsch and guard Russ Crane were selected as first-team players on the 1927 All-America college football team: Reitsch by the North American Newspaper Alliance and Lawrence Perry; and Crane by Grantland Rice for Collier's Weekly. Reitsch was also the team captain. Other notable players included halfback Jud Timm; end Garland Grange; and tackle Butch Nowack.

== Schedule ==
Date	Opponent	Site	Result	Attendance	Source
October 1	Bradley*	Memorial Stadium; Champaign, IL	W 19–0	9,000–16,987	
October 8	Butler*	Memorial Stadium; Champaign, IL	W 58–0	10,000–10,742	
October 15	Iowa State*	Memorial Stadium; Champaign, IL	T 12–12	11,211–12,000	
October 22	at Northwestern	Dyche Stadium; Evanston, IL (rivalry)	W 7–6	46,580–50,000	
October 29	Michigan^{†}	Memorial Stadium; Champaign, IL (rivalry)	W 14–0	62,000–63,101	
November 5	at Iowa	Iowa Field; Iowa City, IA	W 14–0	22,000	
November 12	Chicago	Memorial Stadium; Champaign, IL	W 15–6	48,000–48,012	
November 19	at Ohio State	Ohio Stadium; Columbus, OH (Illibuck)	W 13–0	70,000–70,034	
*Non-conference game; ^{†}Homecoming

== Roster ==
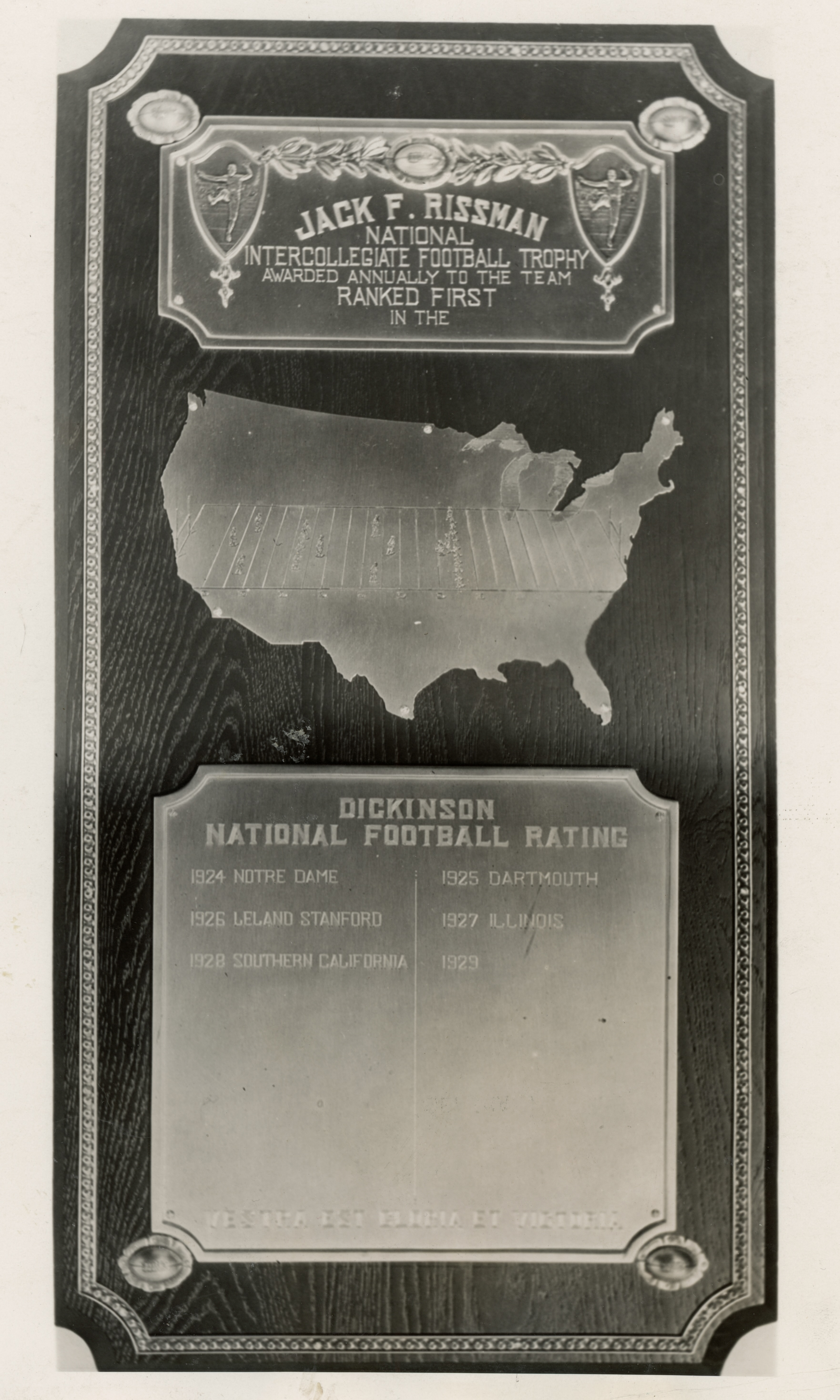
Jack F. Rissman National Intercollegiate Football Trophy — Awarded annually to the team ranked first in the Dickinson National Football Rating

Player	Position
Russ Crane	Guard
Robert Reitsch (captain)	Center
Butch Nowack	Tackle, Kicker
Judson Timm	Halfback
Fritz Humbert	Fullback
Blair French	Quarterback
Dwight Stuessy	Quarterback
Doug Mills	Fullback, Punter
Frank Walker	Fullback
Tom Nickol	Fullback
Art D'Ambrosio	Halfback, Fullback
Arnold Wolgast	Tackle
James R. Stewart	End
Walter Jolley	End
Ernest W. Schultz	Tackle
Keston J. Deimling	Guard
Lawrence Perkins	Guard
Leonard Grable	Tackle
Garland Grange	Halfback, End
William E. Short	End
Louis Gordon	Guard
Louis Muegge	Guard
Evert Nelson	Guard
L. J. Weitz	Tackle
Lloyd. S. Burdick	Tackle
Norman McClure	Guard
Merwin Mitterwallner	Guard
Lester Marriner	Guard

- Head coach: Robert Zuppke (15th year at Illinois)
