= Louis Gilbert =

American football player (1906–1987)

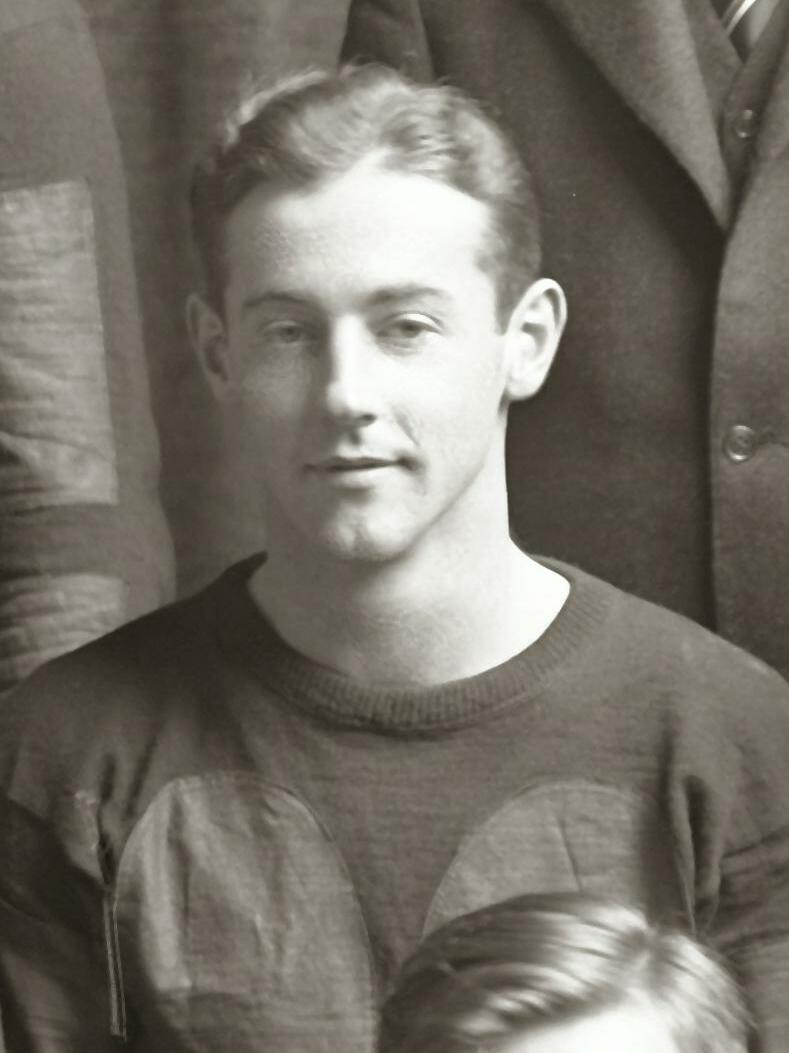
- Gilbert cropped from 1927 Michigan team photograph

Profile
- Position: Halfback

Personal information
- Born: September 15, 1906; Long Beach, California, U.S.
- Died: May 9, 1987 (aged 80); St. Petersburg, Florida, U.S.
- Listed weight: 159 lb (72 kg)

Career information
- College: Michigan

Career history
- 1925–1927: Michigan

Awards and highlights
- Third-team All-American (1927); First-team All-Big Ten (1927)

Louis Matthew Gilbert (September 15, 1906 – May 9, 1987) was an American football player. He played at the halfback position for the Michigan Wolverines football teams from 1925 to 1927. He was selected as a first-team All-Big Ten Conference player in 1927 and was selected by Fielding H. Yost in 1941 as the greatest punter of all time.

== Early life ==
Gilbert was born in Long Beach, California in 1906, but moved to Kalamazoo, Michigan as a boy. His father, Rufus Gilbert (1885–1962), coached football and baseball at Kalamazoo College in the mid-1900s, served as the school's first physical director from 1908 to 1909 and played minor league baseball for several years. The family lived in Peoria, Illinois, for several years during Gilbert's childhood, as his father pitched for the Peoria Distillers, and coached the football team at the Bradley Institute in Peoria. In 1917, when Gilbert was 10 years old, his father had been a player-manager for a minor league baseball club in Terre Haute, Indiana; he then became a coach at Rose Polytechnic Institute in Terre Haute. Gilbert attended high school in Kalamazoo.

== University of Michigan ==
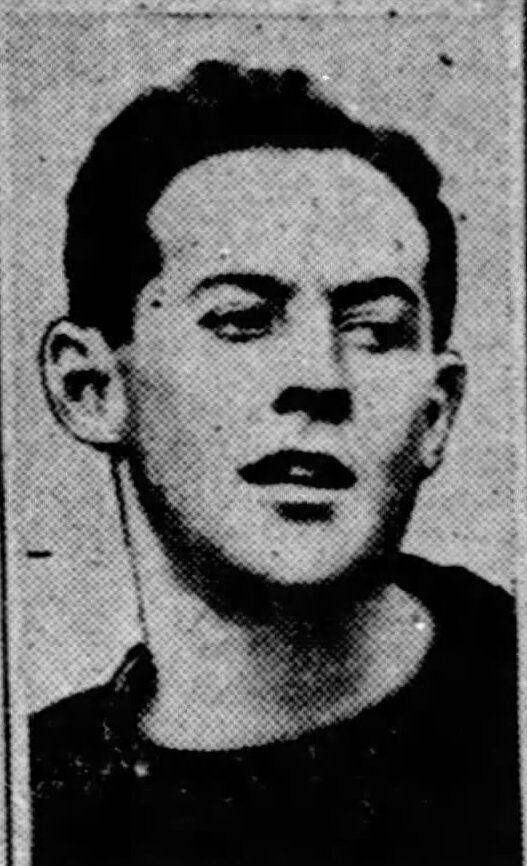
Gilbert circa 1927

Gilbert enrolled at the University of Michigan in 1924. He played football for the Michigan Wolverines football team as a starter at the halfback position from 1925 to 1927. He played largely in the shadow of all-time Michigan football legends Benny Friedman and Bennie Oosterbaan during the 1925 and 1926 seasons, but blossomed into a nationally known football star in 1927.

Gilbert and Oosterbaan were the offensive stars for the 1927 Michigan Wolverines football team, the first team to play in Michigan Stadium. Gilbert helped lead Michigan to a 4–0 start early in the 1927 season, outscoring opponents 89 to 0. On October 1, 1927, in the first game played at Michigan Stadium, Gilbert had a hand in every point scored in a 33–0 win over Ohio Wesleyan. Gilbert scored two touchdowns, kicked three extra points, and threw three touchdown passes in the game. In its account of the game, the Chicago Daily Tribune wrote, "Louis Gilbert, the back field ace who has borne the brunt of the Wolverine kicking for the last two years, was the outstanding performer of today's play."

In the official dedication game for the new stadium, played three weeks later, Gilbert scored the only points of the game on three touchdown receptions and three extra points as the Wolverines defeated the Ohio State Buckeyes, 21–0.

Gilbert drew particular praise for his kicking. A Chicago Daily Tribune profile on the Wolverines in late October 1927 noted:

"Long punts and place kicks by Louis Gilbert and short, accurate passes by Benny Oosterbaan were the features of the Wolverines' workout today ... Standing on or behind the 30 yard line Gilbert consistently launched his place kicks squarely between the posts, the longest effort being 47 yards. Standing in midfield he then vied with Coach Kipke in placing his punts offside within the five yard line."

An injury to Gilbert's arm kept him out of the Illinois game, which Michigan lost, 14–0. When it was announced that Gilbert would be back in time for the game against the Chicago Maroons, newspapers across the country touted the return of Michigan's star halfback. A United Press story published prior to the Chicago game noted:

"The 'kick' is once more in Michigan's lineup. Louis Gilbert is back. The Kalamazoo flash, a punter probably without a peer in the Big Ten, and a forward passer without compunction for enemy defenses, rejoined the Maize and Blue today after an absence since Saturday morning when a sudden arm injury jerked him from the Illinois-Michigan game which subsequently ruined Michigan's chances to again cop the prized Big Ten gonfalon for 1927. His return served as a tonic for his teammates, as he is expected to boot the oval with usual accuracy and distance against Coach Stagg's Maroons Saturday. Gilbert practiced kicking while his mates polished up its offensive and his uncanny forward pass receiver, Bennie Ooslerbaan, limbered up for his notorious end sneaks."

The Chicago Daily Tribune called him "the kickingest young man in the Big Ten" and "the best advertised player at Stagg field Saturday." The Tribune noted that, although he had not received public acclaim in his sophomore and junior years because of the spotlight on Benny Friedman, he had become the focus of attention in Ann Arbor and "one of the leading ladies' men in the Big Ten."

In his return to the lineup against Chicago, Gilbert and Oosterbaan led Michigan to a 14–0 victory. Oosterbaan threw a touchdown pass to Gilbert for the first score, and Gilbert threw a touchdown pass to Oosterbaan for the final score. The Chicago Daily Tribune again focused its coverage on Gilbert's status as a ladies' man, referring to him as "the campus sheik from the neighborhood of Kalamazoo," and noting that he "wears bear grease on his hair and dances a mean black bottom."

After the Chicago game, Gilbert ranked second in scoring in the Big Ten with eight touchdowns and 12 extra point conversions. Interviewed in November 1927, Michigan's first-year head coach Tad Wieman told reporters he "never knew two men in his life more unconcerned in the heat of battle than Gilbert and Benny Friedman, last year's Michigan all-American quarterback whom Gilbert succeeded as a forward-passing partner of Beanie Oosterbaan." At the end of the 1927 season, and although he did not start any games at quarterback, he was selected by the Big Ten Conference coaches as the first-team quarterback for the International News Service (later merged with the United Press into UPI) All-Big Ten team. He was also selected as a first-team All-Big Ten halfback by both Billy Evans and Walter Eckersall. In selecting Gilbert, Eckersall wrote: "Gilbert of Michigan is selected for left halfback. This player was one of the best punters in the country. His kicks were well placed and put Michigan in scoring positions many times. He was also an accurate place-kicker. He carried the ball well on end runs and off tackle slants, did his share of the blocking and played a strong defensive game." He was also selected as a second-team All-American by the Central Press Association, billed as the "Real" All-American team with selections based on fan input with cooperation from "hundreds of newspapers throughout the country." The United Press and Billy Evans both selected Gilbert as a third-team All-American.

At the time of his retirement in 1941, Fielding H. Yost named Gilbert as the greatest punter of all time.

== Later life ==
Gilbert graduated from Michigan in 1928. He worked as a national sales executive for James River Corporation, a paper mill in Parchment, Michigan, for 45 years. He was also a member of the Benevolent and Protective Order of Elks, a county commissioner in Barry County, Michigan, for two years and the Barry County road commissioner for five years.

After retiring, Gilbert moved to St. Petersburg, Florida. In May 1987, he died in St. Petersburg at age 80. He was survived by his wife, Harriett C. Gilbert, two sons, Bartlett and Bradley, two daughters, Nancy Boersma and Eleanor Holiday, nine grandchildren, and three great-granddaughters.
