= 1927 Indiana Hoosiers football team =

American college football season

1927 Indiana Hoosiers football
- Conference: Big Ten Conference
- Record: 3–4–1 (1–2–1 Big Ten)
- Head coach: Harlan Page (2nd season)
- MVP: Clare Randolph
- Captain: Herman Byers
- Home stadium: Memorial Stadium

1927 Big Ten Conference football standings
	Conf.					Overall
Team	W		L		T	W		L		T
No. 1 Illinois +	5	–	0	–	0	7	–	0	–	1
No. 3 Minnesota +	3	–	0	–	1	6	–	0	–	2
No. 7 Michigan	3	–	2	–	0	6	–	2	–	0
Chicago	3	–	3	–	0	4	–	4	–	0
Purdue	2	–	2	–	0	6	–	2	–	0
Northwestern	2	–	3	–	0	4	–	4	–	0
Ohio State	2	–	3	–	0	4	–	4	–	0
Indiana	1	–	2	–	1	3	–	4	–	1
Iowa	1	–	4	–	0	4	–	4	–	0
Wisconsin	1	–	4	–	0	4	–	4	–	0
+ – Conference co-champions; Rankings from Dickinson System

The 1927 Indiana Hoosiers football team represented the Indiana Hoosiers in the 1927 Big Ten Conference football season. The Hoosiers played their home games at Memorial Stadium in Bloomington, Indiana. The team was coached by Harlan Page, in his second year as head coach.

== Schedule ==
Date	Opponent	Site	Result	Attendance	Source
October 1	at Kentucky*	McLean Stadium; Lexington, KY (rivalry)	W 21–0		
October 8	at Chicago	Stagg Field; Chicago, IL	L 0–13	35,000	
October 15	Minnesota	Memorial Stadium; Bloomington, IN	T 14–14	21,000	
October 22	Notre Dame*	Memorial Stadium; Bloomington, IN	L 6–19	16,000	
October 29	at Harvard*	Harvard Stadium; Boston, MA	L 6–26		
November 5	Michigan State*	Memorial Stadium; Bloomington, IN (rivalry)	W 33–7		
November 12	at Northwestern	Dyche Stadium; Evanston, IL	W 18–7		
November 19	Purdue	Memorial Stadium; Bloomington, IN (Old Oaken Bucket)	L 6–21	26,000	
*Non-conference game
