= 1927 Wisconsin Badgers football team =

American college football season

1927 Wisconsin Badgers football
- Conference: Big Ten Conference
- Record: 4–4 (1–4 Big Ten)
- Head coach: Glenn Thistlethwaite (1st season)
- MVP: Ed Crofoot
- Captain: Ed Crofoot
- Home stadium: Camp Randall Stadium

Uniform
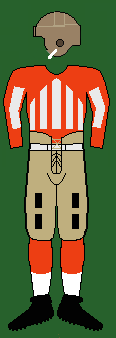

1927 Big Ten Conference football standings
	Conf.					Overall
Team	W		L		T	W		L		T
No. 1 Illinois +	5	–	0	–	0	7	–	0	–	1
No. 3 Minnesota +	3	–	0	–	1	6	–	0	–	2
No. 7 Michigan	3	–	2	–	0	6	–	2	–	0
Chicago	3	–	3	–	0	4	–	4	–	0
Purdue	2	–	2	–	0	6	–	2	–	0
Northwestern	2	–	3	–	0	4	–	4	–	0
Ohio State	2	–	3	–	0	4	–	4	–	0
Indiana	1	–	2	–	1	3	–	4	–	1
Iowa	1	–	4	–	0	4	–	4	–	0
Wisconsin	1	–	4	–	0	4	–	4	–	0
+ – Conference co-champions; Rankings from Dickinson System

The 1927 Wisconsin Badgers football team was an American football team that represented the University of Wisconsin in the 1927 Big Ten Conference football season. The team compiled a 4–4 record (1–4 against conference opponents), finished in a tie for last place in the Big Ten Conference, and outscored all opponents by a combined total of 96 to 75. Glenn Thistlethwaite was in his first year as Wisconsin's head coach.

Halfback Ed Crofoot was selected as the team's most valuable player, the team captain, and a first-team player on the 1927 All-Big Ten Conference football team. Other notable players included halfback Gene H. Rose, end Don Cameron, and tackle Stanley Binish.

The team played its home games at Camp Randall Stadium, which had a capacity of 38,293. During the 1927 season, the average attendance at home games was 18,512.

== Schedule ==
Date	Opponent	Site	Result	Attendance	Source
October 1	Cornell (IA)*	Camp Randall Stadium; Madison, WI	W 31–6		
October 8	at Kansas*	Memorial Stadium; Lawrence KS	W 26–6		
October 15	Michigan	Camp Randall Stadium; Madison, WI	L 0–14	32,645	
October 22	Purdue	Camp Randall Stadium; Madison, WI	W 12–6	15,000	
October 29	at Minnesota	Memorial Stadium; Minneapolis, MN (rivalry)	L 7–13	56,000	
November 5	Grinnell*	Camp Randall Stadium; Madison, WI	W 20–2		
November 12	Iowa^{†}	Camp Randall Stadium; Madison, WI (rivalry)	L 0–16		
November 19	at Chicago	Stagg Field; Chicago, IL	L 0–12	45,000	
*Non-conference game; ^{†}Homecoming
