= 1927 Ohio State Buckeyes football team =

American college football season

1927 Ohio State Buckeyes football
- Conference: Big Ten Conference
- Record: 4–4 (2–3 Big Ten)
- Head coach: John Wilce (15th season)
- Home stadium: Ohio Stadium

Uniform
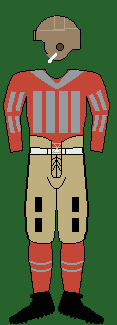

1927 Big Ten Conference football standings
	Conf.					Overall
Team	W		L		T	W		L		T
No. 1 Illinois +	5	–	0	–	0	7	–	0	–	1
No. 3 Minnesota +	3	–	0	–	1	6	–	0	–	2
No. 7 Michigan	3	–	2	–	0	6	–	2	–	0
Chicago	3	–	3	–	0	4	–	4	–	0
Purdue	2	–	2	–	0	6	–	2	–	0
Northwestern	2	–	3	–	0	4	–	4	–	0
Ohio State	2	–	3	–	0	4	–	4	–	0
Indiana	1	–	2	–	1	3	–	4	–	1
Iowa	1	–	4	–	0	4	–	4	–	0
Wisconsin	1	–	4	–	0	4	–	4	–	0
+ – Conference co-champions; Rankings from Dickinson System

The 1927 Ohio State Buckeyes football team represented Ohio State University in the 1927 Big Ten Conference football season. The Buckeyes compiled a 4–4 record but still won the point battle, 131–92. They lost to Michigan for the sixth straight season.

== Schedule ==
Date	Opponent	Site	Result	Attendance	Source
October 1	Wittenberg*	Ohio Stadium; Columbus, OH	W 31–0	24,314	
October 8	at Iowa	Iowa Field; Iowa City, IA	W 13–6	15,000	
October 15	Northwestern	Ohio Stadium; Columbus, OH	L 13–19	42,614	
October 22	at Michigan	Michigan Stadium; Ann Arbor, MI (rivalry)	L 0–21	84,401	
October 29	Chicago	Ohio Stadium; Columbus, OH	W 13–7	35,775-40,000	
November 5	at Princeton*	Palmer Stadium; Princeton, NJ	L 0–20	36,000	
November 12	Denison*	Ohio Stadium; Columbus, OH	W 61–6	16,610	
November 19	Illinois	Ohio Stadium; Columbus, OH (Illibuck)	L 0–13	70,034	
*Non-conference game

== Coaching staff ==
- John Wilce, head coach, 15th year
