= Robert Reitsch =

American football player (1906–1998)

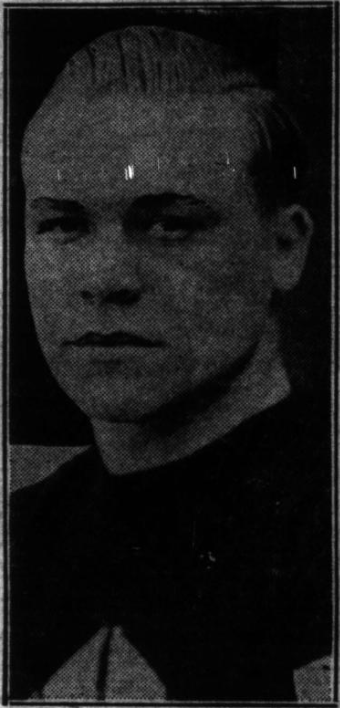
- Reitsch, c. 1927

Profile
- Position: Center

Personal information
- Born: January 11, 1906; Rockford, Illinois, U.S.
- Died: September 4, 1998 (aged 92)

Career information
- High school: Rockford
- College: Illinois (1926–1927)

Awards and highlights
- National champion (1927); First-team All-American (1927); All-Big Ten (1926, 1927)

Robert Reitsch (January 11, 1906 – September 4, 1998) was an American college football player. A prominent center, he was the captain of the national champion 1927 Illinois Fighting Illini football team, chosen first-team All-American by some selectors. Reitsch was a native of Rockford.

He was later secretary of the alumni association.
