= Russ Crane (American football) =

American football player, coach, and boxer

Biographical details
- Born: 1906 or 1907
- Died: March 18, 1966 (aged 59); Monongalia County, West Virginia, U.S.

Playing career

Football
- 1927–1929: Illinois
- Position: Guard

Coaching career (HC unless noted)

Football
- 1935–1938: Richmond (line)
- 1946–1949: Richmond (line)
- 1950–1951: Washington and Lee (line)
- 1952–1963: West Virginia (line)
- 1964–1965: West Virginia (OL)

Men's track and field
- 1942: Richmond
- 1947–1950: Richmond

Accomplishments and honors

Championships
- National (1927)

Awards
- First-team All-American (1927); First-team All-Big Ten (1929); Second-team All-Big Ten (1928)

Russell J. Crane (1906/1907 – March 18, 1966) was an American college football player and coach and boxer. He was a prominent guard for coach Robert Zuppke's Illinois Fighting Illini, captain in 1929.

Crane was an assistant football coach at the University of Richmond from 1935 to 1938. He turned to Richmond as line coach and head track coach in 1946.

He died of pulmonary heart disease in Monongalia County, West Virginia, on March 18, 1966, at age 59.
