= Ray Baer =

American football player (1905–1968)

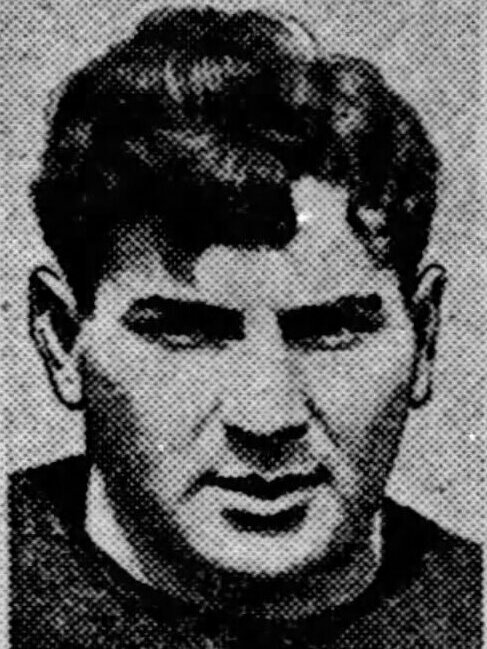
- Baer circa 1927

Profile
- Positions: Guard, tackle

Personal information
- Born: May 7, 1905; Jefferson County, Kentucky, U.S.
- Died: January 19, 1968 (age 62); Louisville, Kentucky, U.S.
- Listed height: 5 ft 11 in (1.80 m)
- Listed weight: 185 lb (84 kg)

Career information
- High school: Manual (Louisville, KY)
- College: Michigan

Career history
- 1924–1927: Michigan

Awards and highlights
- Second-team All-American (1927); First-team All-Big Ten (1927); Second-team All-Big Ten (1926)

Raymond T. Baer (May 7, 1905 – January 19, 1968) was an American football player. He played college football at the University of Michigan from 1924 to 1927. He was selected as a first-team All-Big Ten Conference and second-team All-American player in 1927.

== Early life ==
A native of Louisville, Kentucky, Baer was born in 1905. His parents, Nathan and Simone "Simmie" Baer, were Jewish immigrants from Russia. His father was a tailor.

Baer attended Manual High School. While in high school, he was an all-state football player at the end position. He was reportedly "a Kentucky high school legend" who was also all-state in basketball and won the Kentucky high jump championship.

== University of Michigan ==
Baer played college football at the guard and tackle positions for the University of Michigan Wolverines football teams from 1924 to 1927. Michigan quarterback Benny Friedman said of Baer: "Ray was the best college lineman I ever saw...the fastest man on the squad, he was smart, he was quick, he was very aggressive, and he had great desire. He was wonderful on both offense and defense."

As a senior, Baer started all eight games at right guard for the 1927 Michigan Wolverines football team. He was selected by the Associated Press (AP) as a first-team All-Big Ten Conference player and a second-team All-American in 1927. He was also selected by the United Press as a second-team All-American in 1927. He concluded his college football career playing on the East team in the December 1927 East–West Shrine Game.

== Later life ==
After leaving Michigan, Baer served as the head football coach at Manual High School for many years and later at St. Xavier High School from 1946 to 1951, both in Louisville, Kentucky. His 1938 Manual team won the national high school football championship. He also served as the director of the Jefferson County parks and recreation department. In 1966, he was the 16th person inducted into the Kentucky Athletic Hall of Fame. He died in January 1968 at his home in Louisville at age 62. He has been inducted into the Louisville Jewish Sports Hall of Fame. His wife, Blema Baer, died in 2013 at age 99.

His nephew Neal Baer, a Harvard Medical School graduate, produced the first TV series "Law and Order", for which he won an Emmy. He also worked on the series China Beach, and later produced Law and Order Special Victims Unit.
