= 1927 Michigan Wolverines football team =

University of Michigan football team

1927 Michigan Wolverines football
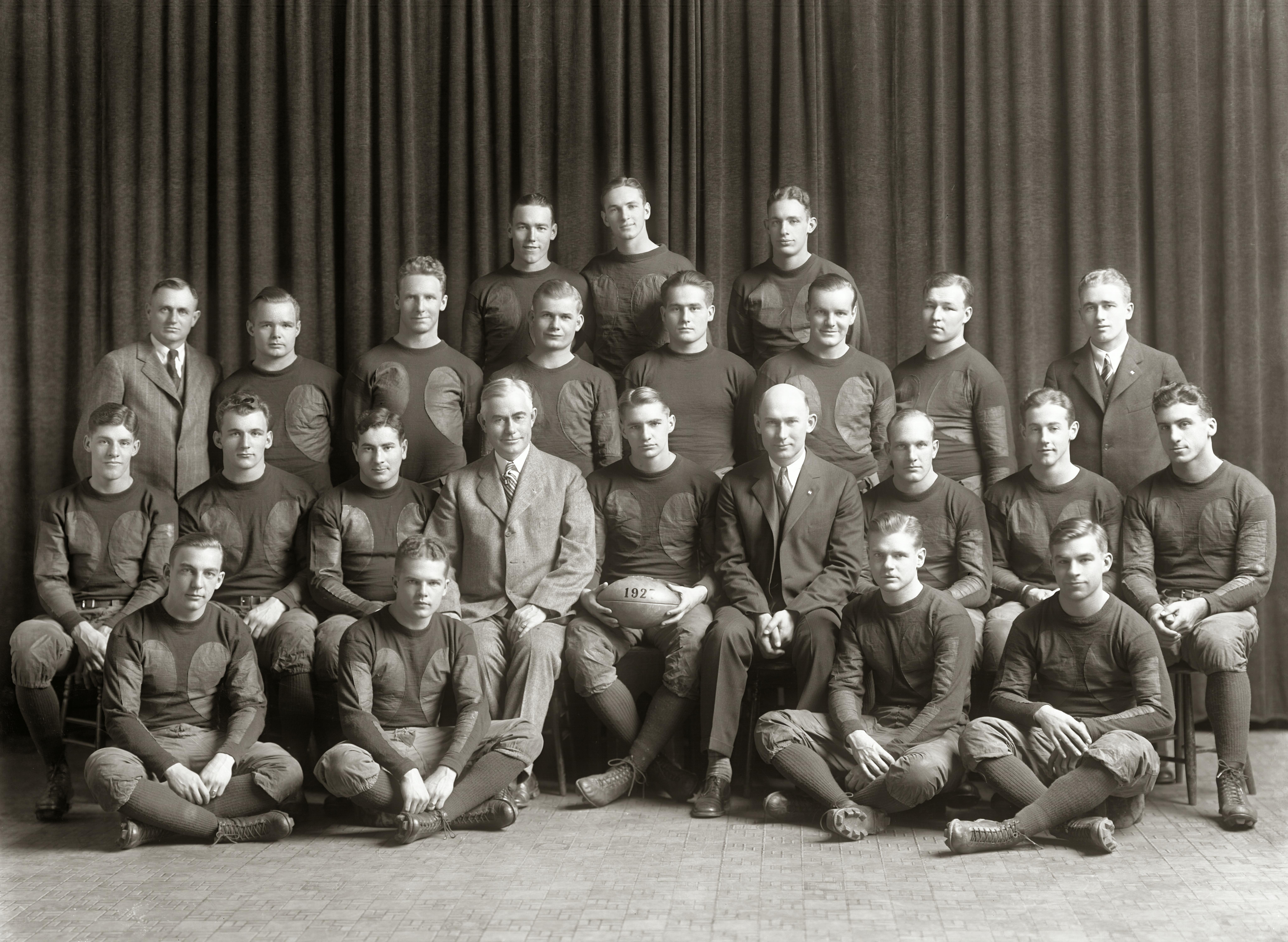
- Conference: Big Ten Conference
- Record: 6–2 (3–2 Big Ten)
- Head coach: Tad Wieman (1st season)
- MVP: Bennie Oosterbaan
- Captain: Bennie Oosterbaan
- Home stadium: Michigan Stadium

Uniform
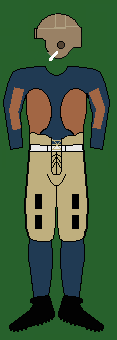

1927 Big Ten Conference football standings
	Conf.					Overall
Team	W		L		T	W		L		T
No. 1 Illinois +	5	–	0	–	0	7	–	0	–	1
No. 3 Minnesota +	3	–	0	–	1	6	–	0	–	2
No. 7 Michigan	3	–	2	–	0	6	–	2	–	0
Chicago	3	–	3	–	0	4	–	4	–	0
Purdue	2	–	2	–	0	6	–	2	–	0
Northwestern	2	–	3	–	0	4	–	4	–	0
Ohio State	2	–	3	–	0	4	–	4	–	0
Indiana	1	–	2	–	1	3	–	4	–	1
Iowa	1	–	4	–	0	4	–	4	–	0
Wisconsin	1	–	4	–	0	4	–	4	–	0
+ – Conference co-champions; Rankings from Dickinson System

The 1927 Michigan Wolverines football team represented the University of Michigan in the 1927 Big Ten Conference football season. The 1927 season was Michigan's first in its new stadium, Michigan Stadium. It was also the first under new head coach Tad Wieman following the retirement of Fielding H. Yost as head coach. Michigan shut out its first four opponents before losing to 1927 Big Ten Conference champion Illinois and later to Big Ten runner up Minnesota. Michigan compiled a record of 6–2 (3–2 Big Ten) and outscored its opponents by a combined score of 137 to 39. The team was ranked No. 7 in the nation in the Dickinson System ratings released in December 1927.

Left end Bennie Oosterbaan was the team's captain and was selected as the team's most valuable player and as a consensus first-team All-American for the third consecutive year. Halfback Louis Gilbert was Michigan's leading scorer with 63 points in seven games. Three Michigan players—Oosterbaan, Gilbert and guard Ray Baer—were all selected as first-team All-Big Ten players. Baer was also selected as a second-team All-American.

== Schedule ==
Date	Opponent	Site	Result	Attendance
October 1	Ohio Wesleyan*	Michigan Stadium; Ann Arbor, MI	W 33–0	17,483
October 8	Michigan State*	Michigan Stadium; Ann Arbor, MI (rivalry)	W 21–0	27,864
October 15	at Wisconsin	Camp Randall Stadium; Madison, WI	W 14–0	32,645
October 22	Ohio State	Michigan Stadium; Ann Arbor, MI (rivalry)	W 21–0	84,401
October 29	at Illinois	Memorial Stadium; Champaign, IL (rivalry)	L 0–14	61,924
November 5	at Chicago	Stagg Field; Chicago, IL (rivalry)	W 14–0	53,042
November 12	Navy*	Michigan Stadium; Ann Arbor, MI	W 27–12	83,650
November 19	Minnesota^{†}	Michigan Stadium; Ann Arbor, MI (Little Brown Jug)	L 7–13	84,423
*Non-conference game; ^{†}Homecoming

== Season summary ==
Michigan's former and new head coaches

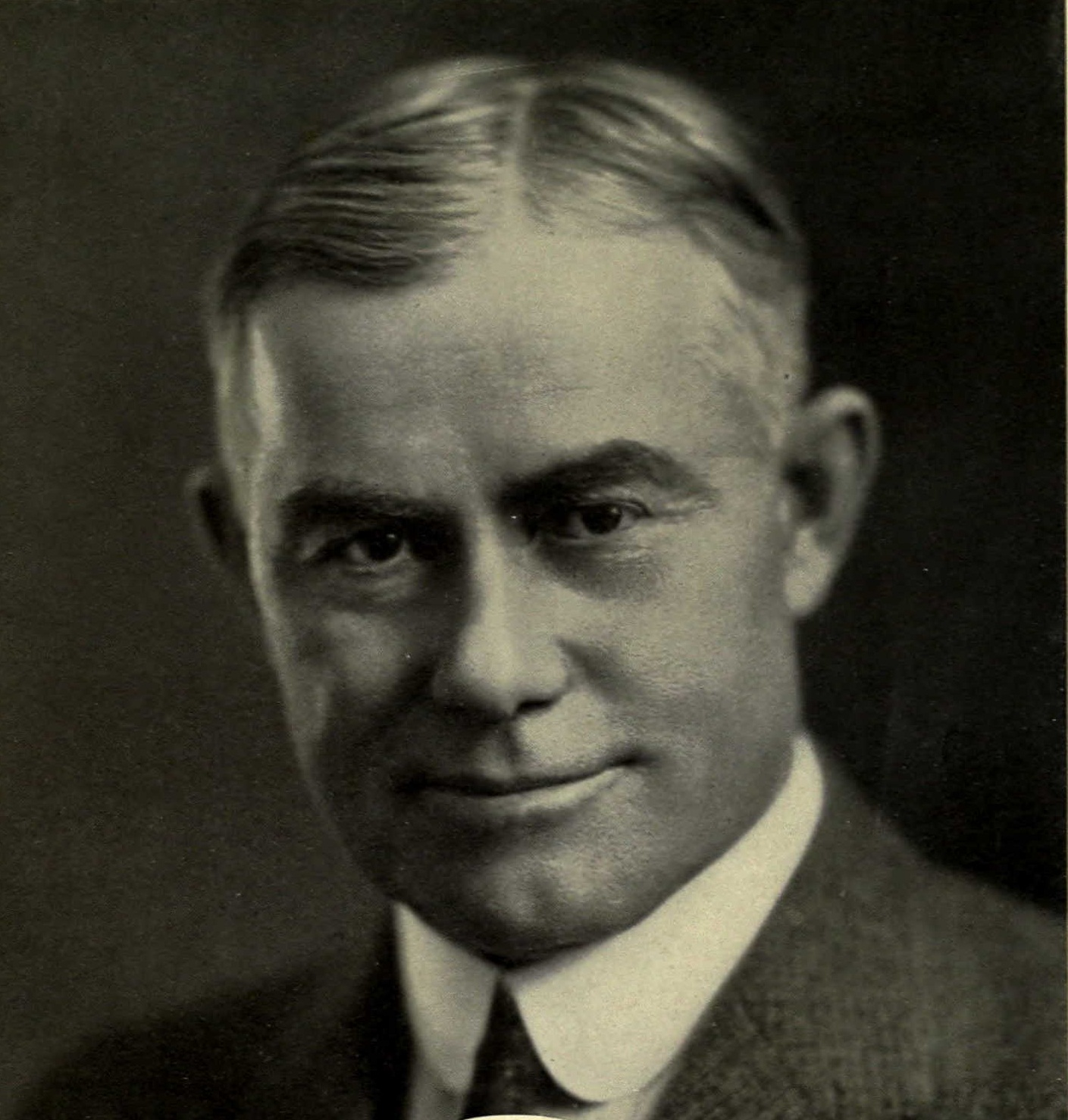
Fielding H. Yost

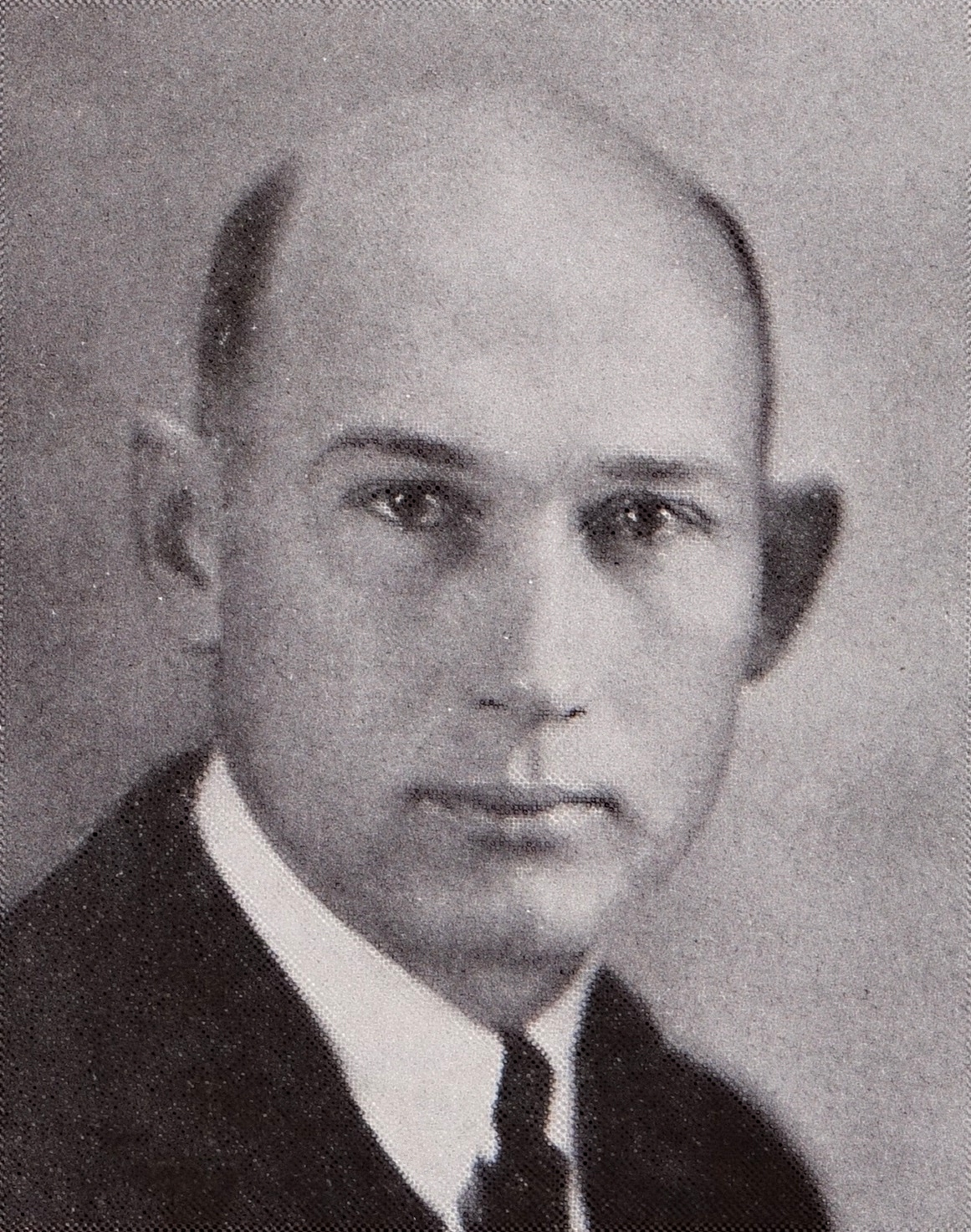
Tad Wieman

=== Pre-season ===
In 1925 and 1926, Michigan had featured quarterback Benny Friedman and end Bennie Oosterbaan, both consensus All-Americans who were sometimes known as "The Benny-to-Bennie Show." Oosterbaan returned for his senior year in 1927, but Friedman was lost to graduation. The 1927 Wolverines also lost back Bo Molenda who went on to play nine seasons in the National Football League.

In addition to roster changes, the months before the opening of Michigan's 1927 season featured two important developments: the construction of Michigan Stadium and the resignation of Fielding H. Yost as head football coach.

The construction of Michigan Stadium began in September 1926 with excavation of the site. The excavation was complicated by the presence of underground springs and was not completed until April 1927. Construction of the stadium itself began in May 1927 with the pouring of concrete. Between May 9 and September 1, 1927, more than 11,000 yards of concrete were poured along with installation of 440 tons of reinforcing steel and 31,000 square feet of wire mesh. The installation of seats and the playing field began in June 1927. With athletic director Yost supervising every step in the process, the stadium was reportedly completed "on time and within budget," with the cost of construction totaling $1,131,733.36.

On September 15, 1927, with construction of the new stadium in its final phase, Yost at age 56 announced his resignation as Michigan's head football coach. Tad Wieman was named as the team's new head coach. Wieman had played for Yost from 1916 to 1917 and, after military service, in 1920. He had been an assistant coach at Michigan for several years. Yost cited his ongoing responsibilities as the school's athletic director, including construction of the new football stadium and a new intramural building, as the reason for his resignation.

=== Week 1: Ohio Wesleyan ===
Week 1: Ohio Wesleyan at Michigan

Team	1	2	3	4	Total
Ohio Wesleyan	0	0	0	0	0
• Michigan	13	14	6	0	33

- Date: October 1, 1927
- Location: Michigan Stadium
  Ann Arbor, MI
- Game attendance: 40,000

On October 1, 1927, Michigan played its first game at Michigan Stadium. The opponent scheduled was Ohio Wesleyan University, where Fielding H. Yost had begun his coaching career in 1897. Under Yost, Ohio Wesleyan had played Michigan to a scoreless tie. When Ferry Field was opened in 1905, Ohio Wesleyan was invited as the first opponent to play at Ferry Field, a game that Michigan won by a 65–0 score.

Michigan defeated Ohio Wesleyan by a 33–0 score in the opening game of the 1927 season. Although the official paid attendance was reported as 17,483, newspaper accounts reported that the game was played before more than 40,000 spectators. An account written for the Bentley Historical Library at the University of Michigan indicates that the discrepancy was likely due to the fact that thousands of high school students attended the game for free.

The game was played on a wet and muddy field following a hard rain. Right end Laverne "Kip" Taylor scored the first touchdown in the new stadium on a 15-yard touchdown pass from right halfback Louis Gilbert in the first quarter. Gilbert was the game's biggest star, as he either scored or passed for all five Michigan touchdowns and kicked three points after touchdown. Gilbert scored on a 24-yard return of a partially blocked punt and on a 90-yard return of the opening kickoff in the second half. He also threw touchdown passes to quarterback Leo Hoffman and left end Bennie Oosterbaan.

Michigan's opening lineup against Ohio Wesleyan was Oosterbaan (left end), Otto Pommerening (left tackle), John Palmaroli (left guard), Carl Thisted (center), Ray Baer (right guard), Henry Grinnell (right tackle), Taylor (right end), Hoffman (quarterback), Samuel Babcock (left halfback), Gilbert (right halfback), and George Rich (fullback).

=== Week 2: Michigan State ===
Week 2: Michigan State at Michigan

Team	1	2	3	4	Total
Michigan State	0	0	0	0	0
• Michigan	7	7	0	7	21

- Date: October 27, 1927
- Location: Michigan Stadium
  Ann Arbor, MI

On October 8, 1927, Michigan defeated Michigan State by a 21–0 score. Michigan's first two touchdowns came on running plays by halfback Louis Gilbert and fullback George Rich, and the third came on a pass from quarterback Leo Hoffman to left end Bennie Oosterbaan. Gilbert kicked one point after touchdown, and Walter Geistert added two.

Michigan's starting lineup against Michigan State was Oosterbaan (left end), Frank Harrigan (left tackle), John Palmeroli (left guard), George Nicholson (center), Carl Thisted (right guard), Norman Gabel (right tackle), Marshall Boden (right end), Hoffman (quarterback), Sam Babcock (left halfback), Gilbert (right halfback), and Rich (fullback).

=== Week 3: at Wisconsin ===
Week 3: Michigan at Wisconsin

Team	1	2	3	4	Total
Michigan	0	0	0	0	0
• Wisconsin	0	7	0	7	14

- Date: October 15, 1927
- Location: Camp Randall Field
  Madison, WI
- Referee: J. E. Masker (Northwestern)

On October 15, 1927, Michigan defeated Wisconsin by a 14–0 score. Michigan's touchdowns were scored by fullback George Rich and left halfback Louis Gilbert. Rich's touchdown came in the second quarter after quarterback Leo Hoffman advanced the ball 26 yards to the one-foot line on a "triple pass". The second touchdown followed a Wisconsin fumble at its own one-yard line with Michigan's left tackle Otto Pommerening recovering the loose ball. Gilbert then scored on a lateral pass from left end Bennie Oosterbaan. Gilbert also kicked for two points after touchdown, though he was injured in the game. Oosterbaan also caught four passes for 79 yards and was credited with being the key to Michigan's defense: "Defensively it was a case of Oosterbaan at all stages. He was the first down the field under punts. He was usually the man who waylaid the [backs] in the Badger backfield."

Michigan's starting lineup against Michigan State was Bennie Oosterbaan (left end), Otto Pommerening (left tackle), John Palmeroli (left guard), Alan Bovard (center), Ray Baer (right guard), Norman Gabel (right tackle), Laverne "Kip" Taylor (right end), Leo Hoffman (quarterback), Gilbert (left halfback), Sam Babcock (right halfback), and Rich (fullback).

=== Week 4: Ohio State ===
Week 4: Ohio State at Michigan

Team	1	2	3	4	Total
Ohio State	0	0	0	0	0
• Michigan	0	7	7	7	21

- Date: October 22, 1927
- Location: Michigan Stadium
  Ann Arbor, MI
- Game attendance: 84,401
- Referee: Masker (Northwestern)

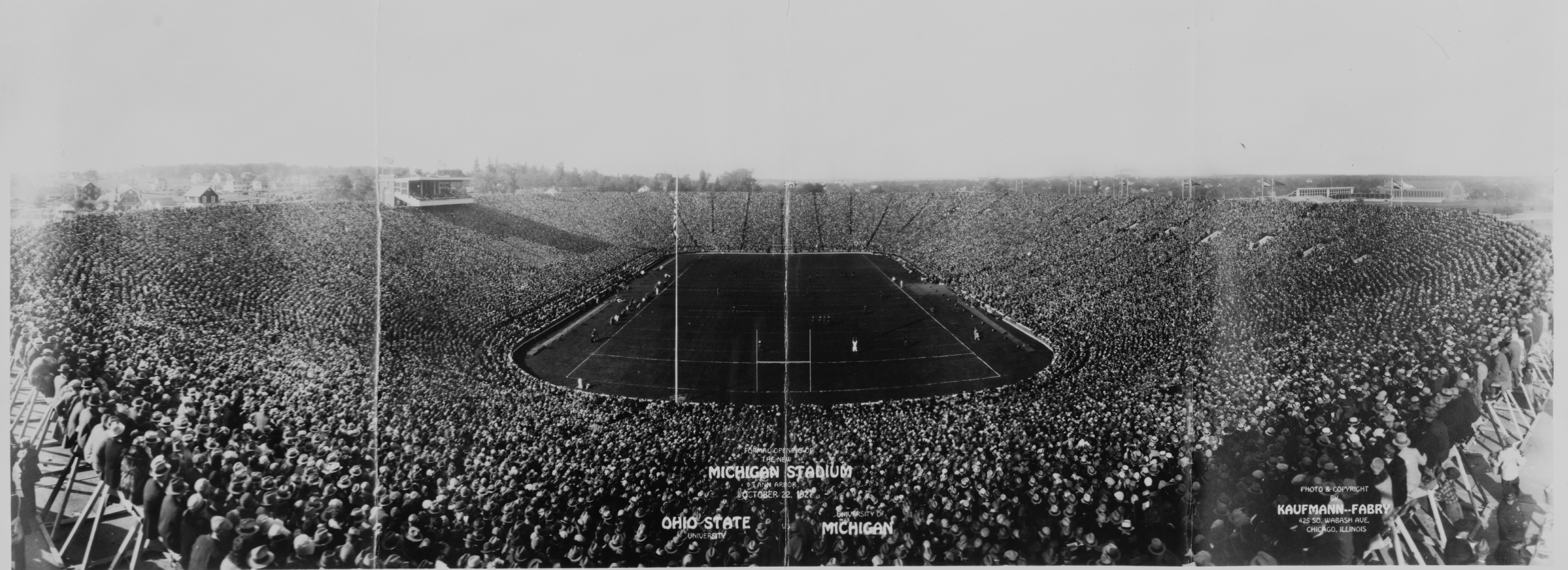
Dedication game for Michigan Stadium

On October 22, 1927, Michigan defeated Ohio State 21–0 in the official dedication game for Michigan Stadium. Before the game began, the Governors of Michigan (Fred W. Green) and Ohio (A. Victor Donahey) and other dignitaries followed the two university bands onto the field for the playing of "The Star-Spangled Banner". The Michigan Alumnus reported that the game was played before a crowd of 85,000 spectators and described the day as follows: "As a football spectacle, of course, it wholly surpassed anything in Michigan history. Ann Arbor flung open its gates to a horde of visitors nearly triple the size of its own population-and the new stadium swallowed them by two o'clock in the afternoon." Planes flew overhead throughout the game, prompting the Detroit Free Press to declare: "It is about time an end is put to this practice of free lance air men of picking courses over crowded areas. Any kind of a spill while any one of the fliers was above a stadium might have meant a hundred deaths."

All three Michigan touchdowns were scored on passes from left end Bennie Oosterbaan to left halfback Louis Gilbert. Gilbert also kicked all three points after touchdown, claiming responsibility for all of Michigan's 21 points. The first touchdown came in the second quarter on a pass that went 25 yards in the air with Gilbert then running the remaining 15 yards with the ball. The second touchdown in the third quarter came on a pass from Oosterbaan to Gilbert that covered 38 yards.

Michigan's starting lineup against Ohio State was Oosterbaan (left end), Otto Pommerening (left tackle), John Palmeroli (left guard), Alan Bovard (center), Ray Baer (right guard), Norman Gabel (right tackle), Herman Nyland (right end), Leo Hoffman (quarterback), James Miller (left halfback), Gilbert (right halfback), and George Rich (fullback).

=== Week 5: at Illinois ===
Week 5: Michigan at Illinois

Team	1	2	3	4	Total
Michigan	0	0	0	0	0
• Illinois	7	0	7	0	14

- Date: October 29, 1927
- Location: Memorial Stadium
  Champaign, IL
- Game attendance: 62,000

On October 29, 1927, Michigan traveled to Champaign, Illinois, and lost its first game of the season losing to Illinois by a 14–0 score. Michigan played without its backfield star, Louis Gilbert, who was injured the prior week when he threw three touchdown passes against Ohio State. The first Illinois touchdown followed a fumble by Gilbert's replacement, William Puckelwartz, at Michigan's seven-yard line. Illinois' halfback Timm ran around the end for the touchdown.

Michigan's starting lineup against Illinois was Bennie Oosterbaan (left end), Frank Harrigan (left tackle), John Palmeroli (left guard), Alan Bovard (center), Ray Baer (right guard), Norman Gabel (right tackle), Herman Nyland (right end), Leo Hoffman (quarterback), James F. Miller (left halfback), Puckelwartz (right halfback), and George Rich (fullback).

=== Week 6: at Chicago ===
Week 6: Michigan at Chicago

Team	1	2	3	4	Total
• Michigan	0	0	14	0	14
Chicago	0	0	0	0	0

- Date: November 5, 1927
- Location: Stagg Field
  Chicago, IL
- Referee: Frank Birch

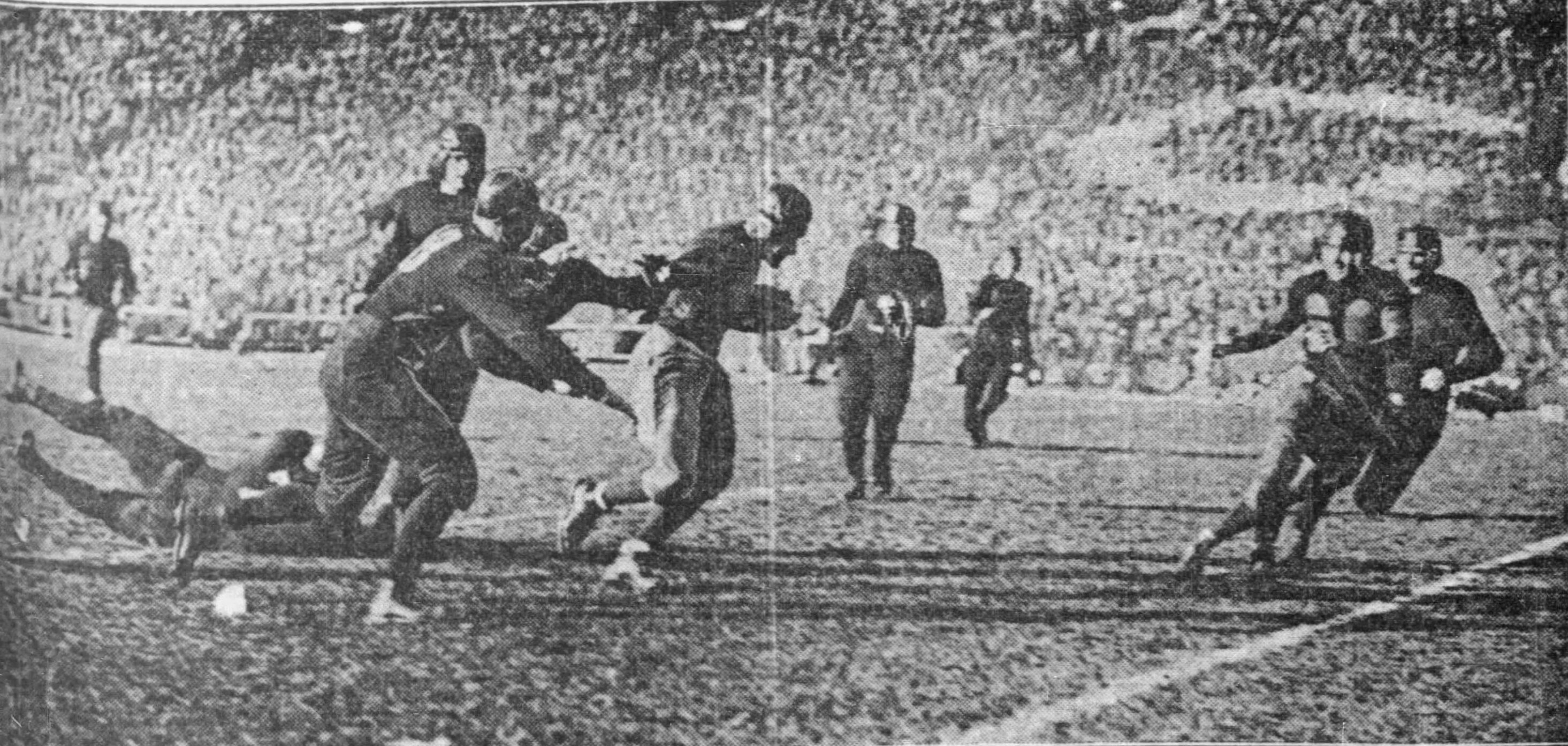
Louis Gilbert runs with the ball against Chicago

On November 5, 1927, Michigan defeated the University of Chicago Maroons 14–0 at Stagg Field in Chicago. At the end of the second quarter Louis Gilbert attempted a field goal after Michigan had moved the ball to Chicago's 17-yard line, but his kick hit the goal post. Michigan's first points came in the third quarter on a trick play in which Bennie Oosterbaan took the ball from quarterback James Miller on what appeared to be an end run from the two-yard line. Instead, Oosterbaan tossed a lateral pass to Gilbert who scored the touchdown. Michigan's second touchdown also came in the third quarter with the ball on Chicago's 22-yard line. Gilbert threw a touchdown pass to Oosterbaan who was guarded by two defenders and leaped to grab the pass as he crossed the goal line. Gilbert also kicked both points after touchdown.

Michigan's starting lineup against Chicago was Bennie Oosterbaan (left end), Otto Pommerening (left tackle), John Palmeroli (left guard), Alan Bovard (center), Ray Baer (right guard), Norman Gabel (right tackle), LeRoy Heston (right end), James F. Miller (quarterback), Gilbert (left halfback), William Puckelwartz (right halfback), and George Rich (fullback).

=== Week 7: Navy ===
Week 7: Navy at Michigan

Team	1	2	3	4	Total
Navy	6	0	6	0	12
• Michigan	14	0	13	0	27

- Date: November 12, 1927
- Location: Michigan Stadium
  Ann Arbor, MI
- Referee: Crowell (Swarthmore)

On November 12, 1927, Michigan defeated Navy by a 27–12 score at Michigan Stadium. Fullback George Rich scored two touchdowns for Michigan. Quarterback Jim Miller ran for 117 yards on 17 carries and scored a touchdown. The final Michigan touchdown was scored by Bennie Oosterbaan. Louis Gilbert kicked three points after touchdown. Navy's touchdowns were scored by Whitey Lloyd and Shag Ransford.

Michigan's starting lineup against Navy was Bennie Oosterbaan (left end), Otto Pommerening (left tackle), John Palmeroli (left guard), John Schoenfeld (center), Ray Baer (right guard), Howard Poe (right tackle), Herman Nyland (right end), James F. Miller (quarterback), William Puckelwartz (left halfback), Louis Gilbert (right halfback), and George Rich (fullback).

=== Week 8: Minnesota ===
Week 8: Minnesota at Michigan

Team	1	2	3	4	Total
• Minnesota	0	0	6	7	13
Michigan	7	0	0	0	7

- Date: November 19, 1927
- Location: Michigan Stadium
  Ann Arbor, MI
- Referee: Walter Eckersall (Chicago)

On November 19, 1927, Michigan lost to Minnesota by a 13–7 score at Michigan Stadium. Bennie Oosterbaan scored Michigan's touchdown in the first quarter on a long forward pass from halfback William Puckelwartz, and Louis Gilbert kicked the point after touchdown. Minnesota came from behind with 13 points in the second half on touchdown runs by Herb Joesting and a touchdown pass from Harold "Shorty" Almquist to Haycraft. Minnesota had 15 first downs in the game while Michigan had only two. Minnesota's victory was its first over Michigan since 1919. The game was also the Michigan's first defeat at Michigan Stadium and the final college football game for Michigan stars Oosterbaan and Gilbert and for Minnesota stars Joesting and Almquist. Walter Eckersall served as the game's referee and wrote in the Chicago Tribune: "For hard, aggressive playing combined with splendid sportsmanship it was one of the best struggles I ever officiated in."

Michigan's starting lineup against Navy was Oosterbaan (left end), Otto Pommerening (left tackle), John Palmeroli (left guard), Alan Bovard (center), Ray Baer (right guard), Norman Gabel (right tackle), Herman Nyland (right end), James F. Miller (quarterback), Gilbert (left halfback), Puckelwartz (right halfback), and George Rich (fullback).

== Personnel ==
=== Varsity letter winners ===
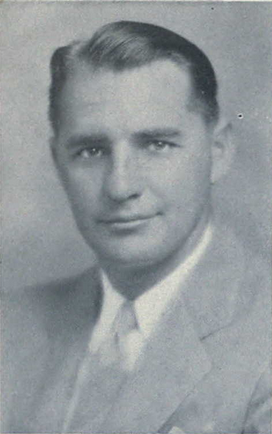
All-American end Bennie Oosterbaan

All-Big Ten halfback Louis Gilbert

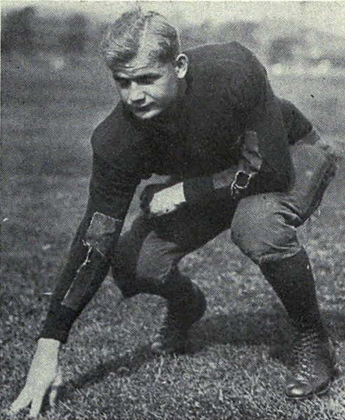
Tackle Otto Pommerening

The following players won varsity letters for their work on the 1929 football team:

- Ray Baer – started 8 games at right guard
- Alan Bovard – started 6 games at center
- Victor E. Domhoff – quarterback
- Fred W. Fuller – fullback
- Norman Gabel – started 6 games at right tackle
- Joe Gembis – halfback
- Louis Gilbert – started 6 games at right halfback, 1 game at left halfback
- Frank A. Harrigan – started 1 game at left tackle
- LeRoy G. Heston – started 2 games at right end
- Leo W. Hoffman – started 5 games at quarterback
- James F. Miller – started 3 games at quarterback, 2 games at left halfback
- Herman Z. Nyland – started 4 games at right end
- Bennie Oosterbaan – started 8 games at left end
- John M. Palmeroli – started 7 games at left guard, 1 game at left tackle
- Howard W. Poe – started 1 game at right tackle
- Otto Pommerening – started 6 games at left tackle, 1 game at left guard
- William H. Puckelwartz – started 2 games at left halfback, 2 games at right halfback
- George E. Rich – started 8 games at fullback
- John B. Schoenfeld – started 1 game at center
- Laverne "Kip" Taylor – started 1 game at right end
- John Dallas Whittle – quarterback

=== aMa letter winners ===
The following players won aMa letters for their work on the 1927 football team:

- Sam Babcock – started 3 games at left halfback
- Marshall H. Boden – started 1 game at right end
- Clare F. Carter – end
- Roy Cragin – center
- Paul Flajole – guard
- Walter E. Geistert – halfback
- Henry Grinnell - started 1 game at right tackle
- Douglas Kerr - end
- Jennings McBride – quarterback
- George Nicholson Jr. - guard
- Roy F. Parker - guard
- Edwin B. Poorman - tackle
- James S. Robbins - tackle
- Bruce Schwarze - halfback
- Harvey G. Straub - quarterback
- Dominic Sullo - halfback
- Carl Thisted - started 1 game at center
- Harold Walder - tackle

=== Scoring leaders ===
Player	Touchdowns	Extra points	Field goals	Total Points
Louis Gilbert	8	15	0	63
Bennie Oosterbaan	5	0	0	30
George Rich	4	0	0	24
Leo Hoffman	1	0	0	6
James Miller	1	0	0	6
Kip Taylor	1	0	0	6
Walter Geistert	0	2	0	2
Totals	20	14	0	137

=== Awards and honors ===
- Captain: Bennie Oosterbaan
- All-Americans: Bennie Oosterbaan (consensus first-team); Ray Baer (second-team pick by Associated Press, United Press and others)
- All-Conference: Bennie Oosterbaan (AP-1), Ray Baer (AP-1), Louis Gilbert (AP-1)
- Most Valuable Player: Bennie Oosterbaan
- Meyer Morton Award: Laverne (Kip) Taylor

=== Coaching and administrative staff ===
- Head coach: Tad Wieman
- Assistant coaches: Jack Blott, Robert J. Brown, Ray Courtright, Ray Fisher, William Flora, Cliff Keen, Harry Kipke, William Louisell, Jack Lovette, Edwin Mather, George F. Veenker
- Athletic director: Fielding H. Yost
- Trainer: Charles B. Hoyt
- Manager: James V. Hughey, Timothy Andrae (assistant), Benjamin Boutell (assistant), Dana Norton (assistant), Richard Walpher (assistant)
