= Tad Wieman =

American football player, coach, administrator (1896–1971)

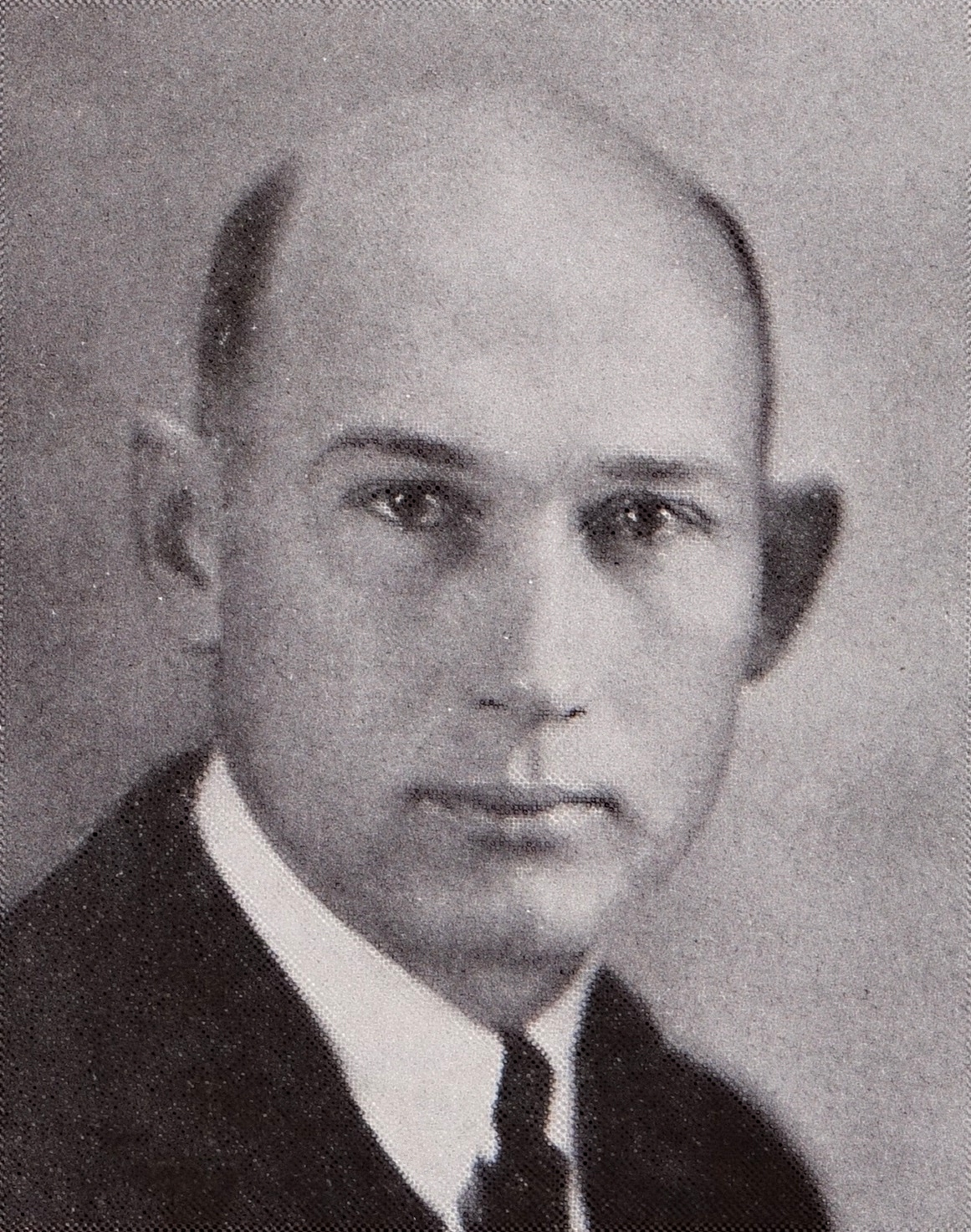
- Wieman from the 1925 Michiganensian

Biographical details
- Born: October 4, 1896; Orosi, California, U.S.
- Died: December 26, 1971 (aged 75); Portland, Oregon, U.S.

Playing career
- 1915–1917: Michigan
- 1920: Michigan
- Positions: End, tackle, fullback

Coaching career (HC unless noted)
- 1921–1926: Michigan (assistant)
- 1927–1928: Michigan
- 1930–1931: Minnesota (first assistant / line)
- 1932–1937: Princeton (assistant)
- 1938–1942: Princeton
- 1944–1945: Columbia (assistant)

Administrative career (AD unless noted)
- 1945–1951: Maine
- 1951–1962: Denver

Head coaching record
- Overall: 29–24–4

Accomplishments and honors

Awards
- Amos Alonzo Stagg Award (1962)
- College Football Hall of Fame; Inducted in 1956 (profile)

Elton Ewart "Tad" Wieman (October 4, 1896 – December 26, 1971) was an American college football player and coach and athletics administrator. He played football for the University of Michigan from 1915 to 1917 and 1920 under head coach Fielding H. Yost. He was a coach and administrator at Michigan from 1921 to 1929, including two years as the school's head football coach. Wieman served as a football coach at the University of Minnesota from 1930 to 1931, Princeton University from 1932 to 1942, and Columbia University from to 1945, and as an athletic director at the University of Maine from 1945 to 1951 and the University of Denver from 1951 to 1962. He was inducted into the College Football Hall of Fame as a coach in 1956.

== Youth in California ==
Wieman was born in Tulare County, California, and raised in Los Angeles. His father, William H. Wieman, was a native of Missouri and a Presbyterian minister. Wieman was the seventh of eight children born to William and his wife Alma. At the time of the 1900 United States census, the family lived in Orosi, California. By 1910, the family had moved to Los Angeles.

At Los Angeles High School, Wieman followed in the footsteps of four older brothers, Henry, "Ink," Drury and "Tabby" Wieman. All had been excellent athletes in football, track, baseball and basketball. "Tad" played at "breakaway" in rugby football for Los Angeles High and was heralded as the best athlete in a family regarded as "the greatest athletic one in the history of Southern California athletics." Wieman had been expected to follow his older brothers who had all enrolled at Occidental College, but he broke the family tradition when he decided to attend the University of Michigan. When Wieman announced his decision to attend Michigan, the Los Angeles Times called it "a calamity of almost national importance." The Times reported at length on Wieman's decision, noting:

"The fifth of the Wieman tribe has upset the most ancient tradition of Occidental College. The mighty Tad, terror of all Rugbyites last year, while playing for Los Angeles High, last Sunday quietly folded his tent like the Arab and stole away. ... Tad promised to be the greatest of them all. ... What Occidental will do without the great Tad nobody knows."

The expectations for Wieman were so high that Coach Featherstone of Los Angeles High, who reportedly urged Wieman to go to Michigan, said, "Tad Wieman will be one of the greatest athletes this country has ever seen before his college course is over."

== University of Michigan athlete and service in World War I ==
=== Freshman season ===
In 1915, Wieman enrolled at Michigan. Wieman worked nights to pay for his expenses and studied into the morning to keep up with his classes.

Though he had only played rugby football before coming to Michigan, Wieman played on Michigan's freshman football team. Wieman's hometown newspaper, the Los Angeles Times, followed his progress, reporting in October 1915 that he was "making quite a reputation for himself as tackle on the freshman eleven" and noting that "Coach Yost seems to be quite pleased with his work." As Wieman progressed, the Times ran a feature story reporting that "the big, raw-boned freshman from Southern California" was stopping Michigan's top varsity players, including All-American John Maulbetsch, and leaving them piled up "in a squirming heap." Coach Yost was reported to have bawled many varsity players for their inability to get past Wieman, with Maulbetsch complaining, "It can't be done, coach." Each night, the varsity players reportedly swore to get Wieman, but never did. Wieman reportedly took the punishment and came up from under the pile each time smiling. Wieman also demonstrated his talent on offense:

"He is used by the freshmen on end-around plays. He has a peculiar way of running with a loose hitch in his hips that shakes off tacklers. He also handles the ball well and is the best man at catching forward passes among the freshmen. Wieman gives Rugby (the English game he played in California) and basketball the credit for his ability to catch the ball. On punts he is generally waiting for his man to catch the ball."

If it were not for the ban on freshmen play, the Times concluded there was no doubt that he would be playing on the varsity team.

=== Sophomore season ===
As a 183-pound sophomore in 1916, Wieman played for the varsity football team and was moved from end to the line, playing seven games at left tackle. Wieman has been called "one of the greatest linemen ever developed" by Yost.

=== Junior season ===
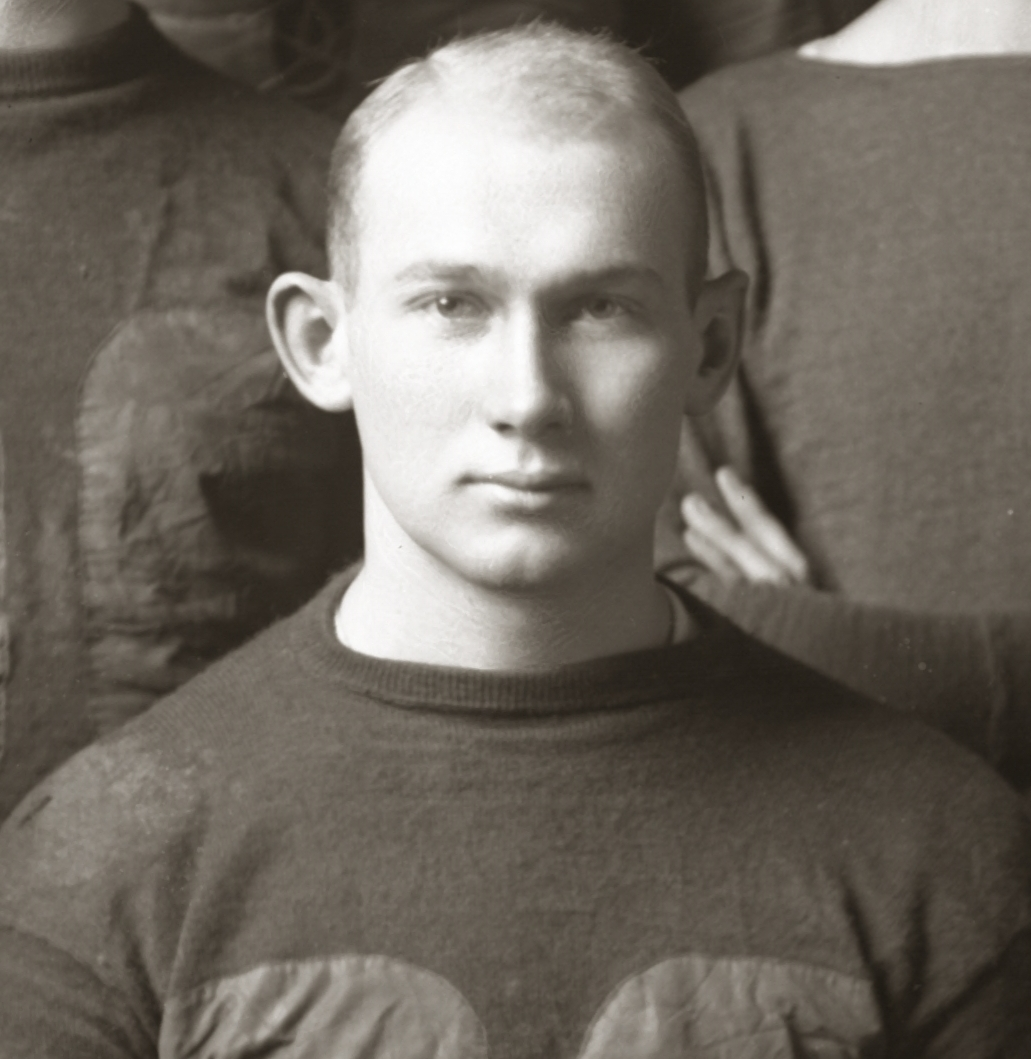
Photograph of Wieman from the 1917 team photograph

In 1917, Michigan was short of backfield talent, and Coach Yost moved Wieman again, this time from tackle to fullback. With his weight increased to 194 pounds, Wieman played eight games at fullback and one at left tackle, and "starred in each position." An October 1917 newspaper account described Wieman's value to the team as follows:

"Yost's one lucky move seems to hinge on the recent change of 'Tad' Wieman from tackle to fullback. Wieman is a giant who musters nearly 200 pounds of actual muscle. This is only his third year in the university, but he already was talked of a sure all-American tackle. Shifting him to fullback may have ruined his chances of making Camp's all-American this year, but it undoubtedly will save the Michigan team. The whole Michigan offense will be built around Wieman. He has developed the plunging habit that results in big gains every time he tries it in scrimmage. Wieman also is a lad who can use his head. Nobody knows what Yost would do if Wieman got laid out, but he is not the type of man that is likely to spend any time flat on his back. As a kicker, Wieman is beginning to shine too, scoring from drop and place kicks in scrimmage after only a few days of practice in the toe art."

After a close 17–13 win over Kalamazoo's Western State Normal School in early October 1917, the headline read "Wieman Saves Day for Wolverines at Close." Wieman kicked a field goal early and scored the winning touchdown late in the fourth quarter. In a late October 1917 game against the Nebraska Cornhuskers, Wieman scored a touchdown, kicked two field goals and two extra points, and scored 14 of Michigan's 20 points. In all, Wieman scored 125 of Michigan's 304 points in 1917, including 76 successful point after touchdown kicks out of 80 attempts.

=== Service in World War I ===
After the conclusion of the 1917 season, Wieman was unanimously elected to be captain of the 1918 squad by the team's 18 lettermen. However, in December 1917, Wieman announced his intention of enlisting in the Aviation Corps. Wieman returned to Los Angeles for a time in January 1918, while awaiting his call to service. During Wieman's visit to Los Angeles in 1918, the Los Angeles Times reported that although "the strapping celebrity now wears college-cut, tailor-mades instead of whistling corduroy knickerbockers," he was still the same "bashful, moon-faced, good-natured Tad."

Wieman ultimately became a lieutenant in the air service and played tackle on a championship service team. Though he did not play a single game for the University of Michigan in 1918, the team continued to recognize Wieman as captain of the 1918 team that was undefeated and recognized as a national champion.

=== Senior season ===
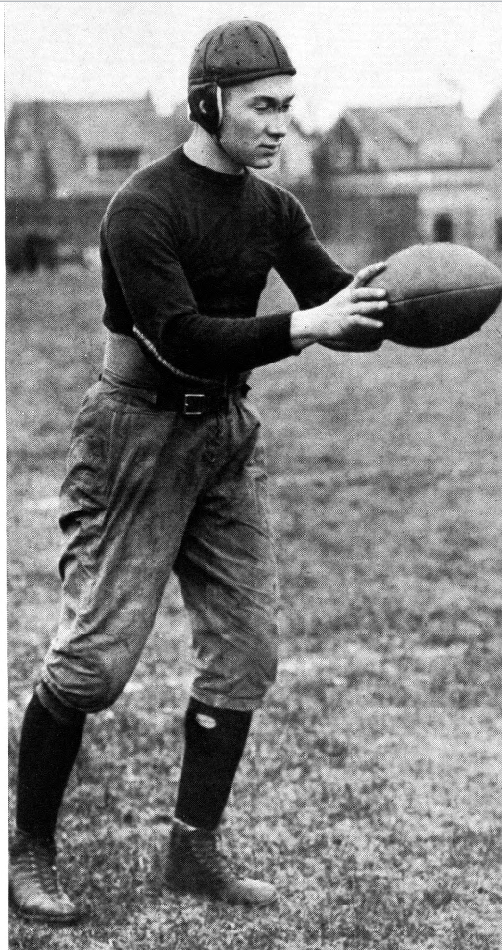
Elton Wieman, 1917

After completing his military service, Wieman returned to Michigan with one year of eligibility remaining. In 1920, the 24-year-old, 177-pound senior was 17 pounds lighter than he was in his junior year and played five games at right tackle. Wieman was "one of the best liked and respected men on the team," and finished his football career playing with a badly injured knee.

Wieman was a member of Phi Beta Kappa and won the Western Conference Medal for excellence in scholarship and athletics.

== Coaching career ==
=== Michigan ===
Wieman was an assistant football coach at Michigan from 1921 to 1926 and the head coach from 1927 to 1928.

==== Assistant coach ====
As an assistant to Fielding H. Yost, Wieman was responsible for the linemen. Wieman coached several All-American linemen, and the 1924 Michigan yearbook noted that "he has consistently produced lines that have ranked with the best in the country." By 1924, Wieman had also been named Michigan's Assistant Athletic Director under Yost. In a show of his confidence in Wieman, Yost reportedly told Wieman in 1925, "Tad, you take the line as usual and I won't have to worry about that." Wieman's line stopped Red Grange and the Illinois team in 1925 by a score of 3–0.

==== 1927 season ====
At the end of the 1926 season, Yost retired as Michigan's head coach, and Wieman was appointed as the school's new head coach. In Wieman's first year as head coach, Michigan went 6–2 with All-American Bennie Oosterbaan leading the effort. In December 1927, Wieman expressed concern about the team's prospects for 1928 without Oosterbaan: "We have been riding on the crest of the wave for some time, and perhaps we are due for a poor season, possibly not; who can tell?"

==== 1928 season ====
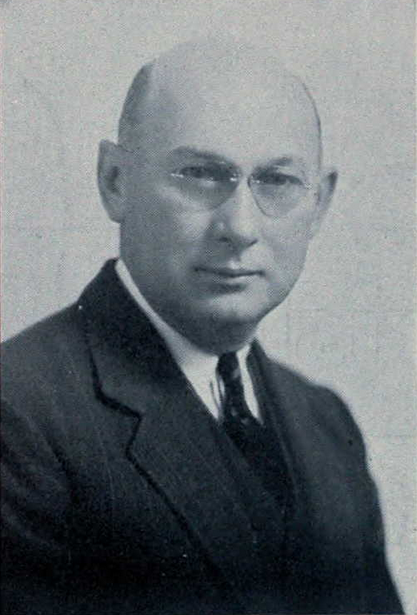
Wieman from 1948 Michiganensian

In 1928, the Michigan football team finished with a record of 3–4–1. The 1928 season also saw conflict between Wieman and Yost. Before the season began, Yost became restless and announced that he would return to his head coaching responsibilities. After taking control from Wieman, Yost then announced to newspapers the night before the season opener that Wieman was once again the head football coach. Wieman told friends that Yost had failed to notify him in advance, and "he was the most surprised man in the country" when Yost made the announcement.

In October 1928, newspapers across the country reported that there had been a break between Yost and Wieman. The Detroit News reported, "While no official word of any eruption has been issued, it is well known in inner circles that Wieman is in rebellion and thinking seriously of leaving Ann Arbor." Wieman reportedly contended that he had never really been allowed to take control of the team and felt that he was being used as a scapegoat for the team's poor showing. In late October 1928, the athletic department issued a "joint statement" from Wieman and Yost denying any estrangement and noting that their relationship was too long and intimate to be jeopardized by "any minor misunderstandings." In an apparent compromise over responsibility for the team's poor showing, the statement noted, "For the handling of the football team up to October 5, Mr. Yost assumes full responsibility. Since the above date Mr. Wieman has been in charge as head coach."

==== Removal as head coach ====
Despite the public denials, the strained relations between Yost and Wieman continued. In May 1929, an unnamed member of the school's board of athletic control told reporters that Wieman and Yost had reached a parting of the ways and that "a reconciliation between the two was impossible." Wieman was again caught by surprise and told reporters, "I have not resigned from my position and have no desire or intention of resigning." The next day, Yost again denied any strain in his relationship with Wieman but announced, "Mr. Wieman will not be a member of the coaching staff of next fall's football team." Wieman was replaced as head football coach by Harry Kipke and assigned to other duties for the balance of 1929. At the time of the 1930 United States census, Wieman was living in Ann Arbor, Michigan, with his wife, Margaret, and their two children Robert A. Wieman and Helen E. Wieman. His occupation was listed as a teacher at the university.

=== Minnesota ===
In February 1930, the University of Minnesota hired Fritz Crisler as its head football coach, and Wieman was hired as Crisler's first assistant and line coach. Crisler and Wieman remained at Minnesota for two years.

=== Princeton ===
In 1932, Crisler accepted the position of head football coach at Princeton University, and Wieman went with him as an assistant coach. In February 1938, Crisler resigned as head coach at Princeton to become the head coach at Michigan. Crisler offered Wieman a spot as an assistant coach at Michigan, but Wieman declined and became Princeton's head football coach in 1938. Wieman was the first Princeton coach to lead the Tigers to four consecutive victories over Yale.

=== U.S. Army and Columbia ===
During World War II, Wieman worked for the United States Department of War. He was a civilian consultant to director of military training and chief of the physical training section of the Army Specialized Training Program for the Army Service Forces. He was also an assistant football coach at Columbia University with Lou Little in 1944 and 1945. From January to April 1946, Wieman was the athletic adviser to the Eighth Army in occupied Japan.

== Athletic director career ==
=== Maine ===
In November 1945, Wieman was hired by the University of Maine as its dean of men and its first director of physical education and athletics. He began working at the University when his duties with the Department of War concluded in May 1946. He served in that capacity for five years.

=== Denver ===
In August 1951, Wieman became the athletic director at the University of Denver. While at Denver, Wieman was an active participant in the NCAA football rules committee. In 1957, he led the effort to prohibit the practice of grabbing an opposing player's face mask and declaring it a personal foul penalty. Wieman noted at the time: "The use of the protective face mask is becoming quite general, and the practice of players grabbing opponents by the masks is also becoming all too common. Such a procedure is not a part of football. It can't be an accident and the feeling of the committee is to cut down on this type of thing before it leads to worse conditions." Wieman retired from his position at the University of Denver in June 1962, after more than 40 years as a college athlete, coach and athletic administrator.

== Retirement and death ==
During his retirement years, Wieman lived in Portland, Oregon and Lake Arrowhead, California. In 1962, he became the first full-time West Coast director of the Fellowship of Christian Athletes (FCA), and serving as its president for a time. Wieman established the FCA's west coast headquarters in Portland. Wieman chose Portland rather than his hometown of Los Angeles, saying "There are too many people and too much smog down there. In Portland a man can feel good." In a 1963 interview with the Los Angeles Times, Wieman said the FCA sought to "harness hero worship" and use it for evangelism and conversion to Christianity. Wieman died in December 1971 in Portland at age 75.

== Honors ==
Wieman was elected as the President of the American Football Coaches Association in 1947. In 1956, he was inducted in the College Football Hall of Fame. In 1962, Wieman received the Amos Alonzo Stagg Award from the American Football Coaches Association.

== Head coaching record ==
Year	Team	Overall	Conference	Standing	Bowl/playoffs
Michigan Wolverines (Big Ten Conference) (1927–1938)
1927	Michigan	6–2	3–2	3rd	
1928	Michigan	3–4–1	2–3	T–7th	
Michigan:		9–6–1			
Princeton Tigers (Independent) (1938–1942)
1938	Princeton	3–4–1			
1939	Princeton	7–1			
1940	Princeton	5–2–1			
1941	Princeton	2–6			
1942	Princeton	3–5–1			
Princeton:		20–18–3			
Total:		29–24–4			
