= Ken Haycraft =

American football player (1907–1995)

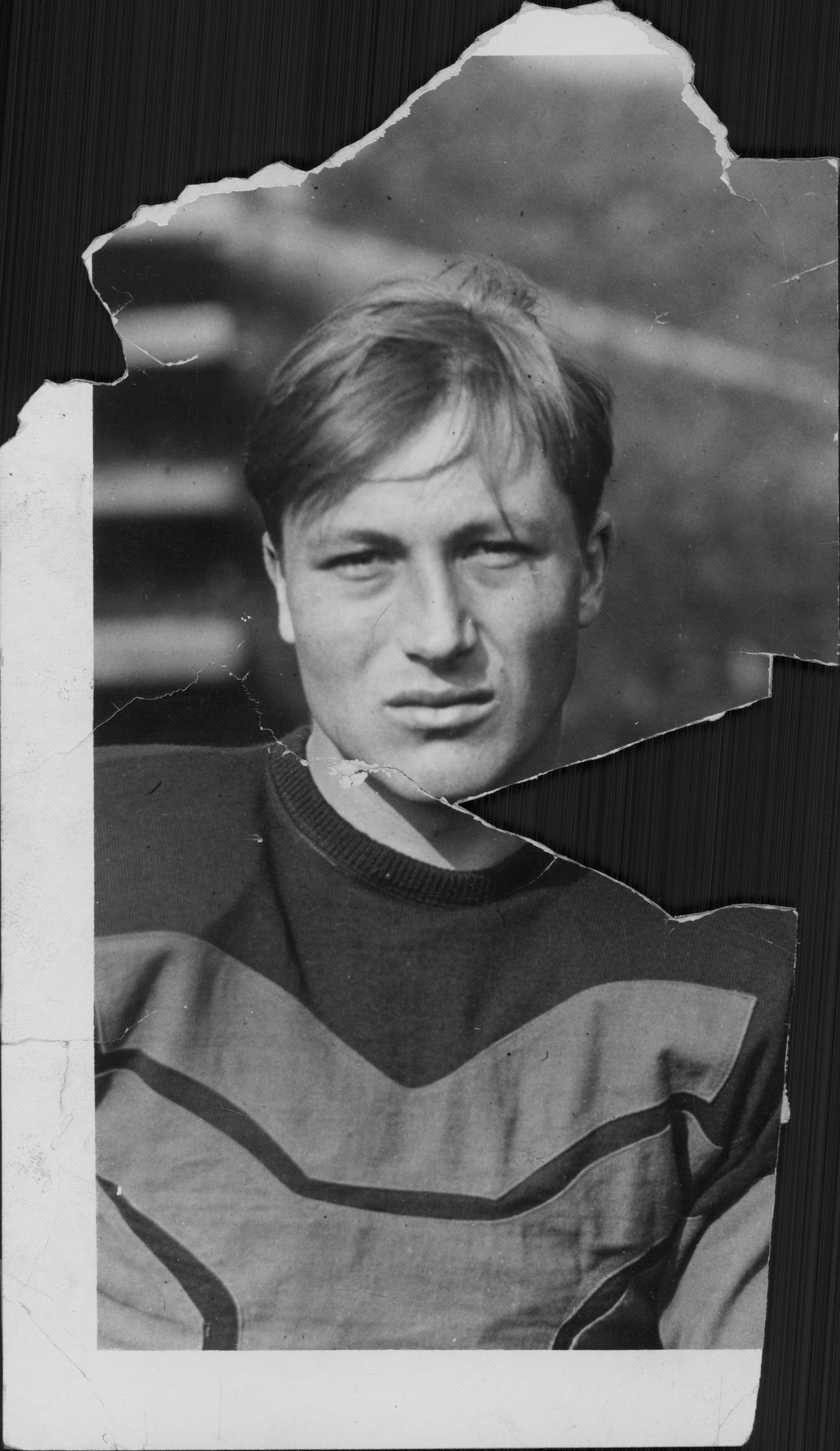

No. 25, 21
- Position: End

Personal information
- Born: February 16, 1907; Bemidji, Minnesota, U.S.
- Died: June 29, 1995 (aged 88); Kaneohe, Hawaii, U.S.
- Listed height: 6 ft 0 in (1.83 m)
- Listed weight: 178 lb (81 kg)

Career information
- High school: East (Minnesota)
- College: Minnesota

Career history
- Minneapolis Red Jackets (1929–1930); Green Bay Packers (1930)

Awards and highlights
- First-team All-American (1928); First-team All-Big Ten (1928); Second-team All-Big Ten (1927)

Career statistics
- Games played: 16
- Touchdowns: 2
- Stats at Pro Football Reference

Kenneth C. Haycraft (February 16, 1907 – June 29, 1995) was an American football player in the National Football League (NFL).

== Biography ==
Haycraft was born on February 16, 1907, in Bemidji, Minnesota.

== Career ==
Haycraft played with the Minneapolis Red Jackets during the 1929 NFL season before splitting the following season with the Red Jackets and the Green Bay Packers. As such, he was a member of the 1930 NFL Champion Packers.

He played at the collegiate level at the University of Minnesota.
