= 1913 Western Conference football season =

- Sport: Football
- Teams: 9
- Champion: Chicago

Football seasons
- 1912 1914

1913 Western Conference football standings
	Conf.					Overall
Team	W		L		T	W		L		T
Chicago $	7	–	0	–	0	7	–	0	–	0
Iowa	2	–	1	–	0	5	–	2	–	0
Minnesota	2	–	1	–	0	5	–	2	–	0
Purdue	2	–	1	–	2	4	–	1	–	2
Illinois	2	–	2	–	1	4	–	2	–	1
Wisconsin	1	–	2	–	1	3	–	3	–	1
Ohio State	1	–	2	–	0	4	–	2	–	1
Indiana	2	–	4	–	0	3	–	4	–	0
Northwestern	0	–	6	–	0	1	–	6	–	0
$ – Conference champion

The 1913 Western Conference football season was the eighteenth season of college football played by the member schools of the Western Conference (later known as the Big Ten Conference) and was a part of the 1913 college football season. This was Ohio State's first year as members of the conference.

== Season overview ==
The Chicago Maroons won the Western title with a perfect 7–0 record, of which all seven victories were conference wins. Chicago was also retroactively named as the 1913 national champion by the Billingsley Report and as a co-national champion by Parke H. Davis.

Iowa and Minnesota finished behind Chicago with 5-2 records and both went 2–1 in Western play. Purdue fell right behind with a 4-1-2 record, (2–1–2).

Illinois ended their season at 4-2-1 (2–2–1). Wisconsin wound up 3-3-1 (1–2–1) while newcomer Ohio State came in at 4-2-1 (1–2).

Indiana finished at 3-4 (2–4) while Northwestern followed at 1–6, with all six losses coming at the hands of Western rivals.

=== Chicago ===
Date	Opponent	Site	Result	Attendance	Source
October 4	Indiana	Marshall Field; Chicago, IL	W 21–7	10,000	
October 18	Iowa	Marshall Field; Chicago, IL	W 23–6		
October 25	Purdue	Marshall Field; Chicago, IL (rivalry)	W 6–0	18,000	
November 1	Illinois	Marshall Field; Chicago, IL	W 28–7		
November 8	at Northwestern	Northwestern Field; Evanston, IL	W 14–0		
November 15	at Minnesota	Northrop Field; Minneapolis, MN	W 13–7	21,000	
November 22	Wisconsin	Marshall Field; Chicago, IL	W 19–0		

=== Iowa ===
Date	Opponent	Site	Result	Source
October 4	Iowa State Teachers*	Iowa Field; Iowa City, IA	W 45–3	
October 6	Cornell (IA)*	Iowa Field; Iowa City, IA	W 76–0	
October 18	at Chicago	Stagg Field; Chicago, IL	L 6–23	
October 25	at Northwestern	Northwestern Field; Evanston, IL	W 78–6	
November 8	Indiana	Iowa Field; Iowa City, IA	W 60–0	
November 15	Iowa State*^{†}	Iowa Field; Iowa City, IA (rivalry)	W 45–7	
November 22	at Nebraska*	Nebraska Field; Lincoln, NE (rivalry)	L 0–12	
*Non-conference game; ^{†}Homecoming

=== Minnesota ===
Date	Opponent	Site	Result	Attendance
September 27	South Dakota*	Northrop Field; Minneapolis, MN	W 14–0	7,000
October 4	Iowa State*	Northrop Field; Minneapolis, MN	W 25–0	3,000
October 18	at Nebraska*	Nebraska Field; Lincoln, NE (rivalry)	L 0–7	9,000
October 25	North Dakota*	Northrop Field; Minneapolis, MN	W 30–0	2,500
November 1	at Wisconsin	Randall Field; Madison, WI (rivalry)	W 21–3	11,000
November 15	Chicago	Northrop Field; Minneapolis, MN	L 7–13	21,000
November 22	at Illinois	Illinois Field; Champaign, IL	W 19–9	3,500
*Non-conference game

=== Purdue ===
Date	Opponent	Site	Result	Attendance	Source
October 4	Wabash*	Stuart Field; West Lafayette, IN	W 26–0		
October 11	at Northwestern	Northwestern Field; Evanston, IL	W 34–0		
October 18	Wisconsin	Stuart Field; West Lafayette, IN	T 7–7		
October 25	at Chicago	Stagg Field; Chicago, IL (rivalry)	L 0–6	18,000	
November 8	Rose Polytechnic*	Stuart Field; West Lafayette, IN	W 62–0		
November 15	at Illinois	Illinois Field; Champaign, IL (rivalry)	T 0–0		
November 22	at Indiana	Jordan Field; Bloomington, IN (Old Oaken Bucket)	W 42–7		
*Non-conference game

=== Illinois ===
Date	Opponent	Site	Result	Attendance	Source
October 4	Kentucky*	Illinois Field; Champaign, IL	W 21–0		
October 11	Missouri*	Illinois Field; Champaign, IL (rivalry)	W 24–7		
October 18	Northwestern	Illinois Field; Champaign, IL	W 37–0		
October 25	at Indiana	Washington Park; Indianapolis, IN (rivalry)	W 10–0	8,500	
November 1	at Chicago	Stagg Field; Chicago, IL	L 7–28	20,000	
November 15	Purdue^{†}	Illinois Field; Champaign, IL (rivalry)	T 0–0	7,000	
November 22	Minnesota	Illinois Field; Champaign, IL	L 9–19	3,500	
*Non-conference game; ^{†}Homecoming

=== Wisconsin ===
Date	Opponent	Site	Result	Attendance	Source
October 4	Lawrence*	Randall Field; Madison, WI	W 58–7		
October 11	Marquette*	Randall Field; Madison, WI	W 13–0		
October 18	at Purdue	Stuart Field; West Lafayette, IN	T 7–7		
October 25	Michigan Agricultural*	Randall Field; Madison, WI	L 7–12		
November 1	Minnesota^{†}	Randall Field; Madison, WI (rivalry)	L 3–21	11,000	
November 8	Ohio State	Randall Field; Madison, WI	W 12–0		
November 22	at Chicago	Stagg Field; Chicago, IL	L 0–19		
*Non-conference game; ^{†}Homecoming

=== Ohio State ===
Date	Opponent	Site	Result	Attendance	Source
October 4	Ohio Wesleyan*	Ohio Field; Columbus, OH	W 58–0	3,500	
October 11	Western Reserve*	Ohio Field; Columbus, OH	W 14–8		
October 18	Oberlin*	Ohio Field; Columbus, OH	T 0–0		
November 1	Indiana	Ohio Field; Columbus, OH	L 6–7		
November 8	at Wisconsin	Randall Field; Madison, WI	L 0–12		
November 15	Case*	Ohio Field; Columbus, OH	W 18–0		
November 22	Northwestern	Ohio Field; Columbus, OH	W 58–0		

=== Indiana ===
Date	Opponent	Site	Result	Attendance	Source
September 27	DePauw*	Jordan Field; Bloomington, IN	W 48–3		
October 4	at Chicago	Stagg Field; Chicago, IL	L 7–21	10,000	
October 25	vs. Illinois	Washington Park; Indianapolis, IN (rivalry)	L 0–10	8,500	
November 1	at Ohio State	Ohio Field; Columbus, OH	W 7–6		
November 8	at Iowa	Iowa Field; Iowa City, IA	L 0–60		
November 15	at Northwestern	Northwestern Field; Evanston, IL	W 21–20		
November 22	Purdue	Jordan Field; Bloomington, IN (rivalry)	L 7–42		
*Non-conference game

=== Northwestern ===
Date	Opponent	Site	Result	Attendance	Source
October 4	Lake Forest*	Northwestern Field; Evanston, IL	W 10–0		
October 11	Purdue	Northwestern Field; Evanston, IL	L 0–34		
October 18	at Illinois	Illinois Field; Champaign, IL (rivalry)	L 0–37		
October 25	Iowa	Northwestern Field; Evanston, IL	L 6–78		
November 8	Chicago	Northwestern Field; Evanston, IL	L 0–14		
November 15	Indiana	Northwestern Field; Evanston, IL	L 20–21		
November 22	at Ohio State	Ohio Field; Columbus, OH	L 0–58		
*Non-conference game

=== Bowl games ===
No Western Conference schools participated in any bowl games during the 1913 season.

== All-American honors ==
- Bob Butler, Tackle, Wisconsin (WC–2; HW-1; MFP-1; SBH-1; TT-2)
- Huntington, End, Chicago (INS-2)
- **Paul Des Jardien**, Center, Chicago (College Football Hall of Fame) (WC–1; HW-1; INS-1; TT-2)
- **Ray Keeler**, Guard, Wisconsin (INS-1; MFP-2)
- Nelson Norgren, Halfback, Chicago (WC–3; INS-2; MFP-2; FY-1)
- Elmer Oliphant, Halfback, Purdue (College Football Hall of Fame) (TT-2)
- Paul Russell, Quarterback, Chicago (HW-1; INS-2)
- Lorin Solon, End, Minnesota (WC–3; INS-2; MFP-1; FY-1)

=== Key ===
NCAA recognized selectors for 1913

- WC = Collier's Weekly as selected by Walter Camp
- INS = Frank G. Menke, sporting editor of the International News Service

Other selectors

- HW = Harper's Weekly, as selected by football critic Herman Reed
- MFP = Milwaukee Free Press
- FY = Fielding H. Yost, head coach at the University of Michigan
- PHD = Parke H. Davis, Princeton's representative on the football rules committee, in the New York Herald
- TT = Tom Thorp, former captain of Columbia football team and head football coach at Fordham University
- SBH = S. B. Hunt in the Newark Sunday Call
- TET = Trenton Evening-Times, selected by a "well known gridiron critic whose name is withheld by special request"

Bold = Consensus All-American

- 1 – First-team selection
- 2 – Second-team selection
- 3 – Third-team selection

== All-Western selections ==
=== Ends ===
- Lorin Solon, Minnesota (CDN-1, CON, CRH, CT, ECP-1, IO-2, WE-1)
- Clark Shaughnessy, Minnesota (CDN-2 [fullback], CRH, ECP-1 [guard]) (CFHOF)
- Norman K. Wilson, Illinois (ECP-2)
- Earl Huntington, Chicago (CDN-2, WE-2)
- Harold Ofstie, Wisconsin (CDN-2, IO-1)
- Harold Pogue, Illinois (IO-2)

=== Tackles ===
- Bob Butler, Wisconsin (CDN-1, CON, CRH, CT, ECP-1, IO-1, WE-1)
- Archie Kirk, Iowa (ECP-2, IO-2)
- Harold Ernest Goettler, Chicago (CDN-2)

=== Guards ===
- Ray Keeler, Wisconsin (CDN-2, CON, CRH, ECP-2, IO-1, WE-2) [CAA]
- Harris, Chicago (CDN-1, ECP-2, IO-2)
- Boles Rosenthal, Minnesota (IO-1)
- H. B. Routh, Purdue (IO-2)

=== Centers ===
- Paul Des Jardien, Chicago (CDN-1, CON, CRH, CT, ECP-1, IO-1, WE-1) [CAA, CFHOF]
- C. E. Glossop, Purdue (CDN-2, ECP-2)

=== Quarterbacks ===
- Pete Russell, Chicago (ECP-1, WE-2)
- Samuel Gross, Iowa (CDN-2)
- Wilbur Hightower, Northwestern (IO-2)

=== Halfbacks ===
- Nelson Norgren, Chicago (CDN-1, CON, CRH, CT, ECP-1, IO-1, WE-1)
- William McAlmon, Minnesota (ECP-2)
- Gray, Chicago (CDN-2, ECP-2)
- Elmer Oliphant, Purdue (IO-2) (CFHOF)
