= 1912 All-Western college football team =

American all-star college football team

The 1912 All-Western college football team consists of American football players selected to the All-Western teams chosen by various selectors for the 1912 college football season.

== All-Western selections ==
=== Ends ===
- Joseph Hoeffel, Wisconsin (Ax, ECP-1, WE-1)
- Miller Pontius, Michigan (Ax, ECP-1, FY [tackle], WE-1)
- Roy Torbet, Michigan (FY)
- John Vruwink, Chicago (FY)
- Harold R. Mulligan, Nebraska (WE-2)
- Andrew N. Johnson, Northwestern (WE-2)

=== Tackles ===
- Bob Butler, Wisconsin (Ax, ECP-1, FY, WE-1) (CFHOF)
- Jim Trickey, Iowa (ECP-1, WE-2)
- Donald B. Barricklow, Ohio State (WE-1)
- Halstead Carpenter, Chicago (WE-2)

=== Guards ===
- Ray Keeler, Wisconsin (Ax, ECP-1, WE-1)
- Clark Shaughnessy, Minnesota (Ax [tackle], ECP-1) (CFHOF)
- Fred Ebert, Wabash (WE-1)
- Clem Quinn, Michigan (FY)
- Russell J. McCurdy, Michigan Agricultural (FY)
- Henry Hanson, Iowa (WE-2)
- Ernest Allmendinger, Michigan (WE-2)

=== Centers ===
- Paul Des Jardien, Chicago (Ax, ECP-1, WE-1) (CFHOF)
- Al Feeney, Notre Dame (WE-2)
- George C. Paterson, Michigan (Ax [guard], FY)

=== Quarterbacks ===
- Eddie Gillette, Wisconsin (Ax, ECP-1, FY, WE-1)
- Gus Dorais, Notre Dame (WE-2) (CFHOF)

=== Halfbacks ===
- James B. Craig, Michigan (Ax, ECP-1, FY, WE-1)
- John VanRiper, Wisconsin (Ax, ECP-1, WE-1)
- Elmer Oliphant, Purdue (WE-2)
- William McAlmon, Minnesota (FY, WE-2)

=== Fullbacks ===
- Ray Eichenlaub, Notre Dame (WE-1) (CFHOF)
- Alvin Tandberg, Wisconsin (Ax, ECP-1, WE-2)
- George C. Thomson, Michigan (FY)

== Key ==
Bold = consensus choice by a majority of the selectors

Ax = George W. Axelson, Chicago football writer

ECP = E. C. Patterson for Collier's Weekly

FY = Fielding H. Yost, head football coach at University of Michigan, in the Detroit Free Press

WE = Walter Eckersall for the Chicago Tribune

CFHOF = College Football Hall of Fame

== See also ==
- 1912 College Football All-America Team
