= 1913 Kansas State Aggies football team =

American college football season

1913 Kansas State Aggies football
- Conference: Kansas Collegiate Athletic Conference, Missouri Valley Conference
- Record: 3–4–1 (2–1–1 KCAC, 0–2 MVC)
- Head coach: Guy Lowman (3rd season)
- Home stadium: Ahearn Field

1913 Kansas Collegiate Athletic Conference football standings
	Conf.					Overall
Team	W		L		T	W		L		T
College of Emporia +	5	–	0	–	1	5	–	2	–	1
Southwestern (KS) +	4	–	1	–	1	6	–	1	–	1
Washburn	2	–	0	–	2	3	–	2	–	2
Kansas State	2	–	1	–	1	3	–	4	–	1
Baker	3	–	2	–	0	4	–	4	–	0
Friends	3	–	2	–	0	?	–	?	–	?
Kansas State Normal	4	–	4	–	0	4	–	6	–	0
Cooper	3	–	3	–	0	?	–	?	–	?
Pittsburg Normal	1	–	1	–	1	4	–	2	–	1
St. Mary's (KS)	2	–	3	–	0	3	–	4	–	1
Fairmount	1	–	6	–	0	2	–	6	–	1
Hays Normal	0	–	1	–	0	4	–	2	–	0
Kansas City University	0	–	2	–	0	0	–	3	–	0
Ottawa	0	–	4	–	0	1	–	4	–	0
+ – Conference co-champions

1913 Missouri Valley Conference football standings
	Conf.					Overall
Team	W		L		T	W		L		T
Missouri +	4	–	0	–	0	7	–	1	–	0
Nebraska +	3	–	0	–	0	8	–	0	–	0
Kansas	3	–	2	–	0	5	–	3	–	0
Iowa State	2	–	2	–	0	4	–	4	–	0
Drake	1	–	3	–	0	4	–	3	–	1
Kansas State	0	–	2	–	0	3	–	4	–	1
Washington University	0	–	4	–	0	1	–	5	–	0
+ – Conference co-champions

The 1913 Kansas State Aggies football team represented Kansas State Agricultural College—now known as Kansas State University—as a member of the Kansas Collegiate Athletic Conference (KCAC) and the Missouri Valley Conference (MVC) during the 1913 college football season. Led by third-year head coach Guy Lowman, the Aggies compiled an overall record of 3–4–1 with a mark of 2–1–1 in KCAC play, placing fourth in the KCAC. Kansas State was 0–2 against MVC opponents, placing sixth in that conference.

== Schedule ==
Date	Opponent	Site	Result	Source
October 3	Southwestern (KS)	Ahearn Field; Manhattan, KS	L 10–13	
October 11	at Nebraska	Nebraska Field; Lincoln, NE (rivalry)	L 6–24	
October 18	Kansas State Normal	Ahearn Field; Manhattan, KS	W 33–0	
October 25	Kansas	Ahearn Field; Manhattan, KS (rivalry)	L 0–26	
November 1	Fairmount	Ahearn Field; Manhattan, KS	W 30–7	
November 8	Texas A&M*	Ahearn Field; Manhattan, KS	W 12–0	
November 18	at Texas*	Clark Field; Austin, TX	L 0–46	
November 27	at Washburn	Topeka, KS	T 6–6	
*Non-conference game
