= 1913 Chicago Maroons football team =

American college football season

1913 Chicago Maroons football

National champion (Billingsley) Co-national champion (Davis) Western Conference champion
- Conference: Western Conference
- Record: 7–0 (7–0 Western)
- Head coach: Amos Alonzo Stagg (22nd season)
- Base defense: 7–2–2
- Home stadium: Marshall Field

1913 Western Conference football standings
	Conf.					Overall
Team	W		L		T	W		L		T
Chicago $	7	–	0	–	0	7	–	0	–	0
Iowa	2	–	1	–	0	5	–	2	–	0
Minnesota	2	–	1	–	0	5	–	2	–	0
Purdue	2	–	1	–	2	4	–	1	–	2
Illinois	2	–	2	–	1	4	–	2	–	1
Wisconsin	1	–	2	–	1	3	–	3	–	1
Ohio State	1	–	2	–	0	4	–	2	–	1
Indiana	2	–	4	–	0	3	–	4	–	0
Northwestern	0	–	6	–	0	1	–	6	–	0
$ – Conference champion

The 1913 Chicago Maroons football team was an American football team that represented the University of Chicago as a member of the Western Conference during the 1913 college football season. In coach Amos Alonzo Stagg's 22nd year as head coach, the Maroons finished with a 7–0 record and outscored opponents by a total of 124 to 27.

There was no contemporaneous system in 1913 for determining a national champion. However, Chicago was retroactively named as the 1913 national champion by the Billingsley Report and as a co-national champion by Parke H. Davis.

Center Paul Des Jardien was a consensus first-team selection on the 1913 All-America college football team. He was inducted into the College Football Hall of Fame in 1955. Other notable players on the 1913 Chicago team included halfback Nelson Norgren, quarterback Paul Russell, and end Huntington.

== Schedule ==
Date	Opponent	Site	Result	Attendance	Source
October 4	Indiana	Marshall Field; Chicago, IL	W 21–7	10,000	
October 18	Iowa	Marshall Field; Chicago, IL	W 23–6		
October 25	Purdue	Marshall Field; Chicago, IL (rivalry)	W 6–0	18,000	
November 1	Illinois	Marshall Field; Chicago, IL	W 28–7		
November 8	at Northwestern	Northwestern Field; Evanston, IL	W 14–0		
November 15	at Minnesota	Northrop Field; Minneapolis, MN	W 13–7	21,000	
November 22	Wisconsin	Marshall Field; Chicago, IL	W 19–0		
