= 1913 Washburn Ichabods football team =

American college football season

1913 Washburn Ichabods football
- Conference: Kansas College Athletic Conference
- Record: 3–3–2 (2–0–2 KCAC)
- Head coach: Glen Gray (1st season)

1913 Kansas Collegiate Athletic Conference football standings
	Conf.					Overall
Team	W		L		T	W		L		T
College of Emporia +	5	–	0	–	1	5	–	2	–	1
Southwestern (KS) +	4	–	1	–	1	6	–	1	–	1
Washburn	2	–	0	–	2	3	–	2	–	2
Kansas State	2	–	1	–	1	3	–	4	–	1
Baker	3	–	2	–	0	4	–	4	–	0
Friends	3	–	2	–	0	?	–	?	–	?
Kansas State Normal	4	–	4	–	0	4	–	6	–	0
Cooper	3	–	3	–	0	?	–	?	–	?
Pittsburg Normal	1	–	1	–	1	4	–	2	–	1
St. Mary's (KS)	2	–	3	–	0	3	–	4	–	1
Fairmount	1	–	6	–	0	2	–	6	–	1
Hays Normal	0	–	1	–	0	4	–	2	–	0
Kansas City University	0	–	2	–	0	0	–	3	–	0
Ottawa	0	–	4	–	0	1	–	4	–	0
+ – Conference co-champions

The 1913 Washburn Ichabods football team represented Washburn College—now known as Washburn University—as a member of the Kansas College Athletic Conference (KCAC) during the 1913 college football season. Led by first-year head coach Glen Gray, the Ichabods compiled an overall record of 3–3–2 with a mark of 2–0–2 in conference play, placing third in the KCAC.

== Schedule ==
Date	Time	Opponent	Site	Result	Attendance	Source
October 4	3:00 p.m.	at Nebraska*	Nebraska Field; Lincoln, NE	L 0–19		
October 18		William Jewell*	Topeka, KS	W 24–0		
October 25		Oklahoma A&M*	Stillwater, OK	L 0–3	1,500	
November 1		Kansas State Normal	Topeka, KS	W 41–7		
November 8		at Kansas*	McCook Field; Lawrence, KS	L 0–14		
November 14		at College of Emporia	Emporia, KS	T 0–0		
November 20		at Saint Mary's (KS)	St. Marys, KS	W 24–12		
November 27		Kansas State	Topeka, KS	T 6–6		
*Non-conference game
