= 1913 College of Emporia Fighting Presbies football team =

American college football season

1913 College of Emporia Fighting Presbies football

KCAC co-champion
- Conference: Kansas Collegiate Athletic Conference
- Record: 5–2–1 (5–0–1 KCAC)
- Head coach: Wayne B. Granger (1st season)
- Home stadium: College Field

1913 Kansas Collegiate Athletic Conference football standings
	Conf.					Overall
Team	W		L		T	W		L		T
College of Emporia +	5	–	0	–	1	5	–	2	–	1
Southwestern (KS) +	4	–	1	–	1	6	–	1	–	1
Washburn	2	–	0	–	2	3	–	2	–	2
Kansas State	2	–	1	–	1	3	–	4	–	1
Baker	3	–	2	–	0	4	–	4	–	0
Friends	3	–	2	–	0	?	–	?	–	?
Kansas State Normal	4	–	4	–	0	4	–	6	–	0
Cooper	3	–	3	–	0	?	–	?	–	?
Pittsburg Normal	1	–	1	–	1	4	–	2	–	1
St. Mary's (KS)	2	–	3	–	0	3	–	4	–	1
Fairmount	1	–	6	–	0	2	–	6	–	1
Hays Normal	0	–	1	–	0	4	–	2	–	0
Kansas City University	0	–	2	–	0	0	–	3	–	0
Ottawa	0	–	4	–	0	1	–	4	–	0
+ – Conference co-champions

The 1913 College of Emporia Fighting Presbies football team represented the College of Emporia as a member of the Kansas Collegiate Athletic Conference (KCAC) during the 1913 college football season. Led by first-year head coach Wayne B. Granger, the College of Emporia compiled an overall record of 5–2–1 with a mark of 5–0–1 in conference play, sharing the KCAC title with the Southwestern Moundbuilders.

Granger attended the College of Emporia, where he played football and basketball. After graduating with the class of 1913, he succeeded Homer Woodson Hargiss as the school's athletic director and coach.

== Schedule ==
Date	Opponent	Site	Result	Source
October 3	at Ottawa (KS)	Ottawa, KS	W 47–0	
October 10	Fairmount	College Field; Emporia, KS	W 25–9	
October 17	at Haskell*	Haskell Field; Lawrence, KS	L 0–60	
October 27	at St. Mary's (KS)	St. Marys, KS	W 14–12	
November 8	Baker	Emporia, KS	W 19–0	
November 14	Washburn	Emporia, KS	T 0–0	
November 21	Kansas State Normal	Emporia, KS	W 6–0	
November 28	at Colorado College*	Colorado Springs, CO	L 0–49	
*Non-conference game
