= 1913 Southwestern Moundbuilders football team =

American college football season

1913 Southwestern Moundbuilders football
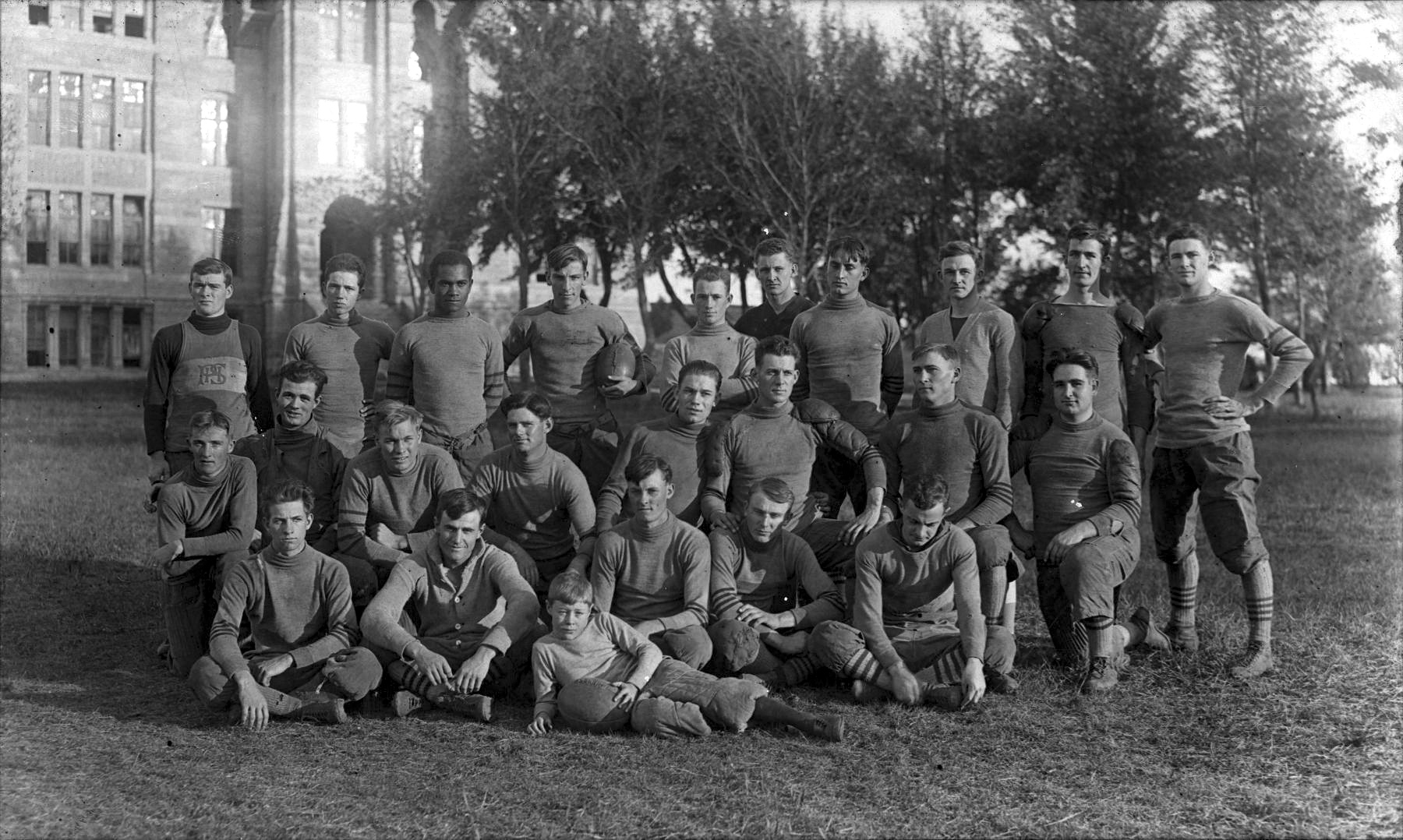

KCAC co-champion
- Conference: Kansas Collegiate Athletic Conference
- Record: 6–1–1 (4–1–1 KCAC)
- Head coach: Fred Clapp (5th season)

1913 Kansas Collegiate Athletic Conference football standings
	Conf.					Overall
Team	W		L		T	W		L		T
College of Emporia +	5	–	0	–	1	5	–	2	–	1
Southwestern (KS) +	4	–	1	–	1	6	–	1	–	1
Washburn	2	–	0	–	2	3	–	2	–	2
Kansas State	2	–	1	–	1	3	–	4	–	1
Baker	3	–	2	–	0	4	–	4	–	0
Friends	3	–	2	–	0	?	–	?	–	?
Kansas State Normal	4	–	4	–	0	4	–	6	–	0
Cooper	3	–	3	–	0	?	–	?	–	?
Pittsburg Normal	1	–	1	–	1	4	–	2	–	1
St. Mary's (KS)	2	–	3	–	0	3	–	4	–	1
Fairmount	1	–	6	–	0	2	–	6	–	1
Hays Normal	0	–	1	–	0	4	–	2	–	0
Kansas City University	0	–	2	–	0	0	–	3	–	0
Ottawa	0	–	4	–	0	1	–	4	–	0
+ – Conference co-champions

The 1913 Southwestern Moundbuilders football team represented Southwestern College in the 1913 college football season. The team won the Kansas State Championship.

Clapp fielded an African American player for his team. Kansas Normal School (now called Pittsburg State University officially launched a formal protest against the appearance of the player. In that same game, a player named Fred Hamilton was playing left halfback and was injured to the extent of having a broken neck and paralyzed arms. The game ended in a 6–6 tie.

== Schedule ==
Date	Opponent	Site	Result	Source
September 26	Oklahoma Methodist*	Winfield, KS	W 47–0	
October 3	at Kansas State	Ahearn Field; Manhattan, KS	W 13–10	
October 17	Oklahoma Tech*	Winfield, KS	W 19–13	
October 24	at Fairmount	Wichita, KS	W 29–7	
October 31	Ottawa (KS)	Winfield, KS	W 75–0	
November 6	at Kansas State Normal	Emporia, KS	L 10–28	
November	Baker		W 21–13	
November 25	at Pittsburg Normal	Pittsburg, KS	T 6–6	
*Non-conference game
