= 1913 Illinois Fighting Illini football team =

American college football season

1913 Illinois Fighting Illini football
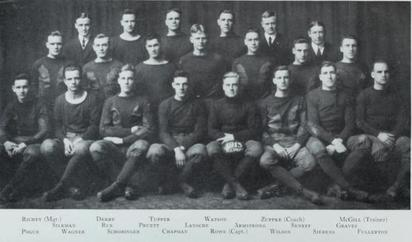
- Conference: Western Conference
- Record: 4–2–1 (2–2–1 Western)
- Head coach: Robert Zuppke (1st season)
- Captain: Enos M. Rowe
- Home stadium: Illinois Field

1913 Western Conference football standings
	Conf.					Overall
Team	W		L		T	W		L		T
Chicago $	7	–	0	–	0	7	–	0	–	0
Iowa	2	–	1	–	0	5	–	2	–	0
Minnesota	2	–	1	–	0	5	–	2	–	0
Purdue	2	–	1	–	2	4	–	1	–	2
Illinois	2	–	2	–	1	4	–	2	–	1
Wisconsin	1	–	2	–	1	3	–	3	–	1
Ohio State	1	–	2	–	0	4	–	2	–	1
Indiana	2	–	4	–	0	3	–	4	–	0
Northwestern	0	–	6	–	0	1	–	6	–	0
$ – Conference champion

The 1913 Illinois Fighting Illini football team was an American football team that represented the University of Illinois during the 1913 college football season. In their first season under head coach Robert Zuppke, the Illini compiled a 4–2–1 record and finished in fifth place in the Western Conference. Fullback Enos M. Rowe was the team captain.

== Schedule ==
Date	Opponent	Site	Result	Attendance	Source
October 4	Kentucky*	Illinois Field; Champaign, IL	W 21–0		
October 11	Missouri*	Illinois Field; Champaign, IL (rivalry)	W 24–7		
October 18	Northwestern	Illinois Field; Champaign, IL	W 37–0		
October 25	at Indiana	Washington Park; Indianapolis, IN (rivalry)	W 10–0	8,500	
November 1	at Chicago	Stagg Field; Chicago, IL	L 7–28	20,000	
November 15	Purdue^{†}	Illinois Field; Champaign, IL (rivalry)	T 0–0	7,000	
November 22	Minnesota	Illinois Field; Champaign, IL	L 9–19	3,500	
*Non-conference game; ^{†}Homecoming
