= 1913 All-Western college football team =

American all-star college football team

The 1913 All-Western college football team consists of American football players selected to the All-Western teams chosen by various selectors for the 1913 college football season. Five Western players were also selected as consensus All-Americans on the 1913 College Football All-America Team: Miller Pontius (tackle, Michigan), Ray Keeler (guard, Wisconsin), Paul Des Jardien (center, Chicago), Gus Dorais (quarterback, Notre Dame), and James B. Craig (halfback, Michigan).

== All-Western selections ==
=== Ends ===
- Lorin Solon, Minnesota (CDN-1, CON, CRH, CT, ECP-1, IO-2, WE-1)
- Knute Rockne, Notre Dame (CDN-1, CON, CT, ECP-2, IO-1, WE-1) (CFHOF)
- Clark Shaughnessy, Minnesota (CDN-2 [fullback], CRH, ECP-1 [guard]) (CFHOF)
- Blake Miller, Michigan Agricultural (ECP-1)
- Norman K. Wilson, Illinois (ECP-2)
- Earl Huntington, Chicago (CDN-2, WE-2)
- Harold Ofstie, Wisconsin (CDN-2, IO-1)
- Harold Pogue, Illinois (IO-2)
- Ralph B. Henning, Michigan Agricultural (WE-2)

=== Tackles ===
- Bob Butler, Wisconsin (CDN-1, CON, CRH, CT, ECP-1, IO-1, WE-1)
- Miller Pontius, Michigan (CDN-1, ECP-1, IO-1, WE-2) [CAA]
- Brown, South Dakota (CON, CRH)
- Vic Halligan, Nebraska (CT, WE-1)
- Archie Kirk, Iowa (ECP-2, IO-2)
- Gideon Smith, Michigan Agricultural (ECP-2)
- Chester W. Gifford, Michigan Agricultural (CDN-2, IO-2, WE-2)
- Harold Ernest Goettler, Chicago (CDN-2)

=== Guards ===
- Ernest Allmendinger, Michigan (CDN-2, CON, CRH, CT, WE-1)
- Ray Keeler, Wisconsin (CDN-2, CON, CRH, ECP-2, IO-1, WE-2) [CAA]
- Faunt V. Lenardson, Michigan Agricultural (CDN-1, CT, WE-1)
- Harris, Chicago (CDN-1, ECP-2, IO-2)
- George C. Paterson, Michigan (ECP-1)
- Boles Rosenthal, Minnesota (IO-1)
- H. B. Routh, Purdue (IO-2)
- James J. Gallagher, Missouri (WE-2)

=== Centers ===
- Paul Des Jardien, Chicago (CDN-1, CON, CRH, CT, ECP-1, IO-1, WE-1) [CAA, CFHOF]
- C. E. Glossop, Purdue (CDN-2, ECP-2)
- George C. Paterson, Michigan (IO-2)
- Al Feeney, Notre Dame (WE-2)

=== Quarterbacks ===
- Gus Dorais, Notre Dame (CDN-1, CON, CRH, CT, ECP-2, IO-1, WE-1) [CAA, CFHOF]
- Pete Russell, Chicago (ECP-1, WE-2)
- Samuel Gross, Iowa (CDN-2)
- Wilbur Hightower, Northwestern (IO-2)

=== Halfbacks ===
- James B. Craig, Michigan (CDN-1, CON, CRH, CT, ECP-1, IO-1, WE-1) [CAA]
- Nelson Norgren, Chicago (CDN-1, CON, CRH, CT, ECP-1, IO-1, WE-1)
- William McAlmon, Minnesota (ECP-2)
- Gray, Chicago (CDN-2, ECP-2)
- Miller, Michigan Agricultural (CDN-2)
- Leonard Purdy, Nebraska (IO-2)
- Elmer Oliphant, Purdue (IO-2) (CFHOF)
- Dick Rutherford, Nebraska (WE-2)
- Joe Pliska, Notre Dame (WE-2)

=== Fullbacks ===
- Ray Eichenlaub, Notre Dame (CDN-1, CON, CRH, CT, ECP-1, IO-1, WE-1) (CFHOF)
- George E. Julian, Michigan State (ECP-2, IO-2, WE-2)

== Key ==
Bold = consensus choice by a majority of the selectors

CDN = Chicago Daily News

CON = Based on "consensus of opinion of sporting writers and experts who have already picked teams"

CRH = Chicago Record-Herald by M. J. Wathey

CT = Chicago Tribune

ECP = E. C. Patterson for Collier's Weekly

IO = The Inter Ocean

WE = Walter Eckersall

CAA = Consensus All-American during the 1913 college football season

CFHOF = College Football Hall of Fame

== See also ==
- 1913 College Football All-America Team
