= 1913 Kansas Jayhawks football team =

American college football season

1913 Kansas Jayhawks football
- Conference: Missouri Valley Conference
- Record: 5–3 (3–2 MVC)
- Head coach: Arthur Mosse (2nd season)
- Captain: William D. Weidlein
- Home stadium: McCook Field

1913 Missouri Valley Conference football standings
	Conf.					Overall
Team	W		L		T	W		L		T
Missouri +	4	–	0	–	0	7	–	1	–	0
Nebraska +	3	–	0	–	0	8	–	0	–	0
Kansas	3	–	2	–	0	5	–	3	–	0
Iowa State	2	–	2	–	0	4	–	4	–	0
Drake	1	–	3	–	0	4	–	3	–	1
Kansas State	0	–	2	–	0	3	–	4	–	1
Washington University	0	–	4	–	0	1	–	5	–	0
+ – Conference co-champions

The 1913 Kansas Jayhawks football team was an American football team that represented the University of Kansas as a member of the Missouri Valley Conference (MVC) during the 1913 college football season. In their second and final season under head coach Arthur Mosse, the Jayhawks compiled a 5–3 record (3–2 against conference opponents), finished in third place in the MVC, and outscored opponents by a total of 120 to 40. The Jayhawks played their home games at McCook Field in Lawrence, Kansas. William D. Weidlein was the team captain.

== Schedule ==
Date	Time	Opponent	Site	Result	Attendance	Source
October 4		William Jewell*	McCook Field; Lawrence, KS	W 7–0	2,000	
October 11	3:30 p.m.	Washington University	McCook Field; Lawrence, KS	W 55–7		
October 18		Drake	McCook Field; Lawrence, KS	W 11–0		
October 25		at Kansas State	Ahearn Field; Manhattan, KS (rivalry)	W 26–0		
November 1		at Oklahoma*	Boyd Field; Norman, OK	L 7–21		
November 8		Washburn*	McCook Field; Lawrence, KS	W 14–0		
November 15		Nebraska^{†}	McCook Field; Lawrence, KS (rivalry)	L 0–9	10,000	
November 22		at Missouri	Rollins Field; Columbia, MO (rivalry)	L 0–3	10,000	
*Non-conference game; ^{†}Homecoming
