= 1913 Purdue Boilermakers football team =

American college football season

1913 Purdue Boilermakers football
- Conference: Western Conference
- Record: 4–1–2 (2–1–2 Western)
- Head coach: Andy Smith (1st season)
- Captain: G. E. Glossop
- Home stadium: Stuart Field

1913 Western Conference football standings
	Conf.					Overall
Team	W		L		T	W		L		T
Chicago $	7	–	0	–	0	7	–	0	–	0
Iowa	2	–	1	–	0	5	–	2	–	0
Minnesota	2	–	1	–	0	5	–	2	–	0
Purdue	2	–	1	–	2	4	–	1	–	2
Illinois	2	–	2	–	1	4	–	2	–	1
Wisconsin	1	–	2	–	1	3	–	3	–	1
Ohio State	1	–	2	–	0	4	–	2	–	1
Indiana	2	–	4	–	0	3	–	4	–	0
Northwestern	0	–	6	–	0	1	–	6	–	0
$ – Conference champion

The 1913 Purdue Boilermakers football team was an American football team that represented Purdue University during the 1913 college football season. In their first season under head coach Andy Smith, the Boilermakers compiled a 4–1–2 record, finished in fourth place in the Western Conference with a 2–1–2 record against conference opponents, and outscored their opponents by a total of 171 to 20. G. E. Glossop was the team captain.

== Schedule ==
Date	Opponent	Site	Result	Attendance	Source
October 4	Wabash*	Stuart Field; West Lafayette, IN	W 26–0		
October 11	at Northwestern	Northwestern Field; Evanston, IL	W 34–0		
October 18	Wisconsin	Stuart Field; West Lafayette, IN	T 7–7		
October 25	at Chicago	Stagg Field; Chicago, IL (rivalry)	L 0–6	18,000	
November 8	Rose Polytechnic*	Stuart Field; West Lafayette, IN	W 62–0		
November 15	at Illinois	Illinois Field; Champaign, IL (rivalry)	T 0–0		
November 22	at Indiana	Jordan Field; Bloomington, IN (Old Oaken Bucket)	W 42–7		
*Non-conference game

== Roster ==
- R. T. Abrell, HB
- H. S. Benson
- John Berns, G
- Kenneth Bishop, G
- Frank Blocker, T
- J. R. Finn, QB
- C. E. Glossop, C
- W. I. Herdrich, T
- Tom McConnell, G
- Herbert O'Brien, FB
- Elmer Oliphant, HB
- M. W. Phelps, HB
- Jim Purdy, HB
- H. B. Routh, G
- Mike Stinchfield, E
- U. V. Turner, E
- E. L. Usner, T
- C. L. Wilson
