= William P. Edmunds =

American football player and coach

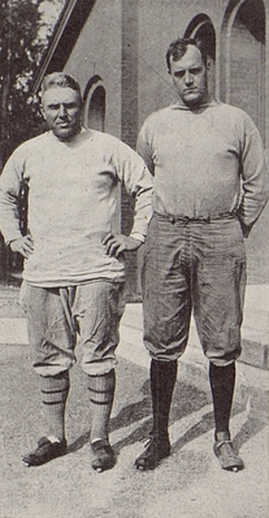
- Edmunds (right) pictured with Clyde Engle in Ariel 1921, Vermont yearbook

Biographical details
- Born: November 29, 1885; Middlesex Township, Butler County, Pennsylvania, U.S.
- Died: April 1977 (aged 91); Clearwater, Florida, U.S.

Playing career

Football
- 1908–1910: Michigan
- Position: Tackle

Coaching career (HC unless noted)

Football
- 1912: West Virginia
- 1913–1916: Washington University
- 1919: Vermont

Basketball
- 1913–1914: Washington University

Head coaching record
- Overall: 19–22–2 (football); 7–6 (basketball)

William Philip Edmunds (November 29, 1885 – April 1977) was an American football player, coach of football and basketball, college athletics administrator, and medical doctor. He played college football at the University of Michigan from 1908 to 1910. He was the head football coach at West Virginia University (1912), Washington University in St. Louis (1913–1916), and the University of Vermont (1919), compiling a career college football coach record of 19–22–2. Edmunds was also the head basketball coach at Washington University for on season in 1913–14, tallying a mark of 7–6.

== Early years ==
Edmunds was born in Middlesex Township, Butler County, Pennsylvania, in November 1885. His parents, David and Eliza Edmunds, were immigrants from Wales. At the time of the 1900 United States census, the family was living in Youngstown, Ohio.

== University of Michigan ==
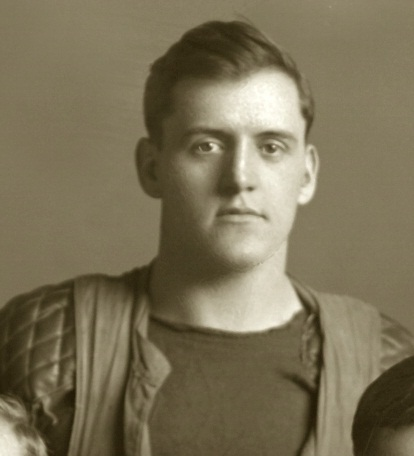
Edmunds in 1909

After growing up in Youngstown, Ohio, Edmunds attended the University of Michigan where he received a medical degree as part of the Class of 1912. While at Michigan, Edmunds played football for Fielding H. Yost on the Michigan Wolverines football team from 1908 to 1910. He started two games as a fullback for the 1908 Michigan Wolverines football team. For the 1909 team, he started two games at right guard and one at left tackle. In 1910, he started two games at left end, three at left tackle, and one at right tackle. He was selected as an All-Western Conference tackle after the 1910 season.

== Coaching and military service ==
After leaving Michigan, Edmunds served as the head football coach at West Virginia University in 1912. He led the 1912 West Virginia team to a 6–3 record.

In March 1913, Edmunds was hired as the head coach of the football, baseball, basketball and track teams at Washington University in St. Louis. He served as the head football coach there from 1913 to 1916.

With the entry of the United States into World War I, Edmunds joined the United States Army. He served as a captain in the infantry starting on August 15, 1917, from CL. He was promoted to the rank of major on September 4, 1918. He was stationed at Fort Benjamin Harrison in Indiana. He was part of the American Expeditionary Forces from June 12, 1918, to January 30, 1919. He was honorably discharged on March 4, 1919.

In September 1919, Edmunds was hired as the athletic director and coach in "all branches of athletics" at the University of Vermont. He served one year as Vermont's head football coach.

Edmunds compiled a career college football coaching record of 19–22–2.

== Later years and family ==
Edmunds was married on December 25, 1914, to Kathryn Evans at Wheatland, Pennsylvania. At the time of the 1920 United States census, Edmunds was living in Burlington, Vermont, with his wife, Kathryn. His occupation was listed as a university athletic director.

Edmunds later moved to Cleveland, Ohio, where he worked as a medical doctor. At the time of the 1930 United States census, he was living in Cleveland Heights, Ohio, with his wife, Kathryn, and their two sons, David and William. Edmunds was employed at the time as a physician for an oil corporation. In April 1942, Edmunds reported in a draft registration card that he was living in Cleveland Heights and working for the Standard Oil Co. in Cleveland.

Edmunds lived in Clearwater, Florida, in his retirement. He died there in April 1977.

== Head coaching record ==
Year	Team	Overall	Conference	Standing	Bowl/playoffs
West Virginia Mountaineers (Western Pennsylvania and West Virginia Intercollegiate Athletic Association) (1912)
1912	West Virginia	6–3	3–0	2nd	
West Virginia:		6–3	3–0		
Washington University Pikers (Missouri Valley Conference) (1913–1916)
1913	Washington University	1–5	0–4	7th	
1914	Washington University	3–3–1	0–1–1	5th	
1915	Washington University	3–2	1–1	4th	
1916	Washington University	3–3–1	0–2	7th	
Washington University:		10–13–2	1–8–1		
Vermont Green and Gold (Independent) (1919)
1919	Vermont	3–6			
Vermont:		3–6			
Total:		19–22–2			
