= 1913 Iowa Hawkeyes football team =

American college football season

1913 Iowa Hawkeyes football

Iowa state champion
- Conference: Western Conference
- Record: 5–2 (2–1 Western)
- Head coach: Jesse Hawley (4th season)
- Captain: Ralph McGinnis
- Home stadium: Iowa Field

1913 Western Conference football standings
	Conf.					Overall
Team	W		L		T	W		L		T
Chicago $	7	–	0	–	0	7	–	0	–	0
Iowa	2	–	1	–	0	5	–	2	–	0
Minnesota	2	–	1	–	0	5	–	2	–	0
Purdue	2	–	1	–	2	4	–	1	–	2
Illinois	2	–	2	–	1	4	–	2	–	1
Wisconsin	1	–	2	–	1	3	–	3	–	1
Ohio State	1	–	2	–	0	4	–	2	–	1
Indiana	2	–	4	–	0	3	–	4	–	0
Northwestern	0	–	6	–	0	1	–	6	–	0
$ – Conference champion

The 1913 Iowa Hawkeyes football team was an American football team that represented the State University of Iowa ("S.U.I."), now commonly known as the University of Iowa, as a member of the Western Conference during the 1913 college football season. In their fourth year under head coach Jesse Hawley, the Hawkeyes compiled a 5–2 record (2–1 in conference games), tied for second place in the Western Conference, and outscored opponents by a total of 310 to 51. With victories over Iowa State Teachers, Cornell (IA), and Iowa State, the Hawkeyes were recognized as the undisputed Iowa football champion.

Fullback Ralph McGinnis was the team captain. The team played its home games at Iowa Field in Iowa City, Iowa.

== Schedule ==
Date	Opponent	Site	Result	Source
October 4	Iowa State Teachers*	Iowa Field; Iowa City, IA	W 45–3	
October 6	Cornell (IA)*	Iowa Field; Iowa City, IA	W 76–0	
October 18	at Chicago	Stagg Field; Chicago, IL	L 6–23	
October 25	at Northwestern	Northwestern Field; Evanston, IL	W 78–6	
November 8	Indiana	Iowa Field; Iowa City, IA	W 60–0	
November 15	Iowa State*^{†}	Iowa Field; Iowa City, IA (rivalry)	W 45–7	
November 22	at Nebraska*	Nebraska Field; Lincoln, NE (rivalry)	L 0–12	
*Non-conference game; ^{†}Homecoming

== Players ==
The following 13 players received varsity letters for their performance on the 1913 team:

- Irving Barron
- Carl T. Bowen
- Carl Brueckner
- Joseph Carberry
- Leo Dick
- Samuel Gross
- Arthur Gunderson
- Max Houghton
- Archie Kirk
- Ralph McGinnis, captain
- Charles Parsons
- Walter Penningroth
- Max Wilson
