= 1913 Missouri Tigers football team =

American college football season

1913 Missouri Tigers football

MVC co-champion
- Conference: Missouri Valley Conference
- Record: 7–1 (.875) (4–0 (1.000) MVC)
- Head coach: Chester Brewer (3rd season)
- Captain: Charles R. Wilson
- Home stadium: Rollins Field

1913 Missouri Valley Conference football standings
	Conf.					Overall
Team	W		L		T	W		L		T
Missouri +	4	–	0	–	0	7	–	1	–	0
Nebraska +	3	–	0	–	0	8	–	0	–	0
Kansas	3	–	2	–	0	5	–	3	–	0
Iowa State	2	–	2	–	0	4	–	4	–	0
Drake	1	–	3	–	0	4	–	3	–	1
Kansas State	0	–	2	–	0	3	–	4	–	1
Washington University	0	–	4	–	0	1	–	5	–	0
+ – Conference co-champions

The 1913 Missouri Tigers football team was an American football team that represented the University of Missouri in the Missouri Valley Conference (MVC) during the 1913 college football season. The team compiled a 7–1 record (4–0 against MVC opponents), was a co-champion of the conference, and outscored all opponents by a combined total of 193 to 67. Chester Brewer was the head coach for the third of three seasons. The team played its home games at Rollins Field in Columbia, Missouri.

== Schedule ==
Date	Time	Opponent	Site	Result	Attendance	Source
October 4		Drury*	Rollins Field; Columbia, MO	W 69–0		
October 11		at Illinois*	Illinois Field; Champaign, IL (rivalry)	L 7–24		
October 18		Oklahoma*	Rollins Field; Columbia, MO (rivalry)	W 20–17		
October 25		at Iowa State	Ames, IA (rivalry)	W 21–13		
November 1		Missouri Mines*	Rollins Field; Columbia, MO	W 44–13		
November 8		Drake	Rollins Field; Columbia, MO	W 10–0		
November 15	2:30 p.m.	at Washington University	Francis Field; St. Louis, MO	W 19–0		
November 22		Kansas	Rollins Field; Columbia, MO (rivalry)	W 3–0	10,000	
*Non-conference game
