= 1913 Washington University Pikers football team =

American college football season

1913 Washington University Pikers football
- Conference: Missouri Valley Conference
- Record: 1–5 (0–4 MVC)
- Head coach: William P. Edmunds (1st season)
- Home stadium: Francis Field

1913 Missouri Valley Conference football standings
	Conf.					Overall
Team	W		L		T	W		L		T
Missouri +	4	–	0	–	0	7	–	1	–	0
Nebraska +	3	–	0	–	0	8	–	0	–	0
Kansas	3	–	2	–	0	5	–	3	–	0
Iowa State	2	–	2	–	0	4	–	4	–	0
Drake	1	–	3	–	0	4	–	3	–	1
Kansas State	0	–	2	–	0	3	–	4	–	1
Washington University	0	–	4	–	0	1	–	5	–	0
+ – Conference co-champions

The 1913 Washington University Pikers football team represented Washington University in St. Louis as a member of the Missouri Valley Conference (MVC) during the 1913 college football season. Led by first-year head coach William P. Edmunds, the Pikers compiled an overall record of 1–5 with a mark of 0–4 in conference play, placing last out of seven teams in the MVC. Washington University played home games at Francis Field in St. Louis.

== Schedule ==
Date	Time	Opponent	Site	Result	Attendance	Source
October 11	3:30 p.m.	at Kansas	McCook Field; Lawrence, KS	L 7–55		
October 18	3:00 p.m.	Iowa State	Francis Field; St. Louis, MO	L 7–37	3,000	
October 25	3:00 p.m.	Westminster (MO)*	Francis Field; St. Louis, MO	W 31–0	2,000	
November 1		at Drake	Drake Stadium; Des Moines, IA	L 17–32		
November 8	3:00 p.m.	Missouri Mines*	Francis Field; St. Louis, MO	L 3–19	4,000	
November 15	2:30 p.m.	Missouri	Francis Field; St. Louis, MO	L 0–19		
*Non-conference game
