= Paul Des Jardien =

American athlete (1893–1956)

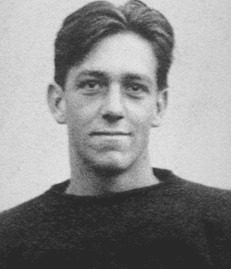
- Des Jardien, c. 1914

Profile
- Position: Center

Personal information
- Born: August 24, 1893; Coffeyville, Kansas, U.S.
- Died: March 7, 1956 (aged 62); Monrovia, California, U.S.

Career information
- College: University of Chicago

Career history
- 1920: Chicago Tigers
- 1922: Minneapolis Marines

Awards and highlights
- Second-team All-Pro (1920); Consensus All-American (1913); Second-team All-American (1914); First-team All-Service (1917); 3× First-team All-Western (1912, 1913, 1914)
- College Football Hall of Fame

Other information
- Baseball career
- Pitcher
- Batted: Right Threw: Right

MLB debut
- May 20, 1916, for the Cleveland Indians

Last MLB appearance
- May 20, 1916, for the Cleveland Indians

MLB statistics
- Games played: 1
- Earned run average: 18.00
- Stats at Baseball Reference

Teams
- Cleveland Indians (1916)

Paul Raymond "Shorty" Des Jardien (August 24, 1893 – March 7, 1956) was an American football, baseball and basketball player. He played for the University of Chicago where he was selected as the first-team All-American center in both 1913 and 1914 and also pitched a no-hitter for the baseball team. He later played professional baseball for the Cleveland Indians and professional football for the Cleveland Indians (1916), Hammond Pros (1919), Chicago Tigers (1920) and Minneapolis Marines (1922). He was inducted into the College Football Hall of Fame in 1955.

== Early years and college ==
Des Jardien was born in Coffeyville, Kansas and moved to Chicago when he was a child. He attended Chicago's Wendell Phillips Academy High School before enrolling at the University of Chicago, where he played on the Chicago Maroons' football, baseball, basketball, and track and field teams. He earned 12 varsity letters, played on Western Conference championship teams in both football and baseball, and became known as one of the best all-around athletes ever produced by the University of Chicago. While attending the University of Chicago, Des Jardien was 6 feet, 5 inches tall and weighed 190 pounds; his teammates called him "Shorty."

In baseball, Des Jardien was a pitcher, but also played at first and third base. The University of Chicago Magazine wrote: "Des Jardien at third base fields well, and adds strength by his spirit. All in all, the tall young man is one of the most excellent athletes Chicago has had in years." In May 1914, he threw a no-hitters and struck out 14 Iowa Hawkeyes batters in a game.

Des Jardien gained his greatest fame playing at the center position for Amos Alonzo Stagg's Chicago Maroons football teams from 1912 to 1914. Des Jardien played at the center position on both offense and defense, was considered "the mainstay of his team on defense," and was also known for his ability as a long punter. During Des Jardien's three years as Chicago's center, the Maroons compiled a record of 17–3–1, including an undefeated 7–0 record and Western Conference championship in 1913.

After his sophomore year in 1912, Des Jardien was selected as a first-team All-Western player. Stagg praised Des Jardien as a "spectacular" player and "as flashy a center as I have seen in many years." In naming Des Jardien to his All-Western team in 1912, E.C. Patterson in Collier's wrote: "Des Jardien is not great of bulk, at least not horizontally. He is tall and rangy and remarkably active. His usefulness is accentuated when it is seen that some of Coach Stagg's forward pass tricks center around him."

In his junior and senior years of 1913 and 1914, Des Jardien was selected as a first-team All-American. He was also chosen by his teammates as the captain of the 1914 football team. In 1914, Walter Camp wrote about Des Jardien, calling him "[...] the best center in the country — steady, reliable, absolutely dependable for his share of line work on attack, and a power on defense."

== Professional baseball and Asian tour ==
The New York Times reported in January 1915 that Des Jardien had agreed to play professional baseball for the Chicago Cubs upon graduating from the University of Chicago in June 1915. According to the report, Des Jardien declined to sign a contract with the Cubs to avoid endangering his amateur status. The report described Des Jardien as one of the best pitchers in the Western Conference, a right-hander with a good curve ball.

Instead of playing Major League Baseball in the summer of 1915, Des Jardien traveled to Asia with the University of Chicago baseball team. The team played 15 games, winning 12, while traveling to the West Coast of the United States. It sailed from San Francisco on the SS Mongolia and arrived in Honolulu, Hawaii in early September 1915, spending ten days there and playing games against teams from the U.S. Army and the St. Louis Athletic Club and teams made up of Chinese and Portuguese players. The team next sailed to Japan. On September 24, 1915, the Chicago squad played a double header in front of a crowd of 20,000 people in Tokyo. Des Jardien pitched both games, defeating Waseda 5–3 and the Keio University 4–1. Des Jardien hit a home run and struck out 11 batters in the game against the Keio. Des Jardien served as an assistant coach for the University of Chicago's basketball, baseball and track teams upon returning from Japan in January 1916.

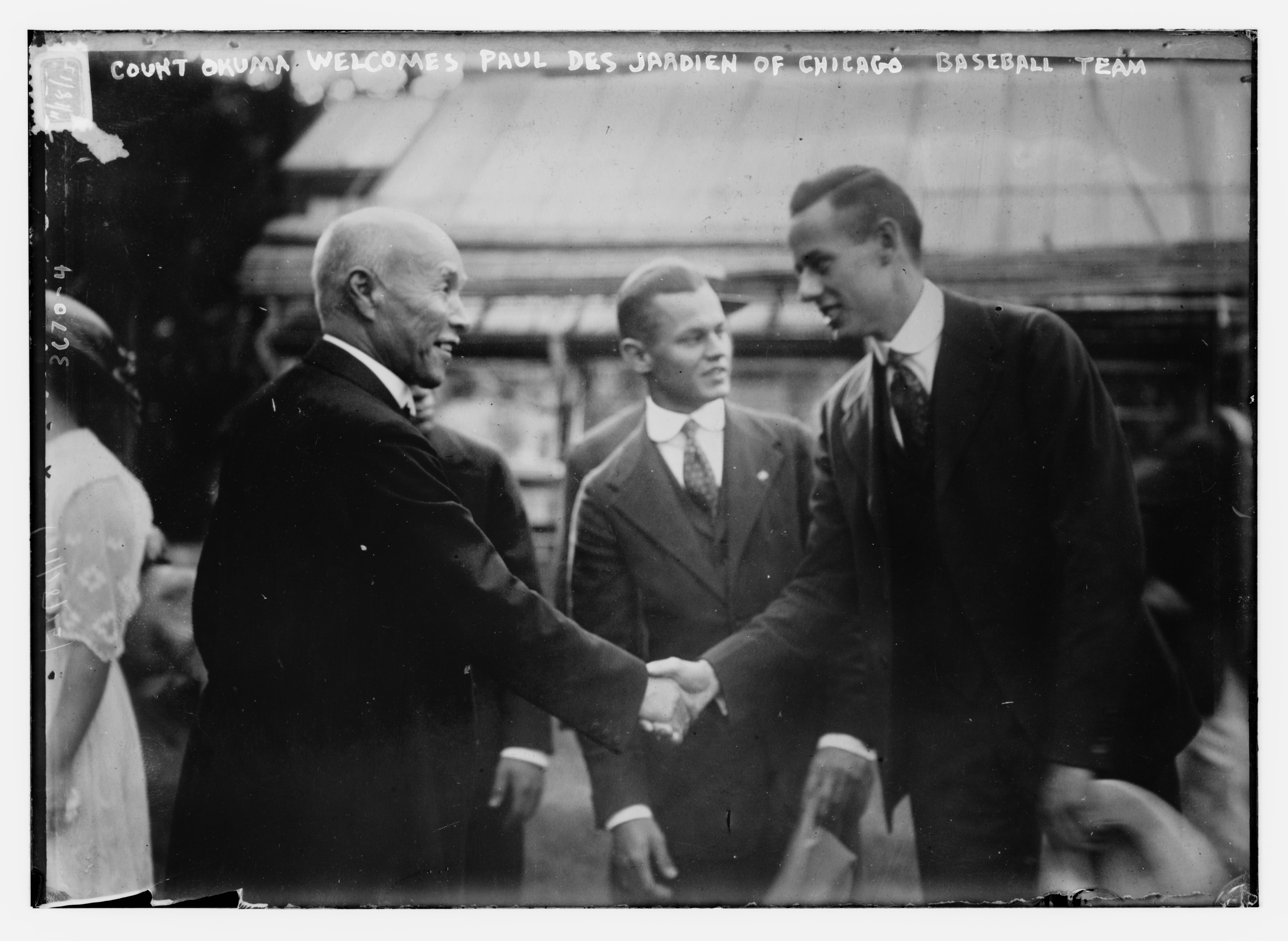
Jardien shaking hands with Japanese Prime Minister Ōkuma Shigenobu in 1915.

In early May 1916, Des Jardien signed to play Major League Baseball with the Cleveland Indians. Indians manager Lee Fohl said at the time, "I think I will make him a good pitcher. He already has learned to put more on his fast ball while his control is almost perfect." He made his debut on May 20, 1916, pitching one inning and allowing one hit, one base on balls, and two earned runs. Des Jardien did not pitch another game in Major League Baseball. In the summer of 1917, Des Jardien played semi-professional baseball with the Mohawks in the Chicago League.

== Professional football and World War I ==
In September 1916, Des Jardien was hired as the football coach at Oberlin College. With almost every veteran player missing from the football team due to a fraternity expulsion, Des Jardiens' 1916 Oberlin team failed to win a game for the first time in the program's history and scored only 13 points throughout the season.

That year, Des Jardien also played for Peggy Parratt's Cleveland Indians football team in their first and only season as a professional football team. Parratt built a team of all-stars around Des Jardien. The Indians lost two games to Jim Thorpe's Canton Bulldogs, played the Massillon Tigers to a scoreless tie, and closed the season with three wins against the Columbus Panhandles, Detroit Heralds and Toledo Maroons. Des Jardien also reportedly played professional football for the Canton Bulldogs and Fort Wayne Friars. During the 1916–17 basketball season, he played professional basketball with the Pine Village, Indiana team.

Des Jardien served in the United States Army during World War I. In the fall of 1917, he played on an Army football team at Fort Sheridan that included a number of former All-Americans including Albert Benbrook, Ernest Allmendinger, James B. Craig and Dolly Gray. In 1918, he was placed in charge of a German prison camp in Paris. After returning from France, Des Jardien played professional football for the Hammond Pros in 1919. In December 1919, P.J. Parduhn, president of the Hammond football team, was arrested on a charge of issuing bogus checks, after a complaint was lodged by Des Jardien and Milt Ghee. They dropped the charges when Parduhn agreed to make good on the payment. After the end of the football season that month, Des Jardien signed to play professional basketball with the Red Crowns team from Whiting, Indiana. The Red Crowns were backed by Standard Oil and were considered the fastest team west of Buffalo. Des Jardien's presence was expected to draw crowds from throughout the Midwest. In 1920, he played for the Chicago Tigers in the inaugural season of the National Football League, then known as the APFA. Des Jardien played in all eight games for the 1920 Tigers, including seven as the starting center. The Tigers compiled a record of 2–5–1 in 1920 and Des Jardien was selected as a second-team All-APFA player.

In October 1922, Des Jardien signed to play semi-professional football for the Ironwood Legion team from Ironwood in Michigan's Upper Peninsula. In an October 1922 game against Bessemer, Des Jardien kicked punts of 50, 55 and 65 yards. He also appeared in one game for the Minneapolis Marines in the 1922 NFL season.

== Later life ==
After retiring from athletics, Des Jardien worked as a manufacturing executive in Los Angeles. He was inducted into the College Football Hall of Fame in July 1955. He died at his home in Monrovia, California in 1956 from a cerebral thrombosis and was buried at the Forest Lawn Cemetery. Des Jardien was posthumously inducted into the University of Chicago Hall of Fame in 2006.

== Head coaching record ==
Year	Team	Overall	Conference	Standing	Bowl/playoffs
Oberlin Yeomen (Independent) (1916)
1916	Oberlin	0–7			
Oberlin:		0–7			
Total:		0–7			
