= 1913 Indiana Hoosiers football team =

American college football season

1913 Indiana Hoosiers football
- Conference: Western Conference
- Record: 3–4 (2–4 Western)
- Head coach: James M. Sheldon (9th season)
- Captain: Edgar Davis
- Home stadium: Jordan Field

1913 Western Conference football standings
	Conf.					Overall
Team	W		L		T	W		L		T
Chicago $	7	–	0	–	0	7	–	0	–	0
Iowa	2	–	1	–	0	5	–	2	–	0
Minnesota	2	–	1	–	0	5	–	2	–	0
Purdue	2	–	1	–	2	4	–	1	–	2
Illinois	2	–	2	–	1	4	–	2	–	1
Wisconsin	1	–	2	–	1	3	–	3	–	1
Ohio State	1	–	2	–	0	4	–	2	–	1
Indiana	2	–	4	–	0	3	–	4	–	0
Northwestern	0	–	6	–	0	1	–	6	–	0
$ – Conference champion

The 1913 Indiana Hoosiers football team was an American football team that represented Indiana University Bloomington during the 1913 college football season. In their ninth season under head coach James M. Sheldon, the Hoosiers compiled a 3–4 record, finished in eighth place in the Western Conference, and were outscored by their opponents by a combined total of 162 to 90.

== Schedule ==
Date	Opponent	Site	Result	Attendance	Source
September 27	DePauw*	Jordan Field; Bloomington, IN	W 48–3		
October 4	at Chicago	Stagg Field; Chicago, IL	L 7–21	10,000	
October 25	vs. Illinois	Washington Park; Indianapolis, IN (rivalry)	L 0–10	8,500	
November 1	at Ohio State	Ohio Field; Columbus, OH	W 7–6		
November 8	at Iowa	Iowa Field; Iowa City, IA	L 0–60		
November 15	at Northwestern	Northwestern Field; Evanston, IL	W 21–20		
November 22	Purdue	Jordan Field; Bloomington, IN (rivalry)	L 7–42		
*Non-conference game
