= 1913 Northwestern Purple football team =

American college football season

1913 Northwestern Purple football
- Conference: Western Conference
- Record: 1–6 (0–6 Western)
- Head coach: Dennis Grady (1st season)
- Captain: Walter Kraft
- Home stadium: Northwestern Field

1913 Western Conference football standings
	Conf.					Overall
Team	W		L		T	W		L		T
Chicago $	7	–	0	–	0	7	–	0	–	0
Iowa	2	–	1	–	0	5	–	2	–	0
Minnesota	2	–	1	–	0	5	–	2	–	0
Purdue	2	–	1	–	2	4	–	1	–	2
Illinois	2	–	2	–	1	4	–	2	–	1
Wisconsin	1	–	2	–	1	3	–	3	–	1
Ohio State	1	–	2	–	0	4	–	2	–	1
Indiana	2	–	4	–	0	3	–	4	–	0
Northwestern	0	–	6	–	0	1	–	6	–	0
$ – Conference champion

The 1913 Northwestern Purple team represented Northwestern University during the 1913 college football season. In their first and only year under head coach Dennis Grady, the Purple compiled a 1–6 record (0–6 against Western Conference opponents) and finished in last place in the Western Conference.

== Schedule ==
Date	Opponent	Site	Result	Attendance	Source
October 4	Lake Forest*	Northwestern Field; Evanston, IL	W 10–0		
October 11	Purdue	Northwestern Field; Evanston, IL	L 0–34		
October 18	at Illinois	Illinois Field; Champaign, IL (rivalry)	L 0–37		
October 25	Iowa	Northwestern Field; Evanston, IL	L 6–78		
November 8	Chicago	Northwestern Field; Evanston, IL	L 0–14		
November 15	Indiana	Northwestern Field; Evanston, IL	L 20–21		
November 22	at Ohio State	Ohio Field; Columbus, OH	L 0–58		
*Non-conference game
