= Bob Butler =

American football player (1891–1959)

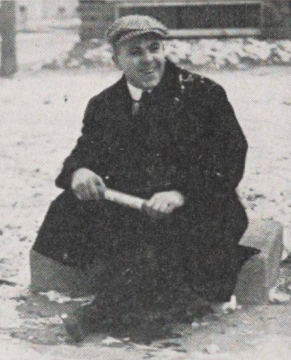
- Butler, c. 1914

Profile
- Position: Tackle / end

Personal information
- Born: April 4, 1891; Bloomfield, New Jersey, U.S.
- Died: December 17, 1959 (aged 68); Memphis, Tennessee, U.S.
- Listed height: 5 ft 10 in (1.78 m)
- Listed weight: 200 lb (91 kg)

Career information
- High school: Montclair (NJ)
- College: Wisconsin (1911–1913)

Career history
- Canton Bulldogs (1915)

Awards and highlights
- Consensus All-America Team (1912); Second-team All-American (1913); 2× First-team All-Western (1912, 1913)
- College Football Hall of Fame

Robert Parker Butler (April 4, 1891 – December 17, 1959) was an American gridiron football player best known for playing college football for the University of Wisconsin. Nicknamed "Butts", he was elected to the College Football Hall of Fame in 1972.

== Biography ==
Butler was born in 1891 in Bloomfield, New Jersey. (Note: Butler listed Bloomfield as his place of birth on his 1917 draft registration card. The College Football Hall of Fame lists Butler's birthplace as Glen Ridge, although it was not established until 1895, while his obituary listed Montclair. All three communities are in Essex County, New Jersey.) He grew up in Glen Ridge, New Jersey, and attended high school in neighboring Montclair, where he played football (as a fullback) and basketball (as a guard) as a member of the class of 1910 at Montclair High School. (Note: The College Football Hall of Fame lists Butler's high school as Glen Ridge, which is inconsistent with newspaper reports from his time as a player and at the time of his death.)

Butler played college football for the Wisconsin Badgers football team during the 1911–1913 seasons. He played as an end during his sophomore season, when the 1911 Badgers had a 5–1–1 record. Thereafter, he played as a tackle, and was selected by Walter Camp to the 1912 College Football All-America Team. Butler reportedly broke a thumb during a game early in the 1912 season, but played through the injury. The 1912 Badgers posted a 7–0 record, finishing atop the Western Conference standings. The 1913 Badgers slipped to a 3–3–1 record, while some selectors again named Butler to the 1913 College Football All-America Team. Butler was also selected to the All-Western college football teams of 1912 and 1913.

In 1915, Butler was recruited by Jack Cusack, manager of the Canton Bulldogs of the Ohio League (a predecessor of the National Football League), to bolster the Bulldogs' roster in their final game of the season, against the rival Massillon Tigers. The Bulldogs, who had lost to the Tigers two weeks earlier, 16–0, won the rematch, 6–0, with all of Canton's points scored by Jim Thorpe.

Butler married Lillian Eastlund, a fellow graduate of the University of Wisconsin, on December 31, 1918. Butler moved to Memphis, Tennessee, in 1927. At the time of his death at his Memphis home in 1959, he was operating a commercial chicken hatchery there. He was survived by his wife and a daughter.

In 1972, Butler was inducted to the College Football Hall of Fame. In 1992, he was inducted to the athletic hall of fame at the University of Wisconsin.

== Sources ==
- Peterson, Robert W. (1996). Pigskin: The Early Years of Pro Football. Oxford University Press. ISBN 978-0195076073.
