= Braggin' Rights =

American college basketball rivalry

- Illinois Fighting Illini Missouri Tigers
- Sport: Basketball
- First meeting: December 21, 1932; Illinois 36, Missouri 24
- Latest meeting: December 22, 2025; Illinois 91, Missouri 48
- Next meeting: December 20, 2026
- Stadiums: Enterprise Center

Statistics
- Total meetings: 56
- All-time series: Illinois leads, 36–20
- Largest victory: Illinois, 43 points (2025)
- Longest win streak: Illinois, 9 (2000–2008)
- Current win streak: Illinois, 3 (2023–present)

Locations of Illinois and Missouri

Braggin' Rights (known for sponsorship reasons as McBride Homes Braggin' Rights, previously Busch Braggin' Rights) is the annual men's college basketball contest between the University of Illinois Fighting Illini of the Big Ten Conference and University of Missouri Tigers of the SEC.

== History ==
Before 1976, the Tigers and the Illini met sporadically. The official first meeting between the two schools occurred on December 21, 1932, where the Tigers hosted the Illini at Brewer Fieldhouse. Illini head coach Craig Ruby, a former star and coach at Mizzou, led his team to victory, 36–24. The following year, the Illini hosted the Tigers at Huff Hall, winning again by 36–24. Over the next half-century, the two teams met ten more times, culminating with a back-and-forth series called the Show-Me Classic. This event began in December 1976 in Columbia, Missouri, at the Hearnes Center, where Missouri defeated Illinois, 76–75. Over the next three years (1977–79) the two teams reciprocated home courts.

This series was replaced by the Braggin' Rights series on a neutral court sponsored by Anheuser-Busch for the 1980–81 season, with the game moving to St. Louis, Missouri, during the month of December. From 1980 to 1993 (excluding 1982), it was played at the St. Louis Arena (originally known as the Checkerdome when the series started), and since 1994, it has been played at Enterprise Center. St. Louis is within convenient driving distance of the two schools' home cities of Columbia, Missouri (2 hours), and Champaign, Illinois (3 hours); many students at both schools come from the area; both schools have a large alumni base in greater St. Louis; and the Enterprise Center has a larger capacity than either school's home arena (State Farm Center for Illinois and Mizzou Arena for Missouri). It is traditionally held over the students' holiday break near the end of December and is nationally televised. One of the most closely contested games in the series was the final game held at the St. Louis Arena on December 22, 1993. Missouri defeated Illinois 108–107 in a game that lasted three overtimes.

Before 2000, the series was fairly evenly matched, with Illinois leading the series 11–8 before the game held in 2000. However, the Illini went on a decade-long winning streak under Bill Self and Bruce Weber, while at the same time Missouri basketball floundered with Quin Snyder as coach. Tiger fan frustration with not being able to win one of their marquee games boiled over so much that in Snyder's final game, an 82-50 drubbing in 2005, one fan threw a full tub of popcorn on him while he was exiting the arena. Since hiring Mike Anderson in 2006, though, Missouri's fortunes took an upward turn, culminating in an emphatic win in 2009 with the Enterprise Center playing Prince's "1999" following the victory, as a sly reference to the last time Missouri had won in St. Louis.

Due to the Coronavirus Pandemic, it was decided that the 2020 Braggin' Rights game would not be held at the Enterprise Center, but rather at one of the teams' home stadiums. A coin flip, performed by Andy Katz, took place on November 12, 2020, that determined Missouri would host the December 12, 2020 game. The game returned to the Enterprise Center the following year. Prior to the 2023 edition, it was announced the series would continue at the Enterprise Center through 2029.

The name of the victorious team is engraved on a large trophy that, unlike other college rivalry trophies, does not travel home with the winning team. The trophy is displayed in a glass case in the Enterprise Center lobby, where it occupies either an orange-and-blue or black-and-gold space in the cabinet, depending on who won. The other side has a plastic square reading "THE TROPHY BELONGS HERE NEXT YEAR" in the position where the trophy would go.

Other Mizzou and Illini teams now play Braggin' Rights games, most notably football.

== Accomplishments by the two rivals ==
The following summarizes the accomplishments of the two programs.

Team	Illinois	Missouri
Seasons played	118	117
Championship appearances	1	0
Final Four appearances	6	0
NCAA Tournament appearances	36	31
NCAA Tournament record	42-34	23-29
Consensus First Team All-Americans	16	5
Naismith Players of the Year	0	0
All-time program record	1876-1054	1708-1223
All-time winning percentage	.640	.583

- Through March 18, 2023

== Game results ==
=== Games with both teams ranked ===
(Rankings are from AP Poll)

Winning team is shown. Ranking of the team at the time of the game by the AP poll is shown under the team name.

Date	Illinois rank	Missouri rank	Winner	Score
December 19, 1988	6	10	Illinois	87–84
December 20, 1989	5	4	Illinois	101–93
December 20, 1995	14	15	Illinois	96–85^{OT}
December 22, 2001	9	8	Illinois	72–61
December 21, 2002	12	11	Illinois	85–70
December 23, 2003	21	11	Illinois	71–70
December 22, 2010	21	9	Missouri	75–64
December 22, 2011	25	9	Missouri	78–74
December 22, 2012	10	12	Missouri	82–73

=== Series results ===
Winning team is shown. Ranking of the team at the time of the game by the AP poll is shown by the team name. Rankings are from the AP Poll (1936–present)

Illinois victories	Missouri victories	Tie games

No.	Date	Location	Winner	Score
1	December 21, 1932	Brewer Fieldhouse	Illinois	36–24
2	January 3, 1934	Huff Hall	Illinois	36–24
3	December 14, 1942	Huff Hall	Illinois	51–30
4	December 18, 1943	Brewer Fieldhouse	Illinois	39–29
5	December 16, 1946	Municipal Auditorium	Missouri	55–50
6	December 4, 1954	Huff Hall	Illinois	77–49
7	December 10, 1955	Brewer Fieldhouse	Missouri	74–73
8	December 3, 1976	Hearnes Center	Missouri	76–75
9	December 6, 1977	Assembly Hall	Illinois	96–85
10	December 5, 1978	Hearnes Center	Illinois	69–57
11	December 4, 1979	Assembly Hall	Missouri	67–66
12	December 10, 1980	Checkerdome	Illinois	84–62
13	December 8, 1981	Checkerdome	No. 13 Missouri	78–68^{OT}
14	December 28, 1983	St. Louis Arena	Illinois	66–60
15	December 6, 1984	St. Louis Arena	No. 7 Illinois	65–50
16	December 21, 1985	St. Louis Arena	No. 15 Illinois	67–55
17	December 23, 1986	St. Louis Arena	No. 9 Illinois	92–74
18	December 22, 1987	St. Louis Arena	Illinois	75–63
19	December 19, 1988	St. Louis Arena	No. 6 Illinois	87–84
20	December 20, 1989	St. Louis Arena	No. 5 Illinois	101–93
21	December 19, 1990	St. Louis Arena	Illinois	84–81
22	December 23, 1991	St. Louis Arena	No. 16 Missouri	61–44
23	December 23, 1992	St. Louis Arena	Missouri	66–65
24	December 22, 1993	St. Louis Arena	Missouri	108–107^{3OT}
25	December 22, 1994	Kiel Center	Missouri	76–58
26	December 20, 1995	Kiel Center	No. 14 Illinois	96–85^{OT}
27	December 28, 1996	Kiel Center	Illinois	85–69
28	December 23, 1997	Kiel Center	Missouri	75–69
29	December 22, 1998	Kiel Center	Missouri	67–62

No.	Date	Location	Winner	Score
30	December 21, 1999	Kiel Center	Missouri	78–72
31	December 21, 2000	Kiel Center	No. 5 Illinois	86–81^{OT}
32	December 22, 2001	Savvis Center	No. 9 Illinois	72–61
33	December 21, 2002	Savvis Center	No. 12 Illinois	85–70
34	December 23, 2003	Savvis Center	No. 21 Illinois	71–70
35	December 23, 2004	Savvis Center	No. 1 Illinois	70–64
36	December 21, 2005	Savvis Center	No. 6 Illinois	82–50
37	December 19, 2006	Scottrade Center	Illinois	73–70
38	December 22, 2007	Scottrade Center	Illinois	59–58
39	December 23, 2008	Scottrade Center	Illinois	75–59
40	December 23, 2009	Scottrade Center	Missouri	81–68
41	December 22, 2010	Scottrade Center	No. 9 Missouri	75–64
42	December 22, 2011	Scottrade Center	No. 9 Missouri	78–74
43	December 22, 2012	Scottrade Center	No. 12 Missouri	82–73
44	December 21, 2013	Scottrade Center	Illinois	65–64
45	December 20, 2014	Scottrade Center	Illinois	62–59
46	December 23, 2015	Scottrade Center	Illinois	68–63
47	December 21, 2016	Scottrade Center	Illinois	75–66
48	December 23, 2017	Scottrade Center	Illinois	70–64
49	December 22, 2018	Enterprise Center	Missouri	79–63
50	December 21, 2019	Enterprise Center	Missouri	63–56
51	December 12, 2020	Mizzou Arena	Missouri	81–78
52	December 22, 2021	Enterprise Center	Illinois	88–63
53	December 22, 2022	Enterprise Center	Missouri	93–71
54	December 22, 2023	Enterprise Center	No. 13 Illinois	97–73
55	December 22, 2024	Enterprise Center	Illinois	80–77
56	December 22, 2025	Enterprise Center	No. 20 Illinois	91–48
Series: Illinois leads 36–20

== Series statistics ==
- Series Record: Illinois leads 36 to 20
- Current Streak: Illinois, 3 wins
- Illinois when ranked: 14–7
- Missouri when ranked: 5–10
- When both teams are ranked: Illinois leads 6–3
- Illinois when unranked: 22–13
- Missouri when unranked: 15–26
- When both teams are unranked: Illinois leads 18–11
- In overtime games: Tied 2–2
- At Brewer Fieldhouse: Illinois led 2–1
- At Huff Hall: Illinois led 3–0
- At Municipal Center: Missouri led 1–0
- At Hearnes Center: Tied 1–1
- At Assembly Hall: Tied 1–1
- At St. Louis Arena: Illinois led 9–4
- At Enterprise Center: Illinois leads 20–11
- At Mizzou Arena: Missouri leads 1–0
- Illinois' longest winning streak: 9 (2000–08)
- Missouri's longest winning streak: 4 (1991–94, 2009–12)
- Illinois' largest winning margin: 43 points (2025)
- Missouri's largest winning margin: 22 points (2022)
- Closest margin: 1 point, four times in regulation (1992, 2003, 2007, 2013) and once in triple overtime (1993)

== See also ==
- Illinois–Missouri football rivalry
