= 1913 Ohio State Buckeyes football team =

American college football season

1913 Ohio State Buckeyes football
- Conference: Western Conference, Ohio Athletic Conference
- Record: 4–2–1 (1–2 Western, 3–0–1 OAC)
- Head coach: John Wilce (1st season)
- Home stadium: Ohio Field

1913 Western Conference football standings
| | Conf. | | | | | Overall |
| Team | W | | L | | T | W | | L | | T |
|---|---|---|---|---|---|---|---|---|---|---|
| Chicago $ | 7 | – | 0 | – | 0 | 7 | – | 0 | – | 0 |
| Iowa | 2 | – | 1 | – | 0 | 5 | – | 2 | – | 0 |
| Minnesota | 2 | – | 1 | – | 0 | 5 | – | 2 | – | 0 |
| Purdue | 2 | – | 1 | – | 2 | 4 | – | 1 | – | 2 |
| Illinois | 2 | – | 2 | – | 1 | 4 | – | 2 | – | 1 |
| Wisconsin | 1 | – | 2 | – | 1 | 3 | – | 3 | – | 1 |
| Ohio State | 1 | – | 2 | – | 0 | 4 | – | 2 | – | 1 |
| Indiana | 2 | – | 4 | – | 0 | 3 | – | 4 | – | 0 |
| Northwestern | 0 | – | 6 | – | 0 | 1 | – | 6 | – | 0 |
$ – Conference champion

1913 Ohio Athletic Conference football standings
| | Conf. | | | | | Overall |
| Team | W | | L | | T | W | | L | | T |
|---|---|---|---|---|---|---|---|---|---|---|
| Oberlin $ | 5 | – | 0 | – | 1 | 6 | – | 1 | – | 1 |
| Ohio State | 3 | – | 0 | – | 1 | 4 | – | 2 | – | 1 |
| Denison | 4 | – | 1 | – | 0 | 5 | – | 2 | – | 0 |
| Miami (OH) | 4 | – | 2 | – | 0 | 6 | – | 2 | – | 0 |
| Cincinnati | 4 | – | 2 | – | 1 | 5 | – | 3 | – | 1 |
| Western Reserve | 3 | – | 2 | – | 1 | 4 | – | 4 | – | 1 |
| Case | 3 | – | 3 | – | 0 | 4 | – | 5 | – | 0 |
| Kenyon | 1 | – | 3 | – | 1 | 5 | – | 3 | – | 1 |
| Wooster | 1 | – | 3 | – | 1 | 2 | – | 3 | – | 2 |
| Ohio | 1 | – | 3 | – | 0 | 2 | – | 5 | – | 1 |
| Ohio Wesleyan | 1 | – | 6 | – | 0 | 2 | – | 7 | – | 0 |
| Wittenberg | 0 | – | 5 | – | 0 | 3 | – | 7 | – | 0 |
$ – Conference champion

The 1913 Ohio State Buckeyes football team represented Ohio State University as a member of the Western Conference and the Ohio Athletic Conference (OAC) during the 1913 college football season. Led by first-year head coach, John Wilce, the Buckeyes compiled an overall record of 4–2–1 and outscored opponents 154–27. Ohio State had a record of 1–2 against Western Conference opponents and 3–0–1 in OAC play.

Their inaugural Big Ten season marked Ohio State's first ever matchups with Northwestern and Wisconsin. The game against Indiana was their sixth all-time meeting and their first game against the Hoosiers as conference-mates.

== Schedule ==
| Date | Opponent | Site | Result | Attendance | Source |
|---|---|---|---|---|---|
| October 4 | Ohio Wesleyan* | Ohio Field; Columbus, OH | W 58–0 | 3,500 | |
| October 11 | Western Reserve* | Ohio Field; Columbus, OH | W 14–8 | | |
| October 18 | Oberlin* | Ohio Field; Columbus, OH | T 0–0 | | |
| November 1 | Indiana | Ohio Field; Columbus, OH | L 6–7 | | |
| November 8 | at Wisconsin | Randall Field; Madison, WI | L 0–12 | | |
| November 15 | Case* | Ohio Field; Columbus, OH | W 18–0 | | |
| November 22 | Northwestern | Ohio Field; Columbus, OH | W 58–0 | | |

== Coaching staff ==
- John Wilce, head coach, first year
