= Eddie Gillette =

American football player and coach

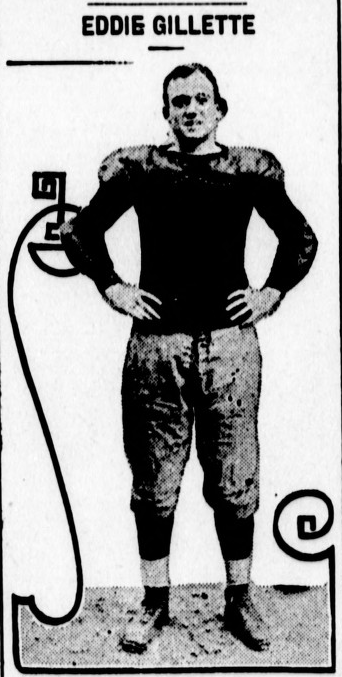
- Eddie Gillette

Wisconsin Badgers
- Positions: Halfback, Quarterback

Personal information
- Born: c. 1892

Career information
- College: University of Wisconsin (1910–1912)

Awards and highlights
- First-team All-Western (1912)

Edmund "Eddie" Gillette (born c. 1892) was an American football player and coach. He played halfback and quarterback for the University of Wisconsin and was selected as an All-American at the quarterback position in 1912.

== Biography ==
A native of Aurora, Illinois, Gillette attended the University of Wisconsin where he played halfback and quarterback for the Badgers football team. While at Wisconsin, Gillette also played varsity baseball and "was a ten and two-fifths man" on the track team. In all, Gillette received seven "W"'s while attending the University of Wisconsin.

=== 1910 season ===
As a sophomore in 1910, Gillette played principally at halfback for the Badgers. As the season progressed, Gillette gained attention for his "speed and dodging ability." It was reported that he "displayed so much promise" that special plays were built for him. In a late November 1910 rivalry game against the University of Chicago, Gillette starred for Wisconsin in a 10–0 win. In the fourth quarter of a close game, newspaper accounts report that "Gillette, in two magnificent runs, took the ball over for the second touchdown for Wisconsin." One newspaper wrote that Gillette's "run of 70 yards through a broken field [in the 1910 Chicago game] was one of the best ever seen on Camp Randall."

=== 1911 season ===
At the end of the 1911 football season, Gillette became embroiled in an eligibility dispute involving charges by Coach Henry L. Williams of the University of Minnesota. Minnesota charged that several Wisconsin players, including Gillette, had played professional baseball during the summer. The charge involving Gillette was that he had played first base on one of the commercial league teams at Madison where admission was charged at the gate. After an investigation, it was determined that Gillette's eligibility to play in 1912 was intact.

=== 1912 season ===
As quarterback of the 1912 team, Gillette led the school to a Western Conference championship. As the season progressed, newspapers touted Gillette as one of the best football players in the country. Gillette scored touchdowns on long runs of 90 yards against Northwestern and 60 and 55 yards against Purdue. In the final game of the 1912 season, Wisconsin defeated Iowa by a score of 28–10 in Iowa City. Gillette scored the first touchdown of the game circling around the Iowa end for a gain of 50 yards. Gillette threw for another touchdown in the third quarter, passing the ball into the endzone from the eight-yard line.

The 1912 Badgers outscored their opponents 246 to 29 and finished the year with a perfect 7–0 record as follows:

- 10-05-1912: 13–0 win over Lawrence (WI)
- 10-12-1912: 56–0 win over Northwestern
- 10-19-1912: 41–0 win over Purdue
- 11-02-1912: 30–12 win over Chicago
- 11-09-1912: 64–7 win over Arkansas
- 11-16-1912: 14–0 win over Minnesota
- 11-23-1912: 28–10 win over Iowa

One syndicated article on Gillette reported:

"Western football critics are of the opinion that if Eddie Gillette, the Badgers' star quarterback keeps up his brilliant work he will surely be the selection for the position on the mythical All-American eleven. No quarterback in the East or West has performed as well as Wisconsin's signal giver. In the game with Northwestern which the Badgers won by the score of 56 to 0, Gillette was the bright star. His ninety yard run in the last period of the game through the entire purple team was the most brilliant play of the game. Near the close of the first quarter Gillette broke away for a fifty yard run, carrying the ball to Northwestern's twenty yard line. ... In the game with Purdue, Gillette was the individual star. His most brilliant accomplishment was a sixty five yard run for a touchdown at the opening of the second quarter."

At the end of the 1912 season, Gillette was selected as a first-team All-American quarterback by syndicated sports writer Tommy Clark and Alfred S. Harvey of the Milwaukee Free Press. He was also unanimously selected as the first-team quarterback by the various experts picking All-Western teams, including Walter Eckersall, the Chicago Record-Herald, the Milwaukee Free Press, and the Milwaukee Sentinel.

When Gillette was completely omitted from the All-American teams selected by Eastern football expert Walter Camp (whose omission of Western players was an ongoing subject of controversy), Wisconsin supporters "sneered at the idea that Camp had found three better quarterbacks than Wisconsin's brilliant Eddie Gillette." One writer described Gillette's contributions in 1912 as follows:

"Eddie Gillette, Wisconsin's great quarterback, is rated as one of the best who has ever been seen in the west and he has been on every All-Conference and All-Western team which has been picked. The Badger star played his first year at quarter this fall having previously been a halfback and he more than made good, proving to be a great ___ a good field general and a reliable and brilliant man to carry the ball. Gillette's playing should entitle him to a place on the All-American as he seems to be better than any quarterback on any of the eastern elevens."

=== Later life ===
In 1913, after graduating from Wisconsin, he was hired as a coach at Louisville Manual Training School. In 1914, he was hired as the coach at Batavia High School in Batavia, Illinois. As of January 1915, Gillette was assistant engineer of the Aurora, Elgin & Chicago railroad. At that time, he was reported to be in negotiations with Joe Tinker to play as a pitcher for Tinker's Chicago Whales baseball team in the Federal League. After graduating from Wisconsin in 1913, Gillette pitched many games for Illinois teams and "beat some of the best pitchers in the 'Three-Eye League'."

== See also ==
- 1912 College Football All-America Team
