= Homer C. Hubbard =

American sports coach (1885–1955)

Biographical details
- Born: October 14, 1885; Ida Grove, Iowa, U.S.
- Died: August 7, 1955 (aged 69); Sheldon, Iowa, U.S.

Playing career

Football
- 1905–1908: Iowa State
- Positions: Halfback, quarterback

Coaching career (HC unless noted)

Football
- 1913–1914: Iowa State

Basketball
- 1911–1915: Iowa State

Baseball
- 1913–1915: Iowa State

Head coaching record
- Overall: 8–7 (football); 21–41 (basketball); 18–18–2 (baseball)

Homer Colcord Hubbard (October 14, 1885 – August 7, 1955) was an American football, basketball, and baseball coach. He was the ninth head football coach at Iowa State University in Ames, Iowa, serving for two seasons, from 1913 to 1914, and compiling a record of 8–7. Hubbard was also the school's head basketball coach from 1911 to 1915, tallying a mark of 21–41.

Hubbard later opened up an automotive service business in Sheldon, Iowa. He died in Sheldon in 1955.

== Head coaching record ==
=== Football ===
Year	Team	Overall	Conference	Standing	Bowl/playoffs
Iowa State Cyclones (Missouri Valley Intercollegiate Athletic Association) (1913–1914)
1913	Iowa State	4–4	2–2	4th	
1914	Iowa State	4–3	2–1	3rd	
Iowa State:		8–7	4–3		
Total:		8–7			
