= Dennis Grady =

American football, basketball, and baseball coach

Biographical details
- Born: December 7, 1886; Lafayette, Indiana, U.S.
- Died: July 10, 1974 (aged 87); Los Angeles County, California, U.S.

Playing career
- ?: DePauw

Coaching career (HC unless noted)

Football
- 1910–1911: Alma
- 1913: Northwestern

Basketball
- 1911–1912: Alma
- 1912–1914: Northwestern

Baseball
- 1913: Northwestern

Head coaching record
- Overall: 8–12 (football); 29–16 (basketball); 6–6 (baseball)

Accomplishments and honors

Championships
- Football; 1 MIAA (1910)

Dennis Henry Grady (December 7, 1886 – July 10, 1974) was an American college football, college basketball, and college baseball coach. He served as the head football coach at Alma College from 1910 to 1911 and at Northwestern University in 1913, compiling a career college football coaching record of 8–12. Grady's football coaching record at Northwestern was 1–6. Grady was also the fifth head basketball coach for Northwestern, coaching two seasons from 1912 to 1914 and tallying a mark of 25–10.

== Head coaching record ==
=== Football ===
| Year | Team | Overall | Conference | Standing | Bowl/playoffs |
|---|---|---|---|---|---|
Alma Maroon and Cream (Michigan Intercollegiate Athletic Association) (1910–1911)
| 1910 | Alma | 4–2 | 1–0 | 1st | |
| 1911 | Alma | 3–4 | | | |
| Alma: | | 7–6 | | | |
Northwestern Purple (Western Conference) (1913)
| 1913 | Northwestern | 1–6 | 0–6 | 9th | |
| Northwestern: | | 1–6 | 0–6 | | |
| Total: | | 8–12 | | | |
National championship Conference title Conference division title or championship game berth
