= Harold Ofstie =

American football player and coach (1891–1961)

Biographical details
- Born: May 5, 1891; Appleton, Minnesota, U.S.
- Died: June 17, 1961 (aged 70); Everett, Washington, U.S.

Playing career

Football
- 1911–1913: Wisconsin
- Position: End

Coaching career (HC unless noted)

Football
- 1914: Wisconsin (freshmen)
- 1915–1916: Ripon
- 1921: USC (freshmen)
- 1922: Mississippi A&M (assistant)
- 1923: Great Lakes Navy
- 1924: Centre (assistant)
- 1926–1927: Centre

Basketball
- 1915–1917: Ripon
- 1924–1925: Centre

Track
- 1924–1925: Centre

Accomplishments and honors

Awards
- All-Western (1913)

Harold Sigvald "Hod" Ofstie (May 5, 1891 – June 17, 1961) was an American college football player and coach. He served as the head football coach at Ripon College in Ripon, Wisconsin from 1915 to 1916 and at Centre College in Danville, Kentucky from 1926 to 1927.

Ofstie served as a lieutenant in the United States Army during World War I. He died on June 17, 1961.

== Head coaching record ==
=== Football ===
Year	Team	Overall	Conference	Standing	Bowl/playoffs
Ripon Crimson (Independent) (1915–1916)
1915	Ripon	7–0–1			
1916	Ripon	6–1			
Ripon:		13–1–1			
Centre Colonels (Southern Intercollegiate Athletic Association) (1926–1927)
1926	Centre	3–4–2	2–1–2	T–11th	
1927	Centre	3–6	2–3	T–13th	
Centre:		6–10–2	4–4–2		
Total:					
