= 1913 Nebraska Cornhuskers football team =

American college football season

1913 Nebraska Cornhuskers football
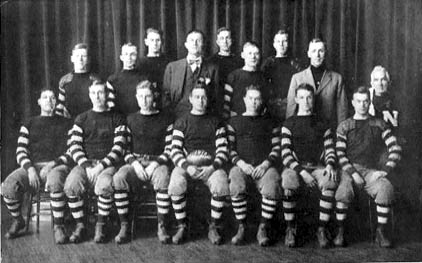

MVC co-champion
- Conference: Missouri Valley Conference
- Record: 8–0 (3–0 MVC)
- Head coach: Ewald O. Stiehm (3rd season)
- Home stadium: Nebraska Field

1913 Missouri Valley Conference football standings
	Conf.					Overall
Team	W		L		T	W		L		T
Missouri +	4	–	0	–	0	7	–	1	–	0
Nebraska +	3	–	0	–	0	8	–	0	–	0
Kansas	3	–	2	–	0	5	–	3	–	0
Iowa State	2	–	2	–	0	4	–	4	–	0
Drake	1	–	3	–	0	4	–	3	–	1
Kansas State	0	–	2	–	0	3	–	4	–	1
Washington University	0	–	4	–	0	1	–	5	–	0
+ – Conference co-champions

The 1913 Nebraska Cornhuskers football team represented the University of Nebraska as a member of the Missouri Valley Conference (MVC) during the 1913 college football season. The team was coached by third-year head coach Ewald O. Stiehm and played its home games at Nebraska Field in Lincoln, Nebraska. The 1913 season was part of Nebraska's 34-game unbeaten streak that ran from 1912 to 1916. This was the first season that Nebraska conducted a spring football practice session.

== Schedule ==
Date	Time	Opponent	Site	Result	Attendance	Source
October 4	3:00 p.m.	Washburn*	Nebraska Field; Lincoln, NE	W 19–0		
October 11	3:00 p.m.	Kansas State	Nebraska Field; Lincoln, NE (rivalry)	W 24–6		
October 18	3:00 p.m.	Minnesota*^{†}	Nebraska Field; Lincoln, NE (rivalry)	W 7–0	9,000	
October 25	3:00 p.m.	Haskell*	Nebraska Field; Lincoln, NE	W 7–6		
November 1	3:00 p.m.	at Iowa State	State Field; Ames, IA (rivalry)	W 18–9		
November 8	3:00 p.m.	Nebraska Wesleyan*	Nebraska Field; Lincoln, NE	W 42–7		
November 15	2:45 p.m.	at Kansas	Central Park; Lawrence, KS (rivalry)	W 9–0		
November 22	3:00 p.m.	Iowa*	Nebraska Field; Lincoln, NE (rivalry)	W 12–0		
*Non-conference game; ^{†}Homecoming

== Coaching staff ==
Coach	Position	First year	Alma mater
Ewald O. Stiehm	Head coach	1911	Wisconsin
Jack Best	Trainer	1890	Nebraska
Haarman	First assistant coach	1913	
Dudley	Assistant coach	1913	

== Roster ==
Abbott, Earl RG
Balis, Arthur E
Beck, Charles E
Cameron, Robert RT
Elwell, John HB
Freitag, Albert G
Halligan, Vic LT
Howard, Warren FB
Mastin, Guy E
Mulligan, Harold E
Pearson, Monte LT
Purdy, Leonard HB
Ross, Clinton RG
Rutherford, Richard HB
Shields, Paul G
Thompson, Robert C
Towle, Max QB

Starters

Position	Player
Quarterback	Max Towle
Left Halfback	Richard Rutherford
Right Halfback	Leonard Purdy
Fullback	Warren Howard
Left End	Charles Beck
Left Tackle	Vic Halligan
Left Guard	Clinton Ross
Center	Robert Thompson
Right Guard	Earl Abbott
Right Tackle	Arthur Bailes
Right End	Guy Mastin

== Game summaries ==
=== Washburn ===
Washburn at Nebraska

Team	1	2	Total
Washburn			0
• Nebraska			19

- Date: October 4
- Location: Nebraska Field, Lincoln, NE
- Game start: 3:00 p.m.

=== Kansas State ===
Kansas State at Nebraska

Team	1	2	Total
Kansas State			6
• Nebraska			24

- Date: October 11
- Location: Nebraska Field, Lincoln, NE
- Game start: 3:00 p.m.

=== Minnesota ===
Minnesota at Nebraska

Team	1	2	3	4	Total
Minnesota	0	0	0	0	0
• Nebraska	0	0	7	0	7

- Date: October 18
- Location: Nebraska Field, Lincoln, NE
- Game start: 3:00 p.m.

Nebraska used a second-half touchdown to win for just the second time against Minnesota in 13 meetings. Minnesota coach Henry L. Williams said after the game "I cannot say I expected the Gophers to be defeated. Nebraska has a great team."

=== Haskell ===
Haskell at Nebraska

Team	1	2	Total
Haskell			6
• Nebraska			7

- Date: October 25
- Location: Nebraska Field, Lincoln, NE
- Game start: 3:00 p.m.

=== At Iowa State ===
Nebraska at Iowa State

Team	1	2	Total
• Nebraska			18
Iowa State			9

- Date: November 1
- Location: State Field, Ames, IA
- Game start: 3:00 p.m.

=== Nebraska Wesleyan ===
Nebraska Wesleyan at Nebraska

Team	1	2	Total
Nebraska Wesleyan			7
• Nebraska			42

- Date: November 8
- Location: Nebraska Field, Lincoln, NE
- Game start: 3:00 p.m.

=== At Kansas ===
Nebraska at Kansas

Team	1	2	Total
• Nebraska			9
Kansas			0

- Date: November 15
- Location: Central Park, Lawrence, KS
- Game start: 2:45 p.m.

=== Iowa ===
Iowa at Nebraska

Team	1	2	3	4	Total
Iowa	0	0	0	0	0
• Nebraska	6	0	0	6	12

- Date: November 22
- Location: Nebraska Field, Lincoln, NE
- Game start: 3:00 p.m.

== Awards ==
Award	Player(s)
All-Western 1st team	Vic Halligan
All-Western 2nd team	Richard Rutherford
All-Western honorable mention	Leonard Purdy
All-Missouri 1st team	Charles Beck, Vic Halligan, Guy Mastin, Leonard Purdy, Richard Rutherford, Max Towle
