= Ray Keeler =

American football player and coach (1891–1945)

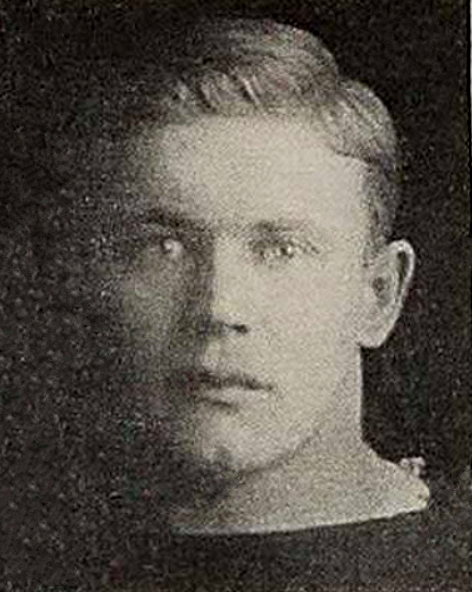
- Keeler from Wisconsin's 1914 yearbook

Biographical details
- Born: April 24, 1891; Bagley, Wisconsin, U.S.
- Died: November 8, 1945 (aged 54); Eau Claire, Wisconsin, U.S.

Playing career
- 1912–1914: Wisconsin
- Position: Guard

Coaching career (HC unless noted)
- 1917–1929: Wisconsin State Teachers

Head coaching record
- Overall: 43–25–15

Accomplishments and honors

Championships
- 3 WIAC (1917, 1919, 1927)

Awards
- Consensus All-American (1913); Second-team All-American (1914); 2× First-team All-Western (1912, 1913)

Raymond Monroe "Tubby" Keeler (April 24, 1891 – November 8, 1945) was an American football player and coach.

Keeler attended the University of Wisconsin, where he played for the Wisconsin Badgers football team and was selected as a consensus first-team honoree at the guard position on the 1913 College Football All-America Team. He was six feet tall and weighed 185 pounds during the 1913 season. He also competed on the Wisconsin track team in the shot put and hammer throw events.

Keeler later served as the head football coach at the Wisconsin State Teachers College—later renamed the University of Wisconsin–La Crosse—from 1917 to 1929. In 13 years as the head football coach, Keeler's teams won three conference championships and compiled a record of 43 wins, 25 losses, and 15 ties.

Keeler died of a heart attack while visiting Eau Claire, Wisconsin.
