= 1913 Iowa State Cyclones football team =

American college football season

1913 Iowa State Cyclones football
- Conference: Missouri Valley Conference
- Record: 4–4 (2–2 MVC)
- Head coach: Homer C. Hubbard (1st season)
- Captain: Lynn Cowan
- Home stadium: State Field

1913 Missouri Valley Conference football standings
	Conf.					Overall
Team	W		L		T	W		L		T
Missouri +	4	–	0	–	0	7	–	1	–	0
Nebraska +	3	–	0	–	0	8	–	0	–	0
Kansas	3	–	2	–	0	5	–	3	–	0
Iowa State	2	–	2	–	0	4	–	4	–	0
Drake	1	–	3	–	0	4	–	3	–	1
Kansas State	0	–	2	–	0	3	–	4	–	1
Washington University	0	–	4	–	0	1	–	5	–	0
+ – Conference co-champions

The 1913 Iowa State Cyclones football team represented Iowa State College of Agricultural and Mechanic Arts (later renamed Iowa State University) in the Missouri Valley Conference during the 1913 college football season. In their second and final season under head coach Homer C. Hubbard, the Cyclones compiled a 4–4 record (2–2 against conference opponents), finished in fourth place in the conference, and were outscored by opponents by a combined total of 119 to 112. Lynn Cowan was the team captain.

Between 1892 and 1913, the football team played on a field that later became the site of the university's Parks Library. The field was known as State Field; when the new field opened in 1915, it became known as "New State Field".

== Schedule ==
Date	Time	Opponent	Site	Result	Attendance	Source
September 27		at Grinnell*	Grinnell, IA	W 6–0		
October 4		at Minnesota*	Northrop Field; Minneapolis, MN	L 0–25	3,000	
October 18	3:00 p.m.	at Washington University*	Francis Field; St. Louis, MO	W 37–7	3,000	
October 25		Missouri	State Field; Ames, IA (rivalry)	L 13–21		
November 1		Nebraska^{†}	State Field; Ames, IA (rivalry)	L 9–18		
November 8		Cornell (IA)*	State Field; Ames, IA	W 14–0		
November 15		at Iowa*	Iowa Field; Iowa City, IA (rivalry)	L 7–45		
November 22		at Drake	Drake Stadium; Des Moines, IA	W 26–3		
*Non-conference game; ^{†}Homecoming; All times are in Central time
