= Ernest Allmendinger =

American football player and coach (1890–1973)

Ernest J. Allmendinger
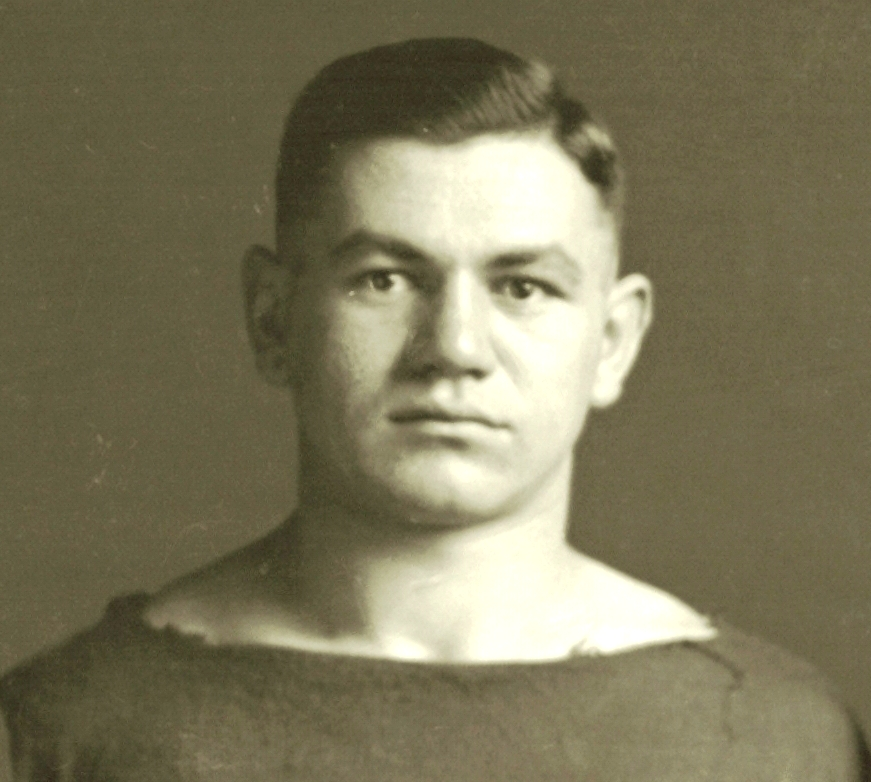
- Ernest Allmendinger cropped from 1912 Michigan football team photograph

Profile
- Position: Guard

Personal information
- Born: August 25, 1890; Ann Arbor, Michigan, U.S.
- Died: May 7, 1973 (aged 82); Ann Arbor, Michigan, U.S.

Career information
- College: Michigan (1911–1913)

Awards and highlights
- First-team All-Service (1917); First-team All-Western (1913)

Ernest John "Aqua" Allmendinger (August 25, 1890 – May 7, 1973) was an American football player and coach. He played college football as a guard for the University of Michigan Wolverines from 1911 to 1913. He was also selected to Walter Camp's All-Service team while serving in the military during World War I.

== Early life ==
Allmendinger was born Ann Arbor, Michigan, in 1890. He was the son of Henry and Wilhelmina "Minnie" Kraus Allmendinger. He grew up in the days of Fielding H. Yost's "Point-a-Minute" teams and played football with John Maulbetsch at Ann Arbor's West Park. He then played right guard and right tackle at Ann Arbor High School from 1907 to 1909 for teams that lost one game in three seasons. He acquired the nickname "Aqua" after working as a waterboy when the Ann Arbor Railroad was raising tracks in 1903 on the streets of Ann Arbor.

== University of Michigan ==
Allmendinger played the guard position at the University of Michigan from 1911 to 1913. In November 1913, Allmendinger helped Michigan to a 17–0 win over Cornell, leading The Washington Post to report: "Allmendinger played a brilliant game on the defense. Three hundred Michigan rooters, headed by their brass band, paraded and snake-danced after the game." At the end of the 1913 season, Allmendinger was picked as an All-Western guard on nearly all of the All-Western teams, including the team selected by Walter Eckersall. A newspaper account in the summer of 1917 described Allmendinger's progression as follows:

"Allmendinger, a young giant in perfect physical condition tried unsuccessfully for two years to make the varsity eleven. His quiet temperament was the handicap and during these years Coach Yost declared that if Allmendinger 'could get good and mad once, he would be one of the greatest linemen in the game.' The third season Yost became desperate. He used third degree methods, and finally the giant awoke, Allmendinger became a demon on the gridiron, nearly every western critic put him on their all-star elevens and some experts thought he should have made the All-American."

Allmendinger received a bachelor of science degree in forestry from Michigan.

== Coaching career ==
Following his playing career, he was the head coach at the South Dakota School of Mines in 1914. He compiled a 4–1 record during his sole season at South Dakota Mines. In 1915, he returned to Michigan as an assistant coach. He was also an assistant at the Colorado School of Mines.

== World War I and Walter Camp's All-Service team ==
In July 1917, as the United States entered World War I, Allmendinger enrolled in the U.S. Army, I Company, 31st Michigan Infantry, becoming "another University of Michigan athlete to answer his country's call." Allmendinger was one of several prominent football players commissioned at Fort Sheridan in the fall of 1917; others included former Michigan All-Americans Albert Benbrook and James B. Craig. On Thanksgiving Day 1917, with the country's top players in the military, an All-Star game between the country's top Army and Navy players was held at Stagg Field in Chicago. Allmendinger was the starting right tackle on the Army team. Because of the war, Walter Camp did not select an All-America team in 1917. Instead, Camp named an All-America service team in 1917, recognizing the country's top football players serving in the military. Allmendinger was named to Camp's 1917 All-Service team. Allmendinger rose to the rank of captain before being discharged in 1919. He also worked as an assistant football coach at Michigan during the 1919 season.

== Family and later years ==
Allmendinger worked as an engineer for the Washtenaw County Road Commission from approximately 1921 to 1954. He then worked for five years for the Huron-Clinton Metropolitan Authority. He also served as an Ann Arbor city councilman in 1927 and 1929 and as a member of the Washtenaw County Board of Supervisors after retiring.

Allmendinger married Marie V. Donohue (1892-1987) in March 1921. They had two daughters, Marian and Doris. Allmendinger and his family lived in Ann Arbor.

In 1969, Allmendinger was chosen in fan balloting as one of five lineman (along with Germany Schulz, Chuck Bernard, Whitey Wistert, and Julius Franks) on the all-time Michigan football team.

He died in 1973 at age 82.

== See also ==
- List of Michigan Wolverines football All-Americans
