= 1913 Minnesota Golden Gophers football team =

American college football season

1913 Minnesota Golden Gophers football
- Conference: Western Conference
- Record: 5–2 (2–1 Western)
- Head coach: Henry L. Williams (14th season)
- Captain: Donald R. Aldworth
- Home stadium: Northrop Field

1913 Western Conference football standings
	Conf.					Overall
Team	W		L		T	W		L		T
Chicago $	7	–	0	–	0	7	–	0	–	0
Iowa	2	–	1	–	0	5	–	2	–	0
Minnesota	2	–	1	–	0	5	–	2	–	0
Purdue	2	–	1	–	2	4	–	1	–	2
Illinois	2	–	2	–	1	4	–	2	–	1
Wisconsin	1	–	2	–	1	3	–	3	–	1
Ohio State	1	–	2	–	0	4	–	2	–	1
Indiana	2	–	4	–	0	3	–	4	–	0
Northwestern	0	–	6	–	0	1	–	6	–	0
$ – Conference champion

The 1913 Minnesota Golden Gophers football team represented the University of Minnesota in the 1913 college football season. In their 14th year under head coach Henry L. Williams, the Golden Gophers compiled a 5–2 record (2–1 against Western Conference opponents), finished in second place in the conference, and outscored their opponents by a combined total of 116 to 32.

Fullback Clark Shaughnessy and end Lorin Solon were named All-Americans by the Associated Press. Shaughnessy and Solon were also named All-Big Ten.

== Schedule ==
Date	Opponent	Site	Result	Attendance
September 27	South Dakota*	Northrop Field; Minneapolis, MN	W 14–0	7,000
October 4	Iowa State*	Northrop Field; Minneapolis, MN	W 25–0	3,000
October 18	at Nebraska*	Nebraska Field; Lincoln, NE (rivalry)	L 0–7	9,000
October 25	North Dakota*	Northrop Field; Minneapolis, MN	W 30–0	2,500
November 1	at Wisconsin	Randall Field; Madison, WI (rivalry)	W 21–3	11,000
November 15	Chicago	Northrop Field; Minneapolis, MN	L 7–13	21,000
November 22	at Illinois	Illinois Field; Champaign, IL	W 19–9	3,500
*Non-conference game
