= James B. Craig =

American football player (1893–1990)

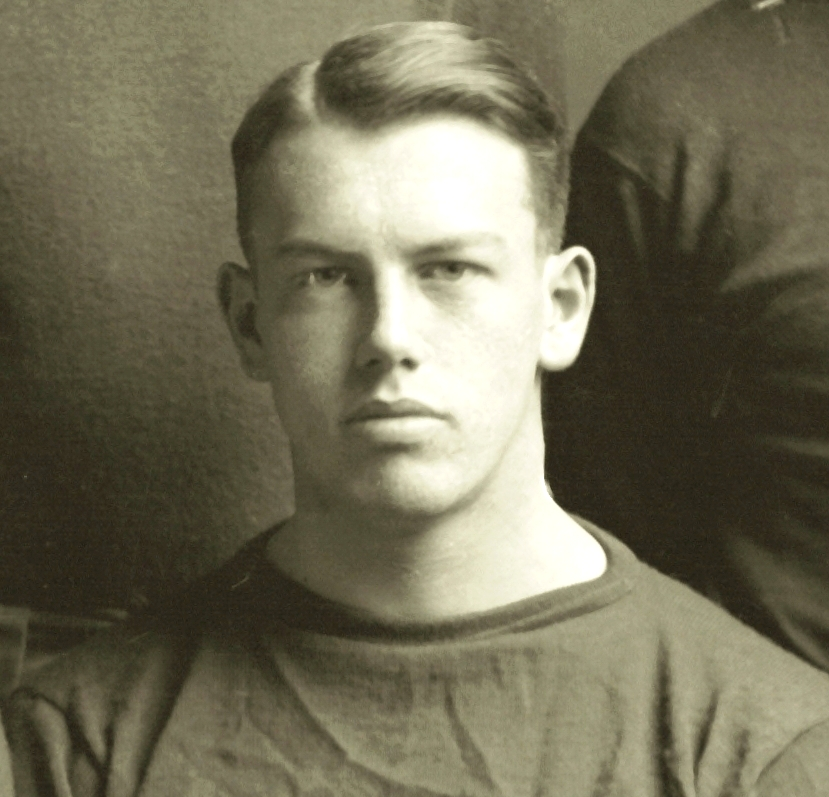

Biographical details
- Born: March 11, 1893; Detroit, Michigan, U.S.
- Died: January 1990 (aged 96)

Playing career
- 1911–1913: Michigan
- Positions: Halfback, quarterback

Coaching career (HC unless noted)
- 1919: Arkansas

Administrative career (AD unless noted)
- 1919–1920: Arkansas

Head coaching record
- Overall: 3–4

Accomplishments and honors

Awards
- Consensus All-American (1913); 2× First-team All-Western (1912, 1913)

James Blodgett Craig (March 11, 1893 – January 1990) was an All-American football halfback and quarterback who played with the University of Michigan Wolverines from 1911 to 1913. He was named an All-American in 1913. He also served as the athletic director and head football coach at the University of Arkansas from 1919 to 1920.

== Early years ==
Craig was born on March 11, 1893, in Detroit, Michigan. He was the son of William Craig, born in 1856, and Alice Craig, born in 1867. At the time of the 1900 U.S. Census, the Craig family was living at 136 Charlotte Avenue in Detroit. The family at that time consisted of William, identified as a capitalist, Alice, and sons Ralph (born 1889), James (born 1893), and William (born 1896).

== The Craig brothers: track champions ==
Before Craig ever played a down for the Wolverines, he established himself as one of the top hurdlers in the country. In a meet against Cornell in March 1911, Craig broke the world indoor record by running the 49-yard (45 m) high hurdles in 5 1–5 seconds. In 1912, Craig won the low hurdles competition in the 1912 Eastern Inter-Collegiate Athletic Association. Craig's older brother, Ralph Craig, was also a track star at the University of Michigan who went on to win the gold medals in the 100 and 200-meter events at the 1912 Olympics in Stockholm, Sweden.

== College football at Michigan ==
=== The 1911 season ===
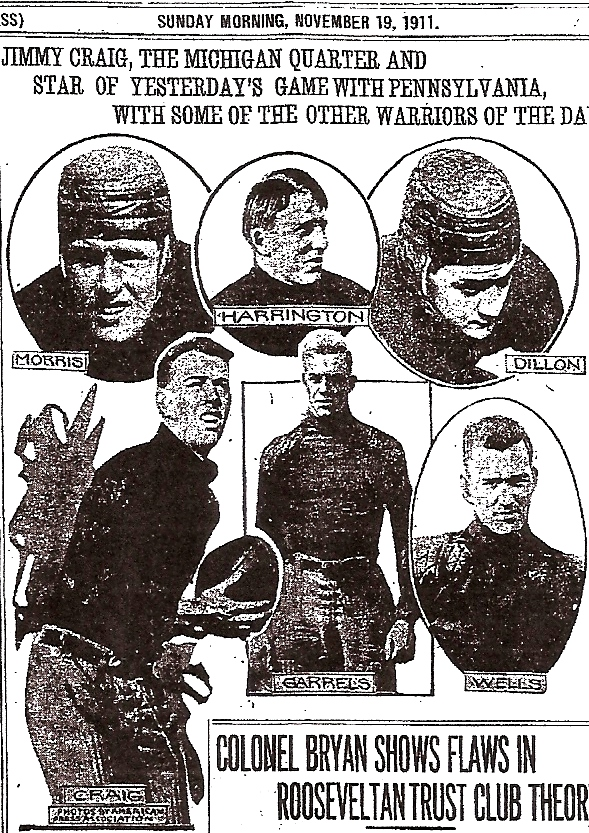
Jimmy Craig, hero of the 1911 Penn. game

Craig debuted with the Michigan Wolverines football team in 1911, playing games at both quarterback and halfback. In October 1911, Coach Fielding H. Yost worked with Craig as a quarterback. Yost reported in early October that he was attaining considerable success with Craig, but he was "far from being a finished performer." Yost noted that Craig was diligent and he "runs the team fast and uses his brains in directing plays."

The Wolverines finished the 1911 season with a 5–1–2 record. They started the season with convincing wins against and Case Institute of Technology, 24–0, Michigan Agricultural College, and Ohio State, 19–0, and narrowly beat Vanderbilt, 9–8. After starting the season 4–0, the Wolverines went 1–1–2 in their final four games, including a loss to Cornell and ties with Syracuse and Nebraska.

In the Syracuse game, Craig suffered an injury to his ribs (believed to be torn cartilage) after being "fiercely tackled" and was expected to be unable to play "for an indefinite period."

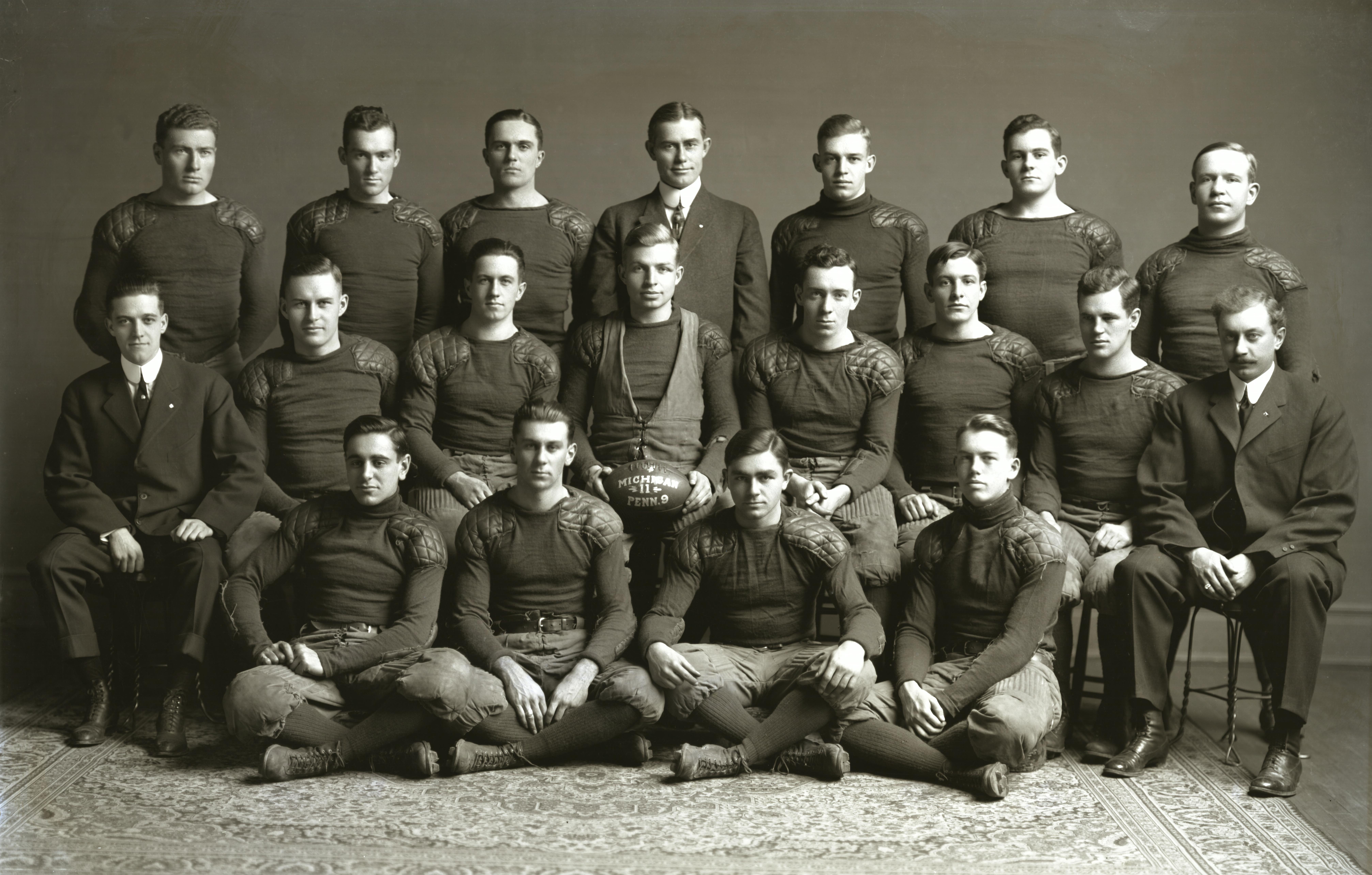
1911 Michigan Wolverines football team

Despite the rib injury, Craig came back to lead the Wolverines to an 11–9 win over Pennsylvania two weeks later. News accounts at the time reported that the "craftiness of Coach Yost and the speed of 'Jimmy' Craig" led Michigan to the win in an icy blizzard at Ferry Field. Late in the game, Craig scored the winning touchdown on a "double pass." In one of Yost's "trick plays," Michigan's "interference started to the right," and the ball was then shot to Craig, waiting far to the left. Craig dodged two tacklers and sprinted 26 yards (24 m) for a touchdown. The New York Times referred to Craig as "Michigan's offensive and defensive hero" in a "clean, snappy, spectacular, thrilling" game.

=== The 1912 season ===
In 1912, the Wolverines again got off to a 3–0 start with convincing wins over Case (34–0), Michigan Agricultural College (55–7), and Ohio State (14–0). After the first three games, the Syracuse Herald noted that "according to all the reports from Ann Arbor, (Craig) is tearing up the opposing lines with ease."

After the strong start, Michigan lost two of three games to Syracuse (18–7) and Pennsylvania (27–21). In the final game of the season, Michigan beat Cornell, 13–7, with the help of "speed merchant" Jimmy Craig.

At the end of the season, Craig won numerous accolades for his strong performance:

- Craig was reputed to be "the best football player 'Hurry Up' Yost has had at Michigan since Willie Heston."
- "If it wasn’t for Jimmie Craig it is doubtful if Yost would know he had a football team this year. The fleet halfback has been Michigan’s only hero."
- Craig was "as game as a terrier ever tossed into a pit."
- "Jimmy climbed off crutches to enter the big games – those with Pennsylvania and Cornell."
- Fielding H. Yost, who was not known to praise his players publicly, said of Craig: "Is Jimmy Craig 'game?' You’ll have to invent a new word, more emphatic than that when you describe him."

=== Craig's "holdout stunt" in 1913 ===
In the summer of 1913, Craig shocked the football world when he announced that he would not play football in 1913. There were varying accounts in the press as to the reason for his decision. In initial comments, Craig said he needed to drop athletics or fall behind in his university courses. A second reason given for the decision was a bad knee. A third reason discussed in the press was that Craig decided not to play because he was not selected as captain of the 1913 team. "Craig has never admitted that that was the reason he was out but it is the generally accepted belief here that it was so. Craig said he was staying out until the Syracuse game due to a bad knee and too much work in the university."

Whatever the reason, Craig's decision was the subject of extensive attention. A wire service report in August 1913 suggested that as long as Craig stuck to his decision to give up football, every conversation would turn to his "holdout stunt." The report also noted: "If the football star needs the time he might devote to football for his studies it is a pity. He will hardly gain all the time he hopes by quitting, for much of it will be taken up by the persistence of the well-wishers of the football team. Moreover, in the end, he is almost certain to give way."

The pressure on Craig intensified when Michigan lost to Michigan Agricultural College for the first time in the school's history. After a 55–7 drubbing in 1912, the Aggies beat Michigan, 12–7, in 1913. Less than a week after the loss, Craig announced he would return. The New York Times reported: "There was joy in the Michigan football camp this afternoon when Jimmy Craig, star halfback on the 1911 and 1912 Michigan football eleven, appeared in uniform and joined his teammates in practice...Michigan's defeat by M.A.C. last Saturday and urgent pleading by the entire student body, however, induced him to re-enter the game today."

=== Craig's All-American performance in 1913 ===
Craig's first game back in the lineup was a 43–8 win against Syracuse. Craig scored a touchdown soon after the game started and added three more in the second period. "Jimmy Craig, playing his first game of the season, was the mighty power behind Michigan’s offense. Time after time, for two periods, he dashed around the ends or battered between the tackles." The New York Times and The Washington Post referred to Michigan as "a savage offense, the product of a desperate eleven," and noted that the Syracuse line "melted against a whirlwind attack."

In the final two games, Craig and the Wolverines had convincing wins against Cornell (17–0) and Pennsylvania (13–0) to finish the year 6–1.

Yost referred to the 1913 football team as "the best I ever coached." At a "smoker" in the team's honor, Coach Yost presented Craig with the prized Heston-Schulz Cup given to the team's most valuable player as selected by Yost, Germany Schulz, and the team trainer.

Craig was also chosen by Walter Camp as an All-American in 1913. While Harvard's Charles Brickley was chosen for other All-American teams, Yost publicly proclaimed Craig as the best all-around back in the country. Yost said: "Craig hits his man as hard as any player in the country and is one of the surest tacklers I have ever seen. When he hits a runner around the knees he throws him with such a jar that it usually takes all the spice out of him for the rest of the afternoon. Craig, although he weighs 160 pounds, is also a better blocker than Brickley. In intercepting forward passes I have never seen his equal, and what he can do in shooting through quick openings in the line and circling ends need not be dwelt upon. As far as scoring points goes, Brickley's toe makes him more valuable, but otherwise, I wouldn't trade Craig for Brickley or any other back in the country. Craig played wonderful football this year and was far better than last season or 1911."

In 1929, former Michigan head coach and then University of Wisconsin–Madison athletic director, George Little spoke of Craig as an example of a team player. Little told how, at the end of the 1913 football season, after Craig had been named by Walter Camp as an All-American, Craig went to the room of one of his teammates and thanked this player for helping him make the All-American team. Craig said: "I couldn’t have carried the ball if you hadn’t done the blocking." Little said Craig "had the ability, was clean in body, possessed an appreciation of the work of others and was not cocky. When you find one man with all these qualities, you may be sure he has everything necessary for success."

Even 20 years after his graduation, Craig was "often mentioned as the last great running back at Ann Arbor."

== Later life ==
Though not on the varsity football coaching staff, Craig was a coach at Michigan in 1914, and in 1915 he coached at Mercersburg Academy an independent, boarding school in Pennsylvania.

=== Yacht racing ===
In 1916, Craig was appointed fleet captain of the Detroit Boat Club. Craig was described as an "ardent skipper" who won several races in the "catboat" class.

=== Service in World War I ===
In March 1917, Craig was hired to succeed T. T. McConnell as the athletic director of the University of Arkansas. However, on account of Craig's desire to go into the Army during World War I, the university released him from the contract. Craig served for two years as a first lieutenant in the 315th F.A., 80th Division, of the American Expeditionary Force, including 13 months of service in Europe.

Around Thanksgiving in 1917, seven games were played between inter-service, inter-camp and Western Conference teams. The proceeds were donated to soldier funds. Craig played for the Fort Sheridan team which also included former Michigan stars Albert Benbrook and Ernest Allmendinger. The Fort Sheridan team played the Great Lakes team on Thanksgiving Day on Stagg Field in Chicago.

=== University of Arkansas athletic director ===
Craig returned from France in August 1919 and was promptly re-hired by the University of Arkansas as director of athletics and coach of the football and baseball teams. The football team was 3–4 in Craig's first season as head coach – the first losing season since 1914. Craig served only one year at Arkansas, announcing his resignation in March 1920, effective at the end of the college year.

=== Later years ===
At the time of the 1930 Census, James B. Craig and his wife Ruth J. Craig were living in Scio Township, Michigan, west of Ann Arbor. The couple had two children, John (age 9) and Mary (age 7). Craig listed his occupation as farmer.

== Head coaching record ==
Year	Team	Overall	Conference	Standing	Bowl/playoffs
Arkansas Razorbacks (Southwest Conference) (1919)
1919	Arkansas	3–4	1–2	5th	
Arkansas:		3–4	1–2		
Total:		3–4			

== See also ==
- List of Michigan Wolverines football All-Americans
