= 1913 Wisconsin Badgers football team =

American college football season

1913 Wisconsin Badgers football
- Conference: Western Conference
- Record: 3–3–1 (1–2–1 Western)
- Head coach: William Juneau (2nd season)
- Captain: Alvin Tandberg
- Home stadium: Randall Field

1913 Western Conference football standings
	Conf.					Overall
Team	W		L		T	W		L		T
Chicago $	7	–	0	–	0	7	–	0	–	0
Iowa	2	–	1	–	0	5	–	2	–	0
Minnesota	2	–	1	–	0	5	–	2	–	0
Purdue	2	–	1	–	2	4	–	1	–	2
Illinois	2	–	2	–	1	4	–	2	–	1
Wisconsin	1	–	2	–	1	3	–	3	–	1
Ohio State	1	–	2	–	0	4	–	2	–	1
Indiana	2	–	4	–	0	3	–	4	–	0
Northwestern	0	–	6	–	0	1	–	6	–	0
$ – Conference champion

The 1913 Wisconsin Badgers football team represented the University of Wisconsin as a member of the Western Conference during the 1913 college football season. Led second-year head coach William Juneau, the Badgers compiled an overall record of 3–3–1 with a mark of 1–2–1 in conference play, placing sixth in the Western Conference. The team's captain was Alvin Tandberg.

== Schedule ==
Date	Opponent	Site	Result	Attendance	Source
October 4	Lawrence*	Randall Field; Madison, WI	W 58–7		
October 11	Marquette*	Randall Field; Madison, WI	W 13–0		
October 18	at Purdue	Stuart Field; West Lafayette, IN	T 7–7		
October 25	Michigan Agricultural*	Randall Field; Madison, WI	L 7–12		
November 1	Minnesota^{†}	Randall Field; Madison, WI (rivalry)	L 3–21	11,000	
November 8	Ohio State	Randall Field; Madison, WI	W 12–0		
November 22	at Chicago	Stagg Field; Chicago, IL	L 0–19		
*Non-conference game; ^{†}Homecoming
