= William McAlmon =

American football player and coach (1889–1917)

Biographical details
- Born: June 19, 1889; Dell Rapids, South Dakota, U.S.
- Died: January 4, 1917 (aged 27); Minneapolis, Minnesota, U.S.

Playing career
- 1911–1913: Minnesota
- Position: Halfback

Coaching career (HC unless noted)
- 1915–1916: Grinnell

Head coaching record
- Overall: 13–2

Accomplishments and honors

Awards
- All-Western (1913)

William A. McAlmon (June 19, 1889 – January 4, 1917) was an American football player and coach. He played college football as a halfback at the University of Minnesota from 1911 to 1913. McAlmon Served as the head football coach at Grinnell College from 1915 to 1916, compiling a record of 13–2. McAlmon died on January 4, 1917, in Minneapolis, Minnesota, after suffering from diabetes.

== Head coaching record ==
Year	Team	Overall	Conference	Standing	Bowl/playoffs
Grinnell Pioneers (Independent) (1915–1916)
1915	Grinnell	6–1			
1916	Grinnell	7–1			
Grinnell:		13–2			
Total:		13–2			
