= Illinois–Missouri football rivalry =

American college football rivalry

Arch Rivalry

- Illinois Fighting Illini Missouri Tigers
- First meeting: October 17, 1896; Illinois, 10–0
- Latest meeting: September 4, 2010; Missouri, 23–13
- Next meeting: 2029

Statistics
- Total meetings: 24
- All-time series: Missouri leads, 17–7
- Largest victory: Missouri, 52–7 (1969)
- Longest win streak: Missouri, 6 (2002–present)
- Current win streak: Missouri, 6 (2002–present)

Locations of Illinois and Missouri

The Illinois–Missouri football rivalry, also known as the Arch Rivalry, is an American college football rivalry between the Illinois Fighting Illini football team of the University of Illinois and Missouri Tigers football team of the University of Missouri. Both schools consider it a friendlier, secondary rivalry compared to their other rivalries like the Border War and Northwestern, but it still generates interest from students and alumni, especially those in and around Greater St. Louis. Both schools have considerable alumni from the area.

Although match-ups generally have not taken place annually, in recent years, the series has been played more frequently. It was the opening game of the season for both teams, for the 2007 through 2010 seasons. After the 2010 season, the series has ceased through 2029, when the two schools will renew the game. On November 6, 2011, Missouri accepted an invitation to join the SEC in 2012. As a result, any future meetings between the two schools will be labeled as a Big Ten vs. SEC matchup.

The schools first met in 1896, and played sporadically until 1966. They played six straight seasons from 1975–80, helping to start a series in men's basketball. That series has been played in all but one year since 1980, and is known as Braggin' Rights. Unlike the Arch Rivalry, the annual Braggin' Rights game is still an active tradition.

In 2017, both schools announced a renewing of the series to start in 2026. The series will be played on the campuses of the two schools. The renewal of the series was later postponed to 2029.

== Venue ==
The series started in St. Louis, Missouri, in 1896. For the majority of the history of the series, it had traded off between Memorial Stadium in Champaign, Illinois, and Faurot Field in Columbia, Missouri. In 2002, the games returned to St. Louis where they played at The Dome at America's Center. Missouri has claimed victory at every game since the series returned to St. Louis. Missouri leads 5–1 when played in Columbia. The series is tied 5–5 for games played in Champaign.

== Game results ==
Illinois victories	Missouri victories

No.	Date	Location	Winner	Score
1	October 17, 1896	St. Louis, MO	Illinois	10–0
2	October 11, 1913	Champaign, IL	Illinois	24–7
3	October 15, 1949	Champaign, IL	Missouri	27–20
4	September 24, 1966	Champaign, IL	Missouri	21–14
5	September 28, 1968	Champaign, IL	Missouri	44–0
6	September 27, 1969	Saint Louis, MO	No. 11 Missouri	37–6
7	September 20, 1975	Champaign, IL	No. 5 Missouri	30–20
8	September 18, 1976	Columbia, MO	Illinois	31–6
9	September 17, 1977	Champaign, IL	Illinois	11–7
10	October 7, 1978	Columbia, MO	Missouri	45–3
11	September 15, 1979	Champaign, IL	No. 11 Missouri	14–6
12	September 15, 1980	Columbia, MO	No. 15 Missouri	52–7
13	September 10, 1983	Columbia, MO	Missouri	28–18

No.	Date	Location	Winner	Score
14	September 8, 1984	Champaign, IL	Illinois	30–24
15	September 14, 1991	Columbia, MO	Missouri	23–19
16	September 12, 1992	Champaign, IL	Illinois	24–17
17	September 11, 1993	Columbia, MO	Missouri	31–3
18	September 10, 1994	Champaign, IL	Illinois	42–0
19	August 31, 2002	Saint Louis, MO	Missouri	33–20
20	August 30, 2003	Saint Louis, MO	Missouri	22–15
21	September 1, 2007	Saint Louis, MO	Missouri	40–34
22	August 30, 2008	Saint Louis, MO	No. 6 Missouri	52–42
23	September 5, 2009	Saint Louis, MO	Missouri	37–9
24	September 4, 2010	Saint Louis, MO	Missouri	23–13
Series: Missouri leads 17–7

== See also ==
- List of NCAA college football rivalry games
- Braggin' Rights – the men's basketball equivalent
