= Kansas City University (1896–1933) =

Coordinates: 39.127434°N 94.669062°W

This is an article about the defunct university in Kansas. For the university sometimes previously known by the same name located across the state line in Missouri, see University of Missouri–Kansas City. For the health sciences university in Kansas City, Missouri, see Kansas City University of Medicine and Biosciences

Kansas City University was a private Methodist university in Kansas City, Kansas, United States. Founded in 1896, it ceased operations in 1933. It was the successor-in-interest to Campbell College in Holton (which in turn had been the successor-in-interest to Lane University in Lecompton). In 1906, newspapers noted that the college president D. S. Stephens spoke in favor of a controversial merger between the United Brethren and Methodist church conferences.

The university was based out of Mather Hall, a large brick and mortar building that held the school's library, administrative offices, and numerous classrooms. Today, the building is still standing and is owned by the Central States Conference of the Seventh-day Adventist Church, who use the building as a conference and retreat center.

== Athletics ==
By the time of the school's existence, Kansas City U. athletic teams were called the Cowboys. The Cowboys competed in the Kansas Collegiate Athletic Conference (KCAC) from 1902–03 to 1922–23.
