= Northwestern Field =

Defunct American football stadium in Evanston, Illinois (1905–1925)

Coordinates: 42°03′55″N 87°41′36″W

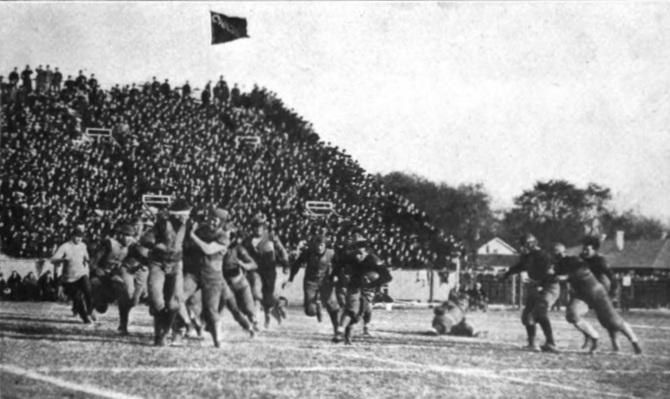
- Interactive map of Northwestern Field
- Location: Evanston, Illinois
- Owner: Northwestern University
- Capacity: 10,000
- Surface: Turf

Construction
- Groundbreaking: 1904
- Opened: 1905
- Closed: 1925
- Demolished: 1925

Tenant
- Northwestern Wildcats (football) (1905–1925)

Northwestern Field was a football stadium in Evanston, Illinois. It opened in 1905 and was home to the Northwestern Wildcats football team prior to the Dyche Stadium (now known as Ryan Field) opening in 1926. It had a capacity of 10,000 people. Northwestern Field was located on Central Ave, seventy-five feet east of the current stadium.

After significant victories during the 1903 season drew large crowds, Northwestern business manager and former Evanston mayor William Dyche lobbied the school for a new stadium, arguing that 1,000-seat Sheppard Field could no longer meet popular demand. A 12-acre (49,000 m^{2}) lot northwest of campus was chosen for the project, with construction beginning in 1904 and ending in 1905.
