= List of Big Eight Conference football standings =

This is a list of yearly Big Eight Conference football standings.

== Big Eight standings ==
=== Missouri Valley Conference standings ===
1907 Missouri Valley Conference football standings
	Conf.					Overall
Team	W		L		T	W		L		T
Iowa +	1	–	0	–	0	3	–	2	–	0
Nebraska +	1	–	0	–	0	8	–	2	–	0
Kansas	1	–	1	–	0	5	–	3	–	0
Missouri	1	–	2	–	0	7	–	2	–	0
Washington University	0	–	1	–	0	1	–	5	–	1
+ – Conference co-champions

1908 Missouri Valley Conference football standings
	Conf.					Overall
Team	W		L		T	W		L		T
Kansas $	4	–	0	–	0	9	–	0	–	0
Nebraska	2	–	1	–	0	7	–	2	–	1
Iowa State	2	–	1	–	0	6	–	3	–	0
Missouri	3	–	2	–	0	6	–	2	–	0
Drake	1	–	2	–	0	5	–	2	–	0
Washington University	0	–	2	–	0	4	–	4	–	1
Iowa	0	–	4	–	0	2	–	5	–	0
$ – Conference champion

1909 Missouri Valley Conference football standings
	Conf.					Overall
Team	W		L		T	W		L		T
Missouri $	4	–	0	–	1	7	–	0	–	1
Kansas	3	–	1	–	0	8	–	1	–	0
Drake	2	–	1	–	0	6	–	1	–	0
Iowa	1	–	3	–	1	2	–	4	–	1
Iowa State	0	–	2	–	1	4	–	3	–	1
Nebraska	0	–	1	–	0	3	–	3	–	2
Washington University	0	–	2	–	0	3	–	4	–	0
$ – Conference champion

1910 Missouri Valley Conference football standings
	Conf.					Overall
Team	W		L		T	W		L		T
Nebraska $	2	–	0	–	0	7	–	1	–	0
Iowa	3	–	1	–	0	5	–	2	–	0
Missouri	2	–	1	–	1	4	–	2	–	2
Iowa State	2	–	2	–	0	4	–	4	–	0
Kansas	1	–	1	–	1	6	–	1	–	1
Washington University	0	–	2	–	0	3	–	4	–	0
Drake	0	–	3	–	0	3	–	5	–	0
$ – Conference champion

1911 Missouri Valley Conference football standings
	Conf.					Overall
Team	W		L		T	W		L		T
Iowa State +	2	–	0	–	1	6	–	1	–	1
Nebraska +	2	–	0	–	1	5	–	1	–	2
Kansas	1	–	1	–	1	4	–	2	–	2
Washington University	0	–	0	–	2	4	–	2	–	2
Missouri	0	–	2	–	2	2	–	4	–	2
Drake	0	–	2	–	1	5	–	2	–	1
+ – Conference co-champions

1912 Missouri Valley Conference football standings
	Conf.					Overall
Team	W		L		T	W		L		T
Nebraska +	2	–	0	–	0	8	–	1	–	0
Iowa State +	2	–	0	–	0	6	–	2	–	0
Drake	2	–	2	–	0	5	–	3	–	0
Missouri	2	–	3	–	0	5	–	3	–	0
Kansas	1	–	2	–	0	4	–	4	–	0
Washington University	0	–	2	–	0	4	–	4	–	0
+ – Conference co-champions

1913 Missouri Valley Conference football standings
	Conf.					Overall
Team	W		L		T	W		L		T
Missouri +	4	–	0	–	0	7	–	1	–	0
Nebraska +	3	–	0	–	0	8	–	0	–	0
Kansas	3	–	2	–	0	5	–	3	–	0
Iowa State	2	–	2	–	0	4	–	4	–	0
Drake	1	–	3	–	0	4	–	3	–	1
Kansas State	0	–	2	–	0	3	–	4	–	1
Washington University	0	–	4	–	0	1	–	5	–	0
+ – Conference co-champions

1914 Missouri Valley Conference football standings
	Conf.					Overall
Team	W		L		T	W		L		T
Nebraska $	3	–	0	–	0	7	–	0	–	1
Missouri	4	–	1	–	0	5	–	3	–	0
Iowa State	2	–	1	–	0	4	–	3	–	0
Kansas	2	–	2	–	0	5	–	2	–	1
Washington University	0	–	1	–	1	3	–	3	–	1
Drake	0	–	3	–	1	4	–	3	–	1
Kansas State	0	–	3	–	0	1	–	5	–	1
$ – Conference champion

1915 Missouri Valley Conference football standings
	Conf.					Overall
Team	W		L		T	W		L		T
Nebraska $	4	–	0	–	0	8	–	0	–	0
Kansas	3	–	1	–	0	6	–	2	–	0
Iowa State	2	–	1	–	0	6	–	2	–	0
Washington University	1	–	1	–	0	3	–	2	–	0
Missouri	1	–	3	–	1	2	–	5	–	1
Drake	1	–	4	–	0	2	–	6	–	0
Kansas State	0	–	2	–	1	3	–	4	–	1
$ – Conference champion

1916 Missouri Valley Conference football standings
	Conf.					Overall
Team	W		L		T	W		L		T
Nebraska $	3	–	1	–	0	6	–	2	–	0
Missouri	3	–	1	–	1	6	–	1	–	1
Iowa State	2	–	1	–	1	5	–	2	–	1
Kansas State	1	–	1	–	1	6	–	1	–	1
Kansas	1	–	2	–	1	4	–	3	–	1
Drake	1	–	3	–	0	3	–	5	–	0
Washington University	0	–	2	–	0	3	–	3	–	1
$ – Conference champion

1917 Missouri Valley Conference football standings
	Conf.					Overall
Team	W		L		T	W		L		T
Nebraska $	2	–	0	–	0	5	–	2	–	0
Kansas	3	–	1	–	0	6	–	2	–	0
Iowa State	3	–	1	–	0	5	–	2	–	0
Kansas State	2	–	2	–	0	6	–	2	–	0
Missouri	2	–	4	–	0	3	–	5	–	0
Washington University	1	–	2	–	0	4	–	3	–	0
Drake	0	–	3	–	0	0	–	5	–	2
$ – Conference champion

1918 Missouri Valley Conference football standings
Drake	–	3	–	2	–	0
Iowa State	–	0	–	3	–	0
Kansas	–	2	–	2	–	0
Kansas State	–	4	–	1	–	0
Missouri	–	0	–	0	–	0
Nebraska	–	2	–	3	–	1
Washington University	–	6	–	0	–	0
Due to events related to World War I and the 1918 flu pandemic, the Missouri Valley Intercollegiate Athletic Association did not schedule any official conference games, recorded no standings, and awarded no title for 1918. Additionally, Missouri canceled their season.

1919 Missouri Valley Conference football standings
	Conf.					Overall
Team	W		L		T	W		L		T
Missouri $	4	–	0	–	1	5	–	1	–	2
Iowa State	3	–	1	–	1	5	–	2	–	1
Washington University	2	–	2	–	0	5	–	2	–	0
Drake	2	–	2	–	0	4	–	3	–	0
Kansas	1	–	1	–	1	3	–	2	–	3
Kansas State	0	–	3	–	1	3	–	5	–	1
Grinnell	0	–	3	–	0	1	–	4	–	1
$ – Conference champion

1920 Missouri Valley Conference football standings
	Conf.					Overall
Team	W		L		T	W		L		T
Oklahoma $	4	–	0	–	1	6	–	0	–	1
Missouri	5	–	1	–	0	7	–	1	–	0
Kansas	3	–	2	–	0	5	–	2	–	1
Iowa State	3	–	2	–	0	4	–	4	–	0
Drake	1	–	3	–	1	4	–	5	–	1
Washington University	1	–	4	–	0	4	–	4	–	0
Grinnell	0	–	2	–	1	3	–	3	–	1
Kansas State	0	–	3	–	1	3	–	3	–	3
$ – Conference champion

1921 Missouri Valley Conference football standings
	Conf.					Overall
Team	W		L		T	W		L		T
Nebraska $	3	–	0	–	0	7	–	1	–	0
Kansas State	4	–	2	–	0	5	–	3	–	0
Missouri	4	–	2	–	0	6	–	2	–	0
Drake	2	–	2	–	0	5	–	2	–	0
Kansas	3	–	3	–	0	4	–	4	–	0
Iowa State	3	–	4	–	0	4	–	4	–	0
Oklahoma	2	–	3	–	0	5	–	3	–	0
Washington University	2	–	3	–	0	4	–	3	–	1
Grinnell	0	–	4	–	0	2	–	5	–	0
$ – Conference champion

1922 Missouri Valley Conference football standings
	Conf.					Overall
Team	W		L		T	W		L		T
Nebraska +	5	–	0	–	0	7	–	1	–	0
Drake +	4	–	0	–	0	7	–	0	–	0
Kansas State	3	–	1	–	2	5	–	1	–	2
Missouri	4	–	3	–	0	5	–	3	–	0
Iowa State	2	–	4	–	0	2	–	6	–	0
Oklahoma	1	–	2	–	2	2	–	3	–	3
Grinnell	1	–	3	–	0	3	–	4	–	1
Kansas	1	–	3	–	1	3	–	3	–	1
Washington University	0	–	5	–	1	1	–	5	–	1
+ – Conference co-champions

1923 Missouri Valley Conference football standings
	Conf.					Overall
Team	W		L		T	W		L		T
Kansas +	3	–	0	–	3	5	–	0	–	3
Nebraska +	3	–	0	–	2	4	–	2	–	2
Drake	3	–	1	–	0	5	–	2	–	0
Iowa State	3	–	2	–	1	4	–	3	–	1
Kansas State	2	–	2	–	2	4	–	2	–	2
Oklahoma	2	–	4	–	0	3	–	5	–	0
Missouri	1	–	3	–	2	2	–	3	–	3
Grinnell	1	–	3	–	0	2	–	6	–	0
Washington University	1	–	4	–	0	3	–	5	–	0
+ – Conference co-champions

1924 Missouri Valley Conference football standings
	Conf.					Overall
Team	W		L		T	W		L		T
No. 10 Missouri $	5	–	1	–	0	7	–	2	–	0
Nebraska	3	–	1	–	0	5	–	3	–	0
Drake	3	–	1	–	1	5	–	2	–	1
Grinnell	2	–	1	–	0	3	–	3	–	0
Iowa State	3	–	2	–	0	4	–	3	–	1
Oklahoma	2	–	3	–	1	2	–	5	–	1
Kansas	2	–	4	–	1	2	–	5	–	1
Kansas State	1	–	4	–	1	3	–	4	–	1
Washington University	0	–	4	–	0	4	–	4	–	0
$ – Conference champion; Rankings from Dickinson System

1925 Missouri Valley Conference football standings
	Conf.					Overall
Team	W		L		T	W		L		T
No. 5 Missouri $	5	–	1	–	0	6	–	1	–	1
Drake	5	–	2	–	0	5	–	3	–	0
Kansas State	3	–	2	–	1	5	–	2	–	1
Iowa State	3	–	2	–	1	4	–	3	–	1
Nebraska	2	–	2	–	1	4	–	2	–	2
Oklahoma	3	–	3	–	1	4	–	3	–	1
Grinnell	2	–	2	–	1	3	–	3	–	2
Kansas	2	–	5	–	1	2	–	5	–	1
Washington University	1	–	4	–	1	2	–	5	–	1
Oklahoma A&M	0	–	3	–	1	2	–	5	–	1
$ – Conference champion; Rankings from Dickinson System

1926 Missouri Valley Conference football standings
	Conf.					Overall
Team	W		L		T	W		L		T
Oklahoma A&M $	3	–	0	–	1	3	–	4	–	1
Nebraska	5	–	1	–	0	6	–	2	–	0
Missouri	4	–	1	–	0	5	–	1	–	2
Grinnell	3	–	1	–	1	6	–	1	–	1
Oklahoma	3	–	2	–	1	5	–	2	–	1
Kansas State	2	–	2	–	0	5	–	3	–	0
Iowa State	3	–	3	–	1	4	–	3	–	1
Drake	1	–	4	–	0	2	–	6	–	0
Kansas	1	–	5	–	0	2	–	6	–	0
Washington University	0	–	6	–	0	1	–	7	–	0
$ – Conference champion

1927 Missouri Valley Conference football standings
	Conf.					Overall
Team	W		L		T	W		L		T
Missouri $	5	–	1	–	0	7	–	2	–	0
No. 9 Nebraska	4	–	1	–	0	6	–	2	–	0
Oklahoma A&M	2	–	1	–	0	4	–	4	–	0
Iowa State	3	–	2	–	0	4	–	3	–	1
Washington University	2	–	2	–	1	5	–	2	–	2
Kansas	3	–	3	–	1	3	–	4	–	1
Oklahoma	2	–	3	–	0	3	–	3	–	2
Kansas State	2	–	4	–	0	3	–	5	–	0
Drake	1	–	2	–	0	3	–	6	–	0
Grinnell	0	–	5	–	0	0	–	7	–	1
$ – Conference champion; Rankings from Dickinson System

=== Big Six Conference standings ===
1928 Big Six Conference football standings
	Conf.					Overall
Team	W		L		T	W		L		T
Nebraska $	5	–	0	–	0	7	–	1	–	1
Oklahoma	3	–	2	–	0	5	–	3	–	0
Missouri	3	–	2	–	0	4	–	4	–	0
Iowa State	2	–	2	–	1	2	–	5	–	1
Kansas	1	–	3	–	1	2	–	4	–	2
Kansas State	0	–	5	–	0	3	–	5	–	0
$ – Conference champion

1929 Big Six Conference football standings
	Conf.					Overall
Team	W		L		T	W		L		T
No. 7 Nebraska $	3	–	0	–	2	4	–	1	–	3
Missouri	3	–	1	–	1	5	–	2	–	1
Kansas State	3	–	2	–	0	3	–	5	–	0
Oklahoma	2	–	2	–	1	3	–	3	–	2
Kansas	2	–	3	–	0	4	–	4	–	0
Iowa State	0	–	5	–	0	1	–	7	–	0
$ – Conference champion; Rankings from Dickinson System

1930 Big Six Conference football standings
	Conf.					Overall
Team	W		L		T	W		L		T
Kansas $	4	–	1	–	0	6	–	2	–	0
Oklahoma	3	–	1	–	1	4	–	3	–	1
Kansas State	3	–	2	–	0	5	–	3	–	0
Nebraska	2	–	2	–	1	4	–	3	–	2
Missouri	1	–	2	–	2	2	–	5	–	2
Iowa State	0	–	5	–	0	0	–	9	–	0
$ – Conference champion

1931 Big Six Conference football standings
	Conf.					Overall
Team	W		L		T	W		L		T
Nebraska $	5	–	0	–	0	8	–	2	–	0
Iowa State	3	–	1	–	0	5	–	3	–	0
Kansas State	3	–	2	–	0	8	–	2	–	0
Kansas	1	–	3	–	0	5	–	5	–	0
Missouri	1	–	4	–	0	2	–	8	–	0
Oklahoma	1	–	4	–	0	4	–	7	–	1
$ – Conference champion

1932 Big Six Conference football standings
	Conf.					Overall
Team	W		L		T	W		L		T
Nebraska $	5	–	0	–	0	7	–	1	–	1
Kansas	3	–	2	–	0	5	–	3	–	0
Oklahoma	3	–	2	–	0	4	–	4	–	1
Kansas State	2	–	3	–	0	4	–	4	–	0
Missouri	1	–	3	–	1	1	–	7	–	1
Iowa State	0	–	4	–	1	3	–	4	–	1
$ – Conference champion

1933 Big Six Conference football standings
	Conf.					Overall
Team	W		L		T	W		L		T
No. 2 Nebraska $	5	–	0	–	0	8	–	1	–	0
Kansas State	4	–	1	–	0	6	–	2	–	1
Oklahoma	3	–	2	–	0	4	–	4	–	1
Kansas	2	–	3	–	0	5	–	4	–	1
Iowa State	1	–	4	–	0	3	–	5	–	1
Missouri	0	–	5	–	0	1	–	8	–	0
$ – Conference champion; Rankings from Dickinson System

1934 Big Six Conference football standings
	Conf.					Overall
Team	W		L		T	W		L		T
Kansas State $	5	–	0	–	0	7	–	2	–	1
Nebraska	4	–	1	–	0	6	–	3	–	0
Oklahoma	2	–	2	–	1	3	–	4	–	2
Kansas	1	–	2	–	2	3	–	4	–	3
Iowa State	1	–	3	–	1	5	–	3	–	1
Missouri	0	–	5	–	0	0	–	8	–	1
$ – Conference champion

1935 Big Six Conference football standings
	Conf.					Overall
Team	W		L		T	W		L		T
No. 21 Nebraska $	4	–	0	–	1	6	–	2	–	1
Oklahoma	3	–	2	–	0	6	–	3	–	0
Kansas	2	–	2	–	1	4	–	4	–	1
Kansas State	1	–	2	–	2	2	–	4	–	3
Iowa State	1	–	3	–	1	2	–	4	–	3
Missouri	0	–	2	–	3	3	–	3	–	3
$ – Conference champion; Rankings from United Press

1936 Big Six Conference football standings
	Conf.					Overall
Team	W		L		T	W		L		T
No. 9 Nebraska $	5	–	0	–	0	7	–	2	–	0
Missouri	3	–	1	–	1	6	–	2	–	1
Kansas State	2	–	1	–	2	4	–	3	–	2
Oklahoma	1	–	2	–	2	3	–	3	–	3
Iowa State	1	–	3	–	1	3	–	3	–	2
Kansas	0	–	5	–	0	1	–	6	–	1
$ – Conference champion; Rankings from AP Poll

1937 Big Six Conference football standings
	Conf.					Overall
Team	W		L		T	W		L		T
No. 11 Nebraska $	3	–	0	–	2	6	–	1	–	2
Oklahoma	3	–	1	–	1	5	–	2	–	2
Kansas	2	–	1	–	2	3	–	4	–	2
Missouri	2	–	2	–	1	3	–	6	–	1
Iowa State	1	–	4	–	0	3	–	6	–	0
Kansas State	1	–	4	–	0	4	–	5	–	0
$ – Conference champion; Rankings from AP Poll

1938 Big Six Conference football standings
	Conf.					Overall
Team	W		L		T	W		L		T
No. 4 Oklahoma $	5	–	0	–	0	10	–	1	–	0
Iowa State	3	–	1	–	1	7	–	1	–	1
Missouri	2	–	3	–	0	6	–	3	–	0
Nebraska	2	–	3	–	0	3	–	5	–	1
Kansas State	1	–	3	–	1	4	–	4	–	1
Kansas	1	–	4	–	0	3	–	6	–	0
$ – Conference champion; Rankings from AP Poll

1939 Big Six Conference football standings
	Conf.					Overall
Team	W		L		T	W		L		T
No. 6 Missouri $	5	–	0	–	0	8	–	2	–	0
No. 18 Nebraska	4	–	1	–	0	7	–	1	–	1
No. 19 Oklahoma	3	–	2	–	0	6	–	2	–	1
Kansas	1	–	4	–	0	2	–	6	–	0
Iowa State	1	–	4	–	0	2	–	7	–	0
Kansas State	1	–	4	–	0	4	–	5	–	0
$ – Conference champion; Rankings from AP Poll

1940 Big Six Conference football standings
	Conf.					Overall
Team	W		L		T	W		L		T
No. 7 Nebraska $	5	–	0	–	0	8	–	2	–	0
Oklahoma	4	–	1	–	0	6	–	3	–	0
Missouri	3	–	2	–	0	6	–	3	–	0
Iowa State	2	–	3	–	0	4	–	5	–	0
Kansas State	1	–	4	–	0	2	–	7	–	0
Kansas	0	–	5	–	0	2	–	7	–	0
$ – Conference champion; Rankings from AP Poll

1941 Big Six Conference football standings
	Conf.					Overall
Team	W		L		T	W		L		T
No. 7 Missouri $	5	–	0	–	0	8	–	2	–	0
Nebraska	3	–	2	–	0	4	–	5	–	0
Oklahoma	3	–	2	–	0	6	–	3	–	0
Kansas	2	–	3	–	0	3	–	6	–	0
Kansas State	1	–	3	–	1	2	–	5	–	2
Iowa State	0	–	4	–	1	2	–	6	–	1
$ – Conference champion; Rankings from AP Poll

1942 Big Six Conference football standings
	Conf.					Overall
Team	W		L		T	W		L		T
Missouri $	4	–	0	–	1	8	–	3	–	1
Oklahoma	3	–	1	–	1	3	–	5	–	2
Nebraska	3	–	2	–	0	3	–	7	–	0
Kansas State	2	–	3	–	0	3	–	8	–	0
Iowa State	1	–	4	–	0	3	–	6	–	0
Kansas	1	–	4	–	0	2	–	8	–	0
$ – Conference champion

1943 Big Six Conference football standings
	Conf.					Overall
Team	W		L		T	W		L		T
Oklahoma $	5	–	0	–	0	7	–	2	–	0
Missouri	3	–	2	–	0	3	–	5	–	0
Iowa State	3	–	2	–	0	4	–	4	–	0
Kansas	2	–	3	–	0	4	–	5	–	1
Nebraska	2	–	3	–	0	2	–	6	–	0
Kansas State	0	–	5	–	0	1	–	7	–	0
$ – Conference champion

1944 Big Six Conference football standings
	Conf.					Overall
Team	W		L		T	W		L		T
Oklahoma $	4	–	0	–	1	6	–	3	–	1
Iowa State	3	–	1	–	1	6	–	1	–	1
Missouri	2	–	1	–	2	3	–	5	–	2
Nebraska	2	–	3	–	0	2	–	6	–	0
Kansas	1	–	4	–	0	3	–	6	–	1
Kansas State	1	–	4	–	0	2	–	5	–	2
$ – Conference champion

1945 Big Six Conference football standings
	Conf.					Overall
Team	W		L		T	W		L		T
Missouri $	5	–	0	–	0	6	–	4	–	0
Oklahoma	4	–	1	–	0	5	–	5	–	0
Iowa State	2	–	2	–	1	4	–	3	–	1
Nebraska	2	–	3	–	0	4	–	5	–	0
Kansas	1	–	3	–	1	4	–	5	–	1
Kansas State	0	–	5	–	0	1	–	7	–	0
$ – Conference champion

1946 Big Six Conference football standings
	Conf.					Overall
Team	W		L		T	W		L		T
Kansas +	4	–	1	–	0	7	–	2	–	1
No. 14 Oklahoma +	4	–	1	–	0	8	–	3	–	0
Missouri	3	–	2	–	0	5	–	4	–	1
Nebraska	3	–	2	–	0	3	–	6	–	0
Iowa State	1	–	4	–	0	2	–	6	–	1
Kansas State	0	–	5	–	0	0	–	9	–	0
+ – Conference co-champions; Rankings from AP Poll

1947 Big Six Conference football standings
	Conf.					Overall
Team	W		L		T	W		L		T
No. 12 Kansas +	4	–	0	–	1	8	–	1	–	2
No. 16 Oklahoma +	4	–	0	–	1	7	–	2	–	1
Missouri	3	–	2	–	0	6	–	4	–	0
Nebraska	2	–	3	–	0	2	–	7	–	0
Iowa State	1	–	4	–	0	3	–	6	–	0
Kansas State	0	–	5	–	0	0	–	10	–	0
+ – Conference co-champions; Rankings from AP Poll

=== Big Seven Conference standings ===
1948 Big Seven Conference football standings
	Conf.					Overall
Team	W		L		T	W		L		T
No. 5 Oklahoma $	5	–	0	–	0	10	–	1	–	0
Missouri	5	–	1	–	0	8	–	3	–	0
Kansas	4	–	2	–	0	7	–	3	–	0
Colorado	2	–	3	–	0	3	–	6	–	0
Iowa State	2	–	4	–	0	4	–	6	–	0
Nebraska	2	–	4	–	0	2	–	8	–	0
Kansas State	0	–	6	–	0	1	–	9	–	0
$ – Conference champion; Rankings from AP Poll

1949 Big Seven Conference football standings
	Conf.					Overall
Team	W		L		T	W		L		T
No. 2 Oklahoma $	5	–	0	–	0	11	–	0	–	0
No. 20 Missouri	5	–	1	–	0	7	–	4	–	0
Iowa State	3	–	3	–	0	5	–	3	–	1
Nebraska	3	–	3	–	0	4	–	5	–	0
Kansas	2	–	4	–	0	5	–	5	–	0
Colorado	1	–	4	–	0	3	–	7	–	0
Kansas State	1	–	5	–	0	2	–	8	–	0
$ – Conference champion; Rankings from AP Poll

1950 Big Seven Conference football standings
	Conf.					Overall
Team	W		L		T	W		L		T
No. 1 Oklahoma $	6	–	0	–	0	10	–	1	–	0
No. 17 Nebraska	4	–	2	–	0	6	–	2	–	1
Missouri	3	–	2	–	1	4	–	5	–	1
Kansas	3	–	3	–	0	6	–	4	–	0
Iowa State	2	–	3	–	1	3	–	6	–	1
Colorado	2	–	4	–	0	5	–	4	–	1
Kansas State	0	–	6	–	0	1	–	9	–	1
$ – Conference champion; Rankings from AP Poll

1951 Big Seven Conference football standings
	Conf.					Overall
Team	W		L		T	W		L		T
No. 10 Oklahoma $	6	–	0	–	0	8	–	2	–	0
Colorado	5	–	1	–	0	7	–	3	–	0
Kansas	4	–	2	–	0	8	–	2	–	0
Iowa State	2	–	4	–	0	4	–	4	–	1
Nebraska	2	–	4	–	0	2	–	8	–	0
Missouri	2	–	4	–	0	3	–	7	–	0
Kansas State	0	–	6	–	0	0	–	9	–	0
$ – Conference champion; Rankings from AP Poll

1952 Big Seven Conference football standings
	Conf.					Overall
Team	W		L		T	W		L		T
No. 4 Oklahoma $	5	–	0	–	1	8	–	1	–	1
Missouri	5	–	1	–	0	5	–	5	–	0
Nebraska	3	–	2	–	1	5	–	4	–	1
Kansas	3	–	3	–	0	7	–	3	–	0
Colorado	2	–	2	–	2	6	–	2	–	2
Iowa State	1	–	5	–	0	3	–	6	–	0
Kansas State	0	–	6	–	0	1	–	9	–	0
$ – Conference champion; Rankings from AP Poll

1953 Big Seven Conference football standings
	Conf.					Overall
Team	W		L		T	W		L		T
No. 4 Oklahoma $	6	–	0	–	0	9	–	1	–	1
Missouri	4	–	2	–	0	6	–	4	–	0
Kansas State	4	–	2	–	0	6	–	3	–	1
Colorado	2	–	4	–	0	6	–	4	–	0
Nebraska	2	–	4	–	0	3	–	6	–	1
Kansas	2	–	4	–	0	2	–	8	–	0
Iowa State	1	–	5	–	0	2	–	7	–	0
$ – Conference champion; Rankings from AP Poll

1954 Big Seven Conference football standings
	Conf.					Overall
Team	W		L		T	W		L		T
No. 3 Oklahoma $	6	–	0	–	0	10	–	0	–	0
Nebraska	4	–	2	–	0	6	–	5	–	0
Colorado	3	–	2	–	1	7	–	2	–	1
Missouri	3	–	2	–	1	4	–	5	–	1
Kansas State	3	–	3	–	0	7	–	3	–	0
Iowa State	1	–	5	–	0	3	–	6	–	0
Kansas	0	–	6	–	0	0	–	10	–	0
$ – Conference champion; Rankings from AP Poll

1955 Big Seven Conference football standings
	Conf.					Overall
Team	W		L		T	W		L		T
No. 1 Oklahoma $	6	–	0	–	0	11	–	0	–	0
Nebraska	5	–	1	–	0	5	–	5	–	0
Colorado	3	–	3	–	0	6	–	4	–	0
Kansas State	3	–	3	–	0	4	–	6	–	0
Kansas	1	–	4	–	1	3	–	6	–	1
Iowa State	1	–	4	–	1	1	–	7	–	1
Missouri	1	–	5	–	0	1	–	9	–	0
$ – Conference champion; Rankings from AP Poll

1956 Big Seven Conference football standings
	Conf.					Overall
Team	W		L		T	W		L		T
No. 1 Oklahoma $	6	–	0	–	0	10	–	0	–	0
No. 20 Colorado	4	–	1	–	1	8	–	2	–	1
Missouri	3	–	2	–	1	4	–	5	–	1
Nebraska	3	–	3	–	0	4	–	6	–	0
Kansas	2	–	4	–	0	3	–	6	–	1
Kansas State	2	–	4	–	0	3	–	7	–	0
Iowa State	0	–	6	–	0	2	–	8	–	0
$ – Conference champion; Rankings from AP Poll

1957 Big Seven Conference football standings
	Conf.					Overall
Team	W		L		T	W		L		T
No. 4 Oklahoma $	6	–	0	–	0	10	–	1	–	0
Kansas	4	–	2	–	0	5	–	4	–	1
Missouri	3	–	3	–	0	5	–	4	–	1
Colorado	3	–	3	–	0	6	–	3	–	1
Iowa State	2	–	4	–	0	4	–	5	–	1
Kansas State	2	–	4	–	0	3	–	6	–	1
Nebraska	1	–	5	–	0	1	–	9	–	0
$ – Conference champion; Rankings from AP Poll

1958 Big Seven Conference football standings
	Conf.					Overall
Team	W		L		T	W		L		T
No. 5 Oklahoma $	6	–	0	–	0	10	–	1	–	0
Missouri	4	–	1	–	1	5	–	4	–	1
Colorado	4	–	2	–	0	6	–	4	–	0
Kansas	3	–	2	–	1	4	–	5	–	1
Kansas State	2	–	4	–	0	3	–	7	–	0
Nebraska	1	–	5	–	0	3	–	7	–	0
Iowa State	0	–	6	–	0	4	–	6	–	0
$ – Conference champion; Rankings from AP Poll

1959 Big Seven Conference football standings
	Conf.					Overall
Team	W		L		T	W		L		T
No. 15 Oklahoma $	5	–	1	–	0	7	–	3	–	0
No. 18 Missouri	4	–	2	–	0	6	–	5	–	0
Colorado	3	–	3	–	0	5	–	5	–	0
Iowa State	3	–	3	–	0	7	–	3	–	0
Kansas	3	–	3	–	0	5	–	5	–	0
Nebraska	2	–	4	–	0	4	–	6	–	0
Kansas State	1	–	5	–	0	2	–	8	–	0
$ – Conference champion; Rankings from AP Poll

=== Big Eight Conference standings ===
1960 Big Eight Conference football standings
	Conf.					Overall
Team	W		L		T	W		L		T
No. 5 Missouri $	7	–	0	–	0	11	–	0	–	0
No. 11 Kansas†	6	–	0	–	1	7	–	2	–	1
Colorado	6	–	1	–	0	7	–	3	–	0
Iowa State	4	–	3	–	0	7	–	3	–	0
Oklahoma	2	–	4	–	1	3	–	6	–	1
Nebraska	2	–	5	–	0	4	–	6	–	0
Oklahoma State	2	–	5	–	0	3	–	7	–	0
Kansas State	0	–	7	–	0	1	–	9	–	0
$ – Conference champion; † Kansas' conference victories against Colorado and Missouri were forfeited by Big Eight sanctions, though both are recognized as Kansas victories by Kansas and the NCAA.; Rankings from AP Poll

1961 Big Eight Conference football standings
	Conf.					Overall
Team	W		L		T	W		L		T
No. 7 Colorado $	7	–	0	–	0	9	–	2	–	0
No. 11 Missouri	5	–	2	–	0	7	–	2	–	1
Kansas	5	–	2	–	0	7	–	3	–	1
Oklahoma	4	–	3	–	0	5	–	5	–	0
Iowa State	3	–	4	–	0	5	–	5	–	0
Oklahoma State	2	–	5	–	0	4	–	6	–	0
Nebraska	2	–	5	–	0	3	–	6	–	1
Kansas State	0	–	7	–	0	2	–	8	–	0
$ – Conference champion; Rankings from AP Poll

1962 Big Eight Conference football standings
	Conf.					Overall
Team	W		L		T	W		L		T
No. 8 Oklahoma $	7	–	0	–	0	8	–	3	–	0
Missouri	5	–	1	–	1	8	–	1	–	2
Nebraska	5	–	2	–	0	9	–	2	–	0
Kansas	4	–	2	–	1	6	–	3	–	1
Iowa State	3	–	4	–	0	5	–	5	–	0
Oklahoma State	2	–	5	–	0	4	–	6	–	0
Colorado	1	–	6	–	0	2	–	8	–	0
Kansas State	0	–	7	–	0	0	–	10	–	0
$ – Conference champion; Rankings from AP Poll

1963 Big Eight Conference football standings
	Conf.					Overall
Team	W		L		T	W		L		T
No. 6 Nebraska $	7	–	0	–	0	10	–	1	–	0
No. 9 Oklahoma	6	–	1	–	0	8	–	2	–	0
Missouri	5	–	2	–	0	7	–	3	–	0
Kansas	3	–	4	–	0	5	–	5	–	0
Iowa State	3	–	4	–	0	4	–	5	–	0
Colorado	2	–	5	–	0	2	–	8	–	0
Kansas State	1	–	5	–	0	2	–	7	–	0
Oklahoma State	0	–	6	–	0	1	–	8	–	0
$ – Conference champion; Rankings from AP Poll

1964 Big Eight Conference football standings
	Conf.					Overall
Team	W		L		T	W		L		T
No. 6 Nebraska $	6	–	1	–	0	9	–	2	–	0
Oklahoma	5	–	1	–	1	6	–	4	–	1
Kansas	5	–	2	–	0	6	–	4	–	0
Missouri	4	–	2	–	1	6	–	3	–	1
Oklahoma State	3	–	4	–	0	4	–	6	–	0
Kansas State	3	–	4	–	0	3	–	7	–	0
Colorado	1	–	6	–	0	2	–	8	–	0
Iowa State	0	–	7	–	0	1	–	8	–	1
$ – Conference champion; Rankings from AP Poll

1965 Big Eight Conference football standings
	Conf.					Overall
Team	W		L		T	W		L		T
No. 5 Nebraska $	7	–	0	–	0	10	–	1	–	0
No. 6 Missouri	6	–	1	–	0	8	–	2	–	1
Colorado	4	–	2	–	1	6	–	2	–	2
Iowa State	3	–	3	–	1	5	–	4	–	1
Oklahoma	3	–	4	–	0	3	–	7	–	0
Oklahoma State	2	–	5	–	0	3	–	7	–	0
Kansas	2	–	5	–	0	2	–	8	–	0
Kansas State	0	–	7	–	0	0	–	10	–	0
$ – Conference champion; Rankings from AP Poll

1966 Big Eight Conference football standings
	Conf.					Overall
Team	W		L		T	W		L		T
No. 6 Nebraska $	6	–	1	–	0	9	–	2	–	0
Colorado	5	–	2	–	0	7	–	3	–	0
Missouri	4	–	2	–	1	6	–	3	–	1
Oklahoma State	4	–	2	–	1	4	–	5	–	1
Oklahoma	4	–	3	–	0	6	–	4	–	0
Iowa State	2	–	3	–	2	2	–	6	–	2
Kansas	0	–	6	–	1	2	–	7	–	1
Kansas State	0	–	6	–	1	0	–	9	–	1
$ – Conference champion; Rankings from AP Poll

1967 Big Eight Conference football standings
	Conf.					Overall
Team	W		L		T	W		L		T
No. 3 Oklahoma $	7	–	0	–	0	10	–	1	–	0
Colorado	5	–	2	–	0	9	–	2	–	0
Kansas	5	–	2	–	0	5	–	5	–	0
Missouri	4	–	3	–	0	7	–	3	–	0
Nebraska	3	–	4	–	0	6	–	4	–	0
Oklahoma State	3	–	4	–	0	4	–	5	–	1
Iowa State	1	–	6	–	0	2	–	8	–	0
Kansas State	0	–	7	–	0	1	–	9	–	0
$ – Conference champion; Rankings from AP Poll

1968 Big Eight Conference football standings
	Conf.					Overall
Team	W		L		T	W		L		T
No. 7 Kansas +	6	–	1	–	0	9	–	2	–	0
No. 11 Oklahoma +	6	–	1	–	0	7	–	4	–	0
No. 9 Missouri	5	–	2	–	0	8	–	3	–	0
Nebraska	3	–	4	–	0	6	–	4	–	0
Colorado	3	–	4	–	0	4	–	6	–	0
Kansas State	2	–	5	–	0	4	–	6	–	0
Oklahoma State	2	–	5	–	0	3	–	7	–	0
Iowa State	1	–	6	–	0	3	–	7	–	0
+ – Conference co-champions; Rankings from AP Poll

1969 Big Eight Conference football standings
	Conf.					Overall
Team	W		L		T	W		L		T
No. 6 Missouri +	6	–	1	–	0	9	–	2	–	0
No. 11 Nebraska +	6	–	1	–	0	9	–	2	–	0
No. 16 Colorado	5	–	2	–	0	8	–	3	–	0
Oklahoma	4	–	3	–	0	6	–	4	–	0
Kansas State	3	–	4	–	0	5	–	5	–	0
Oklahoma State	3	–	4	–	0	5	–	5	–	0
Iowa State	1	–	6	–	0	3	–	7	–	0
Kansas	0	–	7	–	0	1	–	9	–	0
+ – Conference co-champions; Rankings from AP Poll

1970 Big Eight Conference football standings
	Conf.					Overall
Team	W		L		T	W		L		T
No. 1 Nebraska $	7	–	0	–	0	11	–	0	–	1
No. 20 Oklahoma	5	–	2	–	0	7	–	4	–	1
Kansas State	5	–	2	–	0	6	–	5	–	0
Missouri	3	–	4	–	0	5	–	6	–	0
Colorado	3	–	4	–	0	6	–	5	–	0
Kansas	2	–	5	–	0	5	–	6	–	0
Oklahoma State	2	–	5	–	0	4	–	7	–	0
Iowa State	1	–	6	–	0	5	–	6	–	0
$ – Conference champion; Rankings from AP Poll

1971 Big Eight Conference football standings
	Conf.					Overall
Team	W		L		T	W		L		T
No. 1 Nebraska $	7	–	0	–	0	13	–	0	–	0
No. 2 Oklahoma	6	–	1	–	0	11	–	1	–	0
No. 3 Colorado	5	–	2	–	0	10	–	2	–	0
Iowa State	4	–	3	–	0	8	–	4	–	0
Kansas State	2	–	5	–	0	5	–	6	–	0
Oklahoma State	2	–	5	–	0	4	–	6	–	1
Kansas	2	–	5	–	0	4	–	7	–	0
Missouri	0	–	7	–	0	1	–	10	–	0
$ – Conference champion; Rankings from AP Poll

1972 Big Eight Conference football standings
	Conf.					Overall
Team	W		L		T	W		L		T
No. 2 Oklahoma $	6	–	1	–	0	11	–	1	–	0
No. 4 Nebraska $	5	–	1	–	1	9	–	2	–	1
No. 16 Colorado	4	–	3	–	0	8	–	4	–	0
Oklahoma State	4	–	3	–	0	6	–	5	–	0
Missouri	3	–	4	–	0	6	–	6	–	0
Iowa State	2	–	4	–	1	5	–	6	–	1
Kansas	2	–	5	–	0	4	–	7	–	0
Kansas State	1	–	6	–	0	3	–	8	–	0
$ – Conference champion; The Big 8 Conference mandated Oklahoma forfeits in three conference games, giving Nebraska the title. Oklahoma reverted this record at a later date; hence, both Oklahoma and Nebraska claim this title.; Rankings from AP Poll

1973 Big Eight Conference football standings
	Conf.					Overall
Team	W		L		T	W		L		T
No. 3 Oklahoma $	7	–	0	–	0	10	–	0	–	1
No. 7 Nebraska	4	–	2	–	1	9	–	2	–	1
No. 18 Kansas	4	–	2	–	1	7	–	4	–	1
No. 17 Missouri	3	–	4	–	0	8	–	4	–	0
Oklahoma State	2	–	3	–	2	5	–	4	–	2
Colorado	2	–	5	–	0	5	–	6	–	0
Kansas State	2	–	5	–	0	5	–	6	–	0
Iowa State	2	–	5	–	0	4	–	7	–	0
$ – Conference champion; Rankings from AP Poll

1974 Big Eight Conference football standings
	Conf.					Overall
Team	W		L		T	W		L		T
No. 1 Oklahoma $	7	–	0	–	0	11	–	0	–	0
Missouri	5	–	2	–	0	7	–	4	–	0
No. 9 Nebraska	5	–	2	–	0	9	–	3	–	0
Oklahoma State	4	–	3	–	0	7	–	5	–	0
Colorado	3	–	4	–	0	5	–	6	–	0
Iowa State	2	–	5	–	0	4	–	7	–	0
Kansas	1	–	6	–	0	4	–	7	–	0
Kansas State	1	–	6	–	0	4	–	7	–	0
$ – Conference champion; Rankings from AP Poll

1975 Big Eight Conference football standings
	Conf.					Overall
Team	W		L		T	W		L		T
No. 1 Oklahoma +	6	–	1	–	0	11	–	1	–	0
No. 9 Nebraska +	6	–	1	–	0	10	–	2	–	0
No. 16 Colorado	5	–	2	–	0	9	–	3	–	0
Kansas	4	–	3	–	0	7	–	5	–	0
Missouri	3	–	4	–	0	6	–	5	–	0
Oklahoma State	3	–	4	–	0	7	–	4	–	0
Iowa State	1	–	6	–	0	4	–	7	–	0
Kansas State	0	–	7	–	0	3	–	8	–	0
+ – Conference co-champions; Rankings from AP Poll

1976 Big Eight Conference football standings
	Conf.					Overall
Team	W		L		T	W		L		T
No. 16 Colorado +	5	–	2	–	0	8	–	4	–	0
No. 14 Oklahoma State +	5	–	2	–	0	9	–	3	–	0
No. 5 Oklahoma +	5	–	2	–	0	9	–	2	–	1
No. 19 Iowa State	4	–	3	–	0	8	–	3	–	0
No. 9 Nebraska	4	–	3	–	0	9	–	3	–	1
Missouri	3	–	4	–	0	6	–	5	–	0
Kansas	2	–	5	–	0	6	–	5	–	0
Kansas State	0	–	7	–	0	1	–	10	–	0
+ – Conference co-champions; Rankings from AP Poll

1977 Big Eight Conference football standings
	Conf.					Overall
Team	W		L		T	W		L		T
No. 7 Oklahoma $	7	–	0	–	0	10	–	2	–	0
Iowa State	5	–	2	–	0	8	–	4	–	0
No. 12 Nebraska	5	–	2	–	0	9	–	3	–	0
Colorado	3	–	3	–	1	7	–	3	–	1
Missouri	3	–	4	–	0	4	–	7	–	0
Kansas	2	–	4	–	1	4	–	6	–	1
Oklahoma State	2	–	5	–	0	4	–	7	–	0
Kansas State	0	–	7	–	0	2	–	9	–	0
$ – Conference champion; Rankings from AP Poll

1978 Big Eight Conference football standings
	Conf.					Overall
Team	W		L		T	W		L		T
No. 3 Oklahoma +	6	–	1	–	0	11	–	1	–	0
No. 8 Nebraska +	6	–	1	–	0	9	–	3	–	0
No. 15 Missouri	4	–	3	–	0	8	–	4	–	0
Iowa State	4	–	3	–	0	8	–	4	–	0
Kansas State	3	–	4	–	0	4	–	7	–	0
Oklahoma State	3	–	4	–	0	3	–	8	–	0
Colorado	2	–	5	–	0	6	–	5	–	0
Kansas	0	–	7	–	0	1	–	10	–	0
+ – Conference co-champions; Rankings from AP Poll

1979 Big Eight Conference football standings
	Conf.					Overall
Team	W		L		T	W		L		T
No. 3 Oklahoma $	7	–	0	–	0	11	–	1	–	0
No. 9 Nebraska	6	–	1	–	0	10	–	2	–	0
Oklahoma State	5	–	2	–	0	7	–	4	–	0
Missouri	3	–	4	–	0	7	–	5	–	0
Colorado	2	–	5	–	0	3	–	8	–	0
Iowa State	2	–	5	–	0	3	–	8	–	0
Kansas	2	–	5	–	0	3	–	8	–	0
Kansas State	1	–	6	–	0	3	–	8	–	0
$ – Conference champion; Rankings from AP Poll

1980 Big Eight Conference football standings
	Conf.					Overall
Team	W		L		T	W		L		T
No. 3 Oklahoma $	7	–	0	–	0	10	–	2	–	0
No. 7 Nebraska	6	–	1	–	0	10	–	2	–	0
Missouri	5	–	2	–	0	8	–	4	–	0
Iowa State	3	–	4	–	0	7	–	4	–	0
Oklahoma State	3	–	4	–	0	4	–	7	–	0
Kansas State	2	–	5	–	0	4	–	7	–	0
Kansas	1	–	6	–	0	2	–	8	–	1
Colorado	1	–	6	–	0	1	–	10	–	0
$ – Conference champion; Rankings from AP Poll

1981 Big Eight Conference football standings
	Conf.					Overall
Team	W		L		T	W		L		T
No. 11 Nebraska $	7	–	0	–	0	9	–	3	–	0
No. 20 Oklahoma	4	–	2	–	1	7	–	4	–	1
Kansas	4	–	3	–	0	7	–	5	–	0
Oklahoma State	4	–	3	–	0	7	–	5	–	0
No. 19 Missouri	3	–	4	–	0	8	–	4	–	0
Iowa State	2	–	4	–	1	5	–	5	–	1
Colorado	2	–	5	–	0	3	–	8	–	0
Kansas State	1	–	6	–	0	2	–	9	–	0
$ – Conference champion; Rankings from AP Poll

1982 Big Eight Conference football standings
	Conf.					Overall
Team	W		L		T	W		L		T
No. 3 Nebraska $	7	–	0	–	0	12	–	1	–	0
No. 16 Oklahoma	6	–	1	–	0	8	–	4	–	0
Oklahoma State	3	–	2	–	2	4	–	5	–	2
Kansas State	3	–	3	–	1	6	–	5	–	1
Missouri	2	–	3	–	2	5	–	4	–	2
Iowa State	1	–	5	–	1	4	–	6	–	1
Kansas	1	–	5	–	1	2	–	7	–	2
Colorado	1	–	5	–	1	2	–	8	–	1
$ – Conference champion; Rankings from AP Poll

1983 Big Eight Conference football standings
	Conf.					Overall
Team	W		L		T	W		L		T
No. 2 Nebraska $	7	–	0	–	0	12	–	1	–	0
Missouri	5	–	2	–	0	7	–	5	–	0
Oklahoma	5	–	2	–	0	8	–	4	–	0
Oklahoma State	3	–	4	–	0	8	–	4	–	0
Iowa State	3	–	4	–	0	4	–	7	–	0
Kansas	2	–	5	–	0	4	–	6	–	1
Colorado	2	–	5	–	0	4	–	7	–	0
Kansas State	1	–	6	–	0	3	–	8	–	0
$ – Conference champion; Rankings from AP Poll

1984 Big Eight Conference football standings
	Conf.					Overall
Team	W		L		T	W		L		T
No. 4 Nebraska +	6	–	1	–	0	10	–	2	–	0
No. 6 Oklahoma +	6	–	1	–	0	9	–	2	–	1
No. 7 Oklahoma State	5	–	2	–	0	10	–	2	–	0
Kansas	4	–	3	–	0	5	–	6	–	0
Missouri	2	–	4	–	1	3	–	7	–	1
Kansas State	2	–	4	–	1	3	–	7	–	1
Colorado	1	–	6	–	0	1	–	10	–	0
Iowa State	0	–	5	–	2	2	–	7	–	2
+ – Conference co-champions; Rankings from AP Poll

1985 Big Eight Conference football standings
	Conf.					Overall
Team	W		L		T	W		L		T
No. 1 Oklahoma $	7	–	0	–	0	11	–	1	–	0
No. 11 Nebraska	6	–	1	–	0	9	–	3	–	0
Oklahoma State	4	–	3	–	0	8	–	4	–	0
Colorado	4	–	3	–	0	7	–	5	–	0
Iowa State	3	–	4	–	0	5	–	6	–	0
Kansas	2	–	5	–	0	6	–	6	–	0
Kansas State	1	–	6	–	0	1	–	10	–	0
Missouri	1	–	6	–	0	1	–	10	–	0
$ – Conference champion; Rankings from AP Poll

1986 Big Eight Conference football standings
	Conf.					Overall
Team	W		L		T	W		L		T
No. 3 Oklahoma $	7	–	0	–	0	11	–	1	–	0
Colorado	6	–	1	–	0	6	–	6	–	0
No. 5 Nebraska	5	–	2	–	0	10	–	2	–	0
Oklahoma State	4	–	3	–	0	6	–	5	–	0
Iowa State	3	–	4	–	0	6	–	5	–	0
Missouri	2	–	5	–	0	3	–	8	–	0
Kansas State	1	–	6	–	0	2	–	9	–	0
Kansas	0	–	7	–	0	3	–	8	–	0
$ – Conference champion; Rankings from AP Poll

1987 Big Eight Conference football standings
	Conf.					Overall
Team	W		L		T	W		L		T
No. 3 Oklahoma $	7	–	0	–	0	11	–	1	–	0
No. 6 Nebraska	6	–	1	–	0	10	–	2	–	0
No. 11 Oklahoma State	5	–	2	–	0	10	–	2	–	0
Colorado	4	–	3	–	0	7	–	4	–	0
Missouri	3	–	4	–	0	5	–	6	–	0
Iowa State	2	–	5	–	0	3	–	8	–	0
Kansas	0	–	6	–	1	1	–	9	–	1
Kansas State	0	–	6	–	1	0	–	10	–	1
$ – Conference champion; Rankings from AP Poll

1988 Big Eight Conference football standings
	Conf.					Overall
Team	W		L		T	W		L		T
No. 10 Nebraska $	7	–	0	–	0	11	–	2	–	0
No. 14 Oklahoma	6	–	1	–	0	9	–	3	–	0
No. 11 Oklahoma State	5	–	2	–	0	10	–	2	–	0
Colorado	4	–	3	–	0	8	–	4	–	0
Iowa State	3	–	4	–	0	5	–	6	–	0
Missouri	2	–	5	–	0	3	–	7	–	1
Kansas	1	–	6	–	0	1	–	10	–	0
Kansas State	0	–	7	–	0	0	–	11	–	0
$ – Conference champion; Rankings from AP Poll

1989 Big Eight Conference football standings
	Conf.					Overall
Team	W		L		T	W		L		T
No. 4 Colorado $	7	–	0	–	0	11	–	1	–	0
No. 11 Nebraska	6	–	1	–	0	10	–	2	–	0
Oklahoma	5	–	2	–	0	7	–	4	–	0
Iowa State	4	–	3	–	0	6	–	5	–	0
Oklahoma State	3	–	4	–	0	4	–	7	–	0
Kansas	2	–	5	–	0	4	–	7	–	0
Missouri	1	–	6	–	0	2	–	9	–	0
Kansas State	0	–	7	–	0	1	–	10	–	0
$ – Conference champion; Rankings from AP Poll

1990 Big Eight Conference football standings
	Conf.					Overall
Team	W		L		T	W		L		T
No. 1 Colorado $	7	–	0	–	0	11	–	1	–	1
No. 24 Nebraska	5	–	2	–	0	9	–	3	–	0
No. 17 Oklahoma	5	–	2	–	0	8	–	3	–	0
Iowa State	2	–	4	–	1	4	–	6	–	1
Kansas	2	–	4	–	1	3	–	7	–	1
Kansas State	2	–	5	–	0	5	–	6	–	0
Missouri	2	–	5	–	0	4	–	7	–	0
Oklahoma State	2	–	5	–	0	4	–	7	–	0
$ – Conference champion; Rankings from AP Poll

1991 Big Eight Conference football standings
	Conf.					Overall
Team	W		L		T	W		L		T
No. 15 Nebraska +	6	–	0	–	1	9	–	2	–	1
No. 20 Colorado +	6	–	0	–	1	8	–	3	–	1
No. 16 Oklahoma	5	–	2	–	0	9	–	3	–	0
Kansas State	4	–	3	–	0	7	–	4	–	0
Kansas	3	–	4	–	0	6	–	5	–	0
Iowa State	1	–	5	–	1	3	–	7	–	1
Missouri	1	–	6	–	0	3	–	7	–	1
Oklahoma State	0	–	6	–	1	0	–	10	–	1
+ – Conference co-champions; Rankings from AP Poll

1992 Big Eight Conference football standings
	Conf.					Overall
Team	W		L		T	W		L		T
No. 14 Nebraska $	6	–	1	–	0	9	–	3	–	0
No. 13 Colorado %	5	–	1	–	1	9	–	2	–	1
No. 22 Kansas	4	–	3	–	0	8	–	4	–	0
Oklahoma	3	–	2	–	2	5	–	4	–	2
Oklahoma State	2	–	4	–	1	3	–	7	–	1
Kansas State	2	–	5	–	0	5	–	6	–	0
Iowa State	2	–	5	–	0	4	–	7	–	0
Missouri	2	–	5	–	0	3	–	8	–	0
$ – Bowl Coalition representative as champion % – Bowl Coalition at-large representative; Rankings from AP Poll

1993 Big Eight Conference football standings
	Conf.					Overall
Team	W		L		T	W		L		T
No. 3 Nebraska $	7	–	0	–	0	11	–	1	–	0
No. 16 Colorado	5	–	1	–	1	8	–	3	–	1
No. 20 Kansas State	4	–	2	–	1	9	–	2	–	1
No. 17 Oklahoma %	4	–	3	–	0	9	–	3	–	0
Kansas	3	–	4	–	0	5	–	7	–	0
Missouri	2	–	5	–	0	3	–	7	–	1
Iowa State	2	–	5	–	0	3	–	8	–	0
Oklahoma State	0	–	7	–	0	3	–	8	–	0
$ – Bowl Coalition representative as champion % – Bowl Coalition at-large representative; Rankings from AP Poll

1994 Big Eight Conference football standings
	Conf.					Overall
Team	W		L		T	W		L		T
No. 1 Nebraska $	7	–	0	–	0	13	–	0	–	0
No. 3 Colorado %	6	–	1	–	0	11	–	1	–	0
No. 19 Kansas State	5	–	2	–	0	9	–	3	–	0
Oklahoma	4	–	3	–	0	6	–	6	–	0
Kansas	3	–	4	–	0	6	–	5	–	0
Missouri	2	–	5	–	0	3	–	8	–	1
Oklahoma State	0	–	6	–	1	3	–	7	–	1
Iowa State	0	–	6	–	1	0	–	10	–	1
$ – Bowl Coalition representative as champion % – Bowl Coalition at-large representative; Rankings from AP Poll

1995 Big Eight Conference football standings
	Conf.					Overall
Team	W		L		T	W		L		T
No. 1 Nebraska $	7	–	0	–	0	12	–	0	–	0
No. 5 Colorado	5	–	2	–	0	10	–	2	–	0
No. 7 Kansas State	5	–	2	–	0	10	–	2	–	0
No. 9 Kansas	5	–	2	–	0	10	–	2	–	0
Oklahoma	2	–	5	–	0	5	–	5	–	1
Oklahoma State	2	–	5	–	0	4	–	8	–	0
Missouri	1	–	6	–	0	3	–	8	–	0
Iowa State	1	–	6	–	0	3	–	8	–	0
$ – Bowl Alliance representative as champion; Rankings from AP Poll
