= 1925 Simmons Cowboys football team =

American college football season

1925 Simmons Cowboys football
- Conference: Texas Intercollegiate Athletic Association
- Record: 7–2 (6–1 TIAA)
- Head coach: P. E. Shotwell (2nd season)
- Home stadium: Parramore Field

1925 Texas Intercollegiate Athletic Association football standings
| | Conf. | | | | | Overall |
| Team | W | | L | | T | W | | L | | T |
|---|---|---|---|---|---|---|---|---|---|---|
| Southwestern (TX) $ | 4 | – | 0 | – | 1 | 5 | – | 3 | – | 1 |
| Simmons (TX) | 6 | – | 1 | – | 0 | 7 | – | 2 | – | 0 |
| Howard Payne | 4 | – | 1 | – | 1 | 5 | – | 3 | – | 1 |
| Trinity (TX) | 4 | – | 2 | – | 0 | 9 | – | 3 | – | 0 |
| North Texas State Teachers | 4 | – | 2 | – | 0 | 6 | – | 4 | – | 0 |
| Abilene Christian | 2 | – | 1 | – | 1 | 2 | – | 5 | – | 2 |
| Austin | 2 | – | 3 | – | 0 | 4 | – | 4 | – | 1 |
| Sam Houston State | 1 | – | 2 | – | 0 | 5 | – | 4 | – | 0 |
| East Texas State | 2 | – | 4 | – | 0 | 2 | – | 8 | – | 0 |
| West Texas State | 1 | – | 3 | – | 0 | 4 | – | 4 | – | 0 |
| St. Edward's | 1 | – | 3 | – | 1 | 3 | – | 4 | – | 1 |
| Southwest Texas State | 1 | – | 6 | – | 0 | 2 | – | 6 | – | 0 |
| Daniel Baker | 0 | – | 4 | – | 2 | 2 | – | 6 | – | 2 |
$ – Conference champion

The 1925 Simmons Cowboys football team was an American football team that represented Simmons University—now known as Hardin–Simmons University—as a member of the Texas Intercollegiate Athletic Association (TIAA) during the 1925 college football season. In its second and final season under head coach P. E. Shotwell, the team compiled a 7–2 record and outscored all opponents by a total of 151 to 74. The team played its home games at Parramore Field in Abilene, Texas.

== Schedule ==
| Date | Opponent | Site | Result | Attendance | Source |
|---|---|---|---|---|---|
| September 26 | St. Edward's | Parramore Field; Abilene, TX | W 33–0 | | |
| October 3 | Southwestern State (OK) | Parramore Field; Abilene, TX | W 16–0 | | |
| October 17 | at TCU | Clark Field; Fort Worth, TX | L 16–28 | 4,000 | |
| October 24 | West Texas State | Parramore Field; Abilene, TX | W 20–6 | | |
| October 31 | at Daniel Baker | Brownwood, TX | W 24–7 | | |
| November 6 | North Texas State Teachers | Parramore Field; Abilene, TX | W 10–0 | | |
| November 11 | at Trinity (TX) | Yoakum Field; Waxahachie, TX | W 9–7 | | |
| November 18 | at East Texas State | Commerce, TX | W 17–0 | | |
| November 26 | Howard Payne | Parramore Field; Abilene, TX | L 6–26 | | |
