= 1925 Daniel Baker Hill Billies football team =

American college football season

1925 Daniel Baker Hill Billies football
- Conference: Texas Intercollegiate Athletic Association
- Record: 2–6–2 (0–4–2 TIAA)
- Head coach: Shorty Ransom (1st season)
- Captain: Wyman McInnis

1925 Texas Intercollegiate Athletic Association football standings
	Conf.					Overall
Team	W		L		T	W		L		T
Southwestern (TX) $	4	–	0	–	1	5	–	3	–	1
Simmons (TX)	6	–	1	–	0	7	–	2	–	0
Howard Payne	4	–	1	–	1	5	–	3	–	1
Trinity (TX)	4	–	2	–	0	9	–	3	–	0
North Texas State Teachers	4	–	2	–	0	6	–	4	–	0
Abilene Christian	2	–	1	–	1	2	–	5	–	2
Austin	2	–	3	–	0	4	–	4	–	1
Sam Houston State	1	–	2	–	0	5	–	4	–	0
East Texas State	2	–	4	–	0	2	–	8	–	0
West Texas State	1	–	3	–	0	4	–	4	–	0
St. Edward's	1	–	3	–	1	3	–	4	–	1
Southwest Texas State	1	–	6	–	0	2	–	6	–	0
Daniel Baker	0	–	4	–	2	2	–	6	–	2
$ – Conference champion

The 1925 Daniel Baker Hill Billies football team represented Daniel Baker College as a member of the Texas Intercollegiate Athletic Association (TIAA) during the 1925 college football season. Led by Shorty Ransom in his first season as head coach, the team compiled an overall record of 2–6–2 with a mark of 0–4–2 in TIAA play, placing last out of 13 teams in the TIAA.

== Schedule ==
Date	Time	Opponent	Site	Result	Source
September 18		at McMurry*	Abilene, TX	W 2–0	
September 25		Schreiner*	Brownwood, TX	L 0–6	
October 3	3:00 p.m.	at TCU*	Clark Field; Fort Worth, TX	L 0–12	
October 10		Sul Ross*	Brownwood, TX	W 7–0	
October 17		at Austin	Cashion Field; Sherman, TX	L 0–21	
October 24		vs. St. Edward's	Army Post Stadium; San Antonio, TX	T 6–6	
October 31		Simmons (TX)	Brownwood, TX	L 7–24	
November 11		at North Texas State Teachers	Denton, TX	L 8–13	
November 20		at West Texas State	Canyon, TX	L 12–15	
November 26		Abilene Christian	Brownwood, TX	T 7–7	
*Non-conference game; All times are in Central time
