= 1925 Austin Kangaroos football team =

American college football season

1925 Austin Kangaroos football
- Conference: Texas Intercollegiate Athletic Association
- Record: 4–4–1 (2–3 TIAA)
- Head coach: Pete Cawthon (3rd season)
- Captain: Adam Cone
- Home stadium: Cashion Field

1925 Texas Intercollegiate Athletic Association football standings
	Conf.					Overall
Team	W		L		T	W		L		T
Southwestern (TX) $	4	–	0	–	1	5	–	3	–	1
Simmons (TX)	6	–	1	–	0	7	–	2	–	0
Howard Payne	4	–	1	–	1	5	–	3	–	1
Trinity (TX)	4	–	2	–	0	9	–	3	–	0
North Texas State Teachers	4	–	2	–	0	6	–	4	–	0
Abilene Christian	2	–	1	–	1	2	–	5	–	2
Austin	2	–	3	–	0	4	–	4	–	1
Sam Houston State	1	–	2	–	0	5	–	4	–	0
East Texas State	2	–	4	–	0	2	–	8	–	0
West Texas State	1	–	3	–	0	4	–	4	–	0
St. Edward's	1	–	3	–	1	3	–	4	–	1
Southwest Texas State	1	–	6	–	0	2	–	6	–	0
Daniel Baker	0	–	4	–	2	2	–	6	–	2
$ – Conference champion

The 1925 Austin Kangaroos football team was an American football team that represented Austin College as a member of the Texas Intercollegiate Athletic Association (TIAA) during the 1925 college football season. Led by Pete Cawthon in his third season as head coach, the team compiled an overall record of 4–4–1 with a mark of 2–3 in TIAA play. The team's captain was Adam Cone. Eddie Dyer and Dell Morgan were assistant coaches. Henry Frnka played halfback.

== Schedule ==
Date	Time	Opponent	Site	Result	Attendance	Source
September 25		East Central*	Cashion Field; Sherman, TX	W 9–0		
October 2		East Texas State	Cashion Field; Sherman, TX	W 28–0		
October 9		at Texas Tech*	South Plains Fairgrounds; Lubbock, TX	T 3–3		
October 16		Daniel Baker	Cashion Field; Sherman, TX	W 23–0		
October 22		vs. Southwestern (TX)	Temple, TX	L 3–9		
October 30	3:00 p.m.	Trinity (TX)	Cashion Field; Sherman, TX	L 0–16	2,500	
November 11		at Howard Payne	Brownwood, TX	L 0–19		
November 18		at Henderson-Brown*	Arkadelphia, AR	W 7–0		
November 26		at TCU*	Clark Field; Fort Worth, TX	L 0–21	3,000	
*Non-conference game; All times are in Central time
