= 1925 North Texas State Teachers Eagles football team =

American college football season

1925 North Texas State Teachers Eagles football
- Conference: Texas Intercollegiate Athletic Association
- Record: 6–4 (4–2 TIAA)
- Head coach: John B. Reid (1st season)
- Home stadium: Eagle Field

1925 Texas Intercollegiate Athletic Association football standings
| | Conf. | | | | | Overall |
| Team | W | | L | | T | W | | L | | T |
|---|---|---|---|---|---|---|---|---|---|---|
| Southwestern (TX) $ | 4 | – | 0 | – | 1 | 5 | – | 3 | – | 1 |
| Simmons (TX) | 6 | – | 1 | – | 0 | 7 | – | 2 | – | 0 |
| Howard Payne | 4 | – | 1 | – | 1 | 5 | – | 3 | – | 1 |
| Trinity (TX) | 4 | – | 2 | – | 0 | 9 | – | 3 | – | 0 |
| North Texas State Teachers | 4 | – | 2 | – | 0 | 6 | – | 4 | – | 0 |
| Abilene Christian | 2 | – | 1 | – | 1 | 2 | – | 5 | – | 2 |
| Austin | 2 | – | 3 | – | 0 | 4 | – | 4 | – | 1 |
| Sam Houston State | 1 | – | 2 | – | 0 | 5 | – | 4 | – | 0 |
| East Texas State | 2 | – | 4 | – | 0 | 2 | – | 8 | – | 0 |
| West Texas State | 1 | – | 3 | – | 0 | 4 | – | 4 | – | 0 |
| St. Edward's | 1 | – | 3 | – | 1 | 3 | – | 4 | – | 1 |
| Southwest Texas State | 1 | – | 6 | – | 0 | 2 | – | 6 | – | 0 |
| Daniel Baker | 0 | – | 4 | – | 2 | 2 | – | 6 | – | 2 |
$ – Conference champion

The 1925 North Texas State Teachers Eagles football team was an American football team that represented the North Texas State Teachers College (now known as the University of North Texas) during the 1925 college football season as a member of the Texas Intercollegiate Athletic Association. In their first year under head coach John B. Reid, the team compiled a 6–4 record.

== Schedule ==
| Date | Opponent | Site | Result | Source |
|---|---|---|---|---|
| September 26 | at SMU* | Fair Park Stadium; Dallas, TX (rivalry) | L 0–48 | |
| October 3 | at Baylor* | Carroll Field; Waco, TX | L 6–20 | |
| October 9 | Decatur Baptist* | Eagle Field; Denton, TX | W 27–0 | |
| October 16 | Stephen F. Austin* | Eagle Field; Denton, TX | W 10–0 | |
| October 23 | East Texas State | Eagle Field; Denton, TX | W 33–13 | |
| November 1 | at West Texas State | Canyon, TX | W 6–0 | |
| November 6 | at Simmons (TX) | Parramore Field; Abilene, TX | L 0–10 | |
| November 11 | Daniel Baker | Eagle Field; Denton, TX | W 13–8 | |
| November 19 | at Southwest Texas State | Evans Field; San Marcos, TX | W 10–6 | |
| November 26 | Trinity (TX) | Eagle Field; Denton, TX | L 6–16 | |
*Non-conference game
