= 1925 Baylor Bears football team =

American college football season

1925 Baylor Bears football
- Conference: Southwest Conference
- Record: 3–5–2 (0–3–2 SWC)
- Head coach: Frank Bridges (6th season)
- Captain: Homer D. Walker
- Home stadium: Carroll Field; Cotton Palace

1925 Southwest Conference football standings
	Conf.					Overall
Team	W		L		T	W		L		T
Texas A&M $	4	–	1	–	0	7	–	1	–	1
TCU	2	–	0	–	1	7	–	1	–	1
Texas	2	–	1	–	1	6	–	2	–	1
SMU	1	–	1	–	2	5	–	2	–	2
Rice	1	–	2	–	1	4	–	4	–	1
Arkansas	1	–	2	–	1	4	–	4	–	1
Baylor	0	–	3	–	2	3	–	5	–	2
$ – Conference champion

The 1925 Baylor Bears football team was an American football team that represented Baylor University in the Southwest Conference (SWC) during the 1925 college football season. In its sixth and final season under head coach Frank Bridges, the team compiled a 3–5–2 record (0–3–2 against conference opponents), finished in last place in the conference, and was outscored by a total of 115 to 79. The team played its home games at Carroll Field and the Cotton Palace in Waco, Texas. Homer D. Walker was the team captain.

== Schedule ==
Date	Time	Opponent	Site	Result	Attendance	Source
September 26		at Notre Dame*	Cartier Field; South Bend, IN	L 0–41	13,000	
October 3		North Texas State Teachers*	Carroll Field; Waco, TX	W 20–6		
October 13	3:00 p.m.	at TCU	Fair Park Stadium; Dallas, TX (rivalry)	T 7–7		
October 17		Trinity (TX)*	Carroll Field; Waco, TX	L 3–10		
October 24		Howard Payne*	Cotton Palace; Waco, TX	W 20–4		
October 31		Texas A&M^{†}	Cotton Palace; Waco, TX (rivalry)	L 0–13		
November 7		at Texas	War Memorial Stadium; Austin, TX (rivalry)	L 3–13	10,000	
November 14		at SMU	Fair Park Stadium; Dallas, TX	L 6–7		
November 21		St. Edward's*	Cotton Palace; Waco, TX	W 13–7		
November 26		at Rice	Rice Field; Houston, TX	T 7–7	6,000	
*Non-conference game; ^{†}Homecoming; All times are in Central time
