= 1925 Southwest Texas State Bobcats football team =

American college football season

1925 Southwest Texas State Bobcats football
- Conference: Texas Intercollegiate Athletic Association
- Record: 2–6 (1–6 TIAA)
- Head coach: Oscar W. Strahan (7th season)
- Home stadium: Evans Field

1925 Texas Intercollegiate Athletic Association football standings
	Conf.					Overall
Team	W		L		T	W		L		T
Southwestern (TX) $	4	–	0	–	1	5	–	3	–	1
Simmons (TX)	6	–	1	–	0	7	–	2	–	0
Howard Payne	4	–	1	–	1	5	–	3	–	1
Trinity (TX)	4	–	2	–	0	9	–	3	–	0
North Texas State Teachers	4	–	2	–	0	6	–	4	–	0
Abilene Christian	2	–	1	–	1	2	–	5	–	2
Austin	2	–	3	–	0	4	–	4	–	1
Sam Houston State	1	–	2	–	0	5	–	4	–	0
East Texas State	2	–	4	–	0	2	–	8	–	0
West Texas State	1	–	3	–	0	4	–	4	–	0
St. Edward's	1	–	3	–	1	3	–	4	–	1
Southwest Texas State	1	–	6	–	0	2	–	6	–	0
Daniel Baker	0	–	4	–	2	2	–	6	–	2
$ – Conference champion

The 1925 Southwest Texas State Bobcats football team was an American football team that represented Southwest Texas State Teachers College (now known as Texas State University) during the 1925 college football season as a member of the Texas Intercollegiate Athletic Association (TIAA). In their seventh year under head coach Oscar W. Strahan, the team compiled an overall record of 2–6 with a mark of 1–6 in conference play.

== Schedule ==
Date	Opponent	Site	Result	Source
October 3	at Stephen F. Austin*	Nacogdoches, TX	W 12–0	
October 9	at Howard Payne	Brownwood, TX	L 12–28	
October 17	at East Texas State	Lion Field; Commerce, TX	L 0–7	
October 23	at Trinity (TX)	Yoakum Field; Waxahachie, TX	L 0–31	
November 6	St. Edward's	Evans Field; San Marcos, TX	W 18–6	
November 14	at Sam Houston State	Pritchett Field; Huntsville, TX (rivalry)	L 9–12	
November 19	North Texas State Teachers	Evans Field; San Marcos, TX	L 6–10	
November 26	Southwestern (TX)	Evans Field; San Marcos, TX	L 0–12	
*Non-conference game
