= 1925 Sam Houston State Bearkats football team =

American college football season

1925 Sam Houston State Bearkats football
- Conference: Texas Intercollegiate Athletic Association
- Record: 5–4 (1–2 TIAA)
- Head coach: J. W. Jones (3rd season)
- Home stadium: Pritchett Field

1925 Texas Intercollegiate Athletic Association football standings
	Conf.					Overall
Team	W		L		T	W		L		T
Southwestern (TX) $	4	–	0	–	1	5	–	3	–	1
Simmons (TX)	6	–	1	–	0	7	–	2	–	0
Howard Payne	4	–	1	–	1	5	–	3	–	1
Trinity (TX)	4	–	2	–	0	9	–	3	–	0
North Texas State Teachers	4	–	2	–	0	6	–	4	–	0
Abilene Christian	2	–	1	–	1	2	–	5	–	2
Austin	2	–	3	–	0	4	–	4	–	1
Sam Houston State	1	–	2	–	0	5	–	4	–	0
East Texas State	2	–	4	–	0	2	–	8	–	0
West Texas State	1	–	3	–	0	4	–	4	–	0
St. Edward's	1	–	3	–	1	3	–	4	–	1
Southwest Texas State	1	–	6	–	0	2	–	6	–	0
Daniel Baker	0	–	4	–	2	2	–	6	–	2
$ – Conference champion

The 1925 Sam Houston State Bearkats football team represented Sam Houston State Teachers College (now known as Sam Houston State University) as a member of the Texas Intercollegiate Athletic Association (TIAA) during the 1925 college football season. Led by third-year head coach J. W. Jones, the Bearkats compiled an overall record of 5–4 with a mark of 1–2 in conference play, and finished in eighth place in the TIAA.

== Schedule ==
Date	Opponent	Site	Result	Source
September 25	Westminster (TX)*	Pritchett Field; Huntsville, TX	W 7–0	
October 3	at Rice*	Rice Field; Houston, TX	L 0–7	
October 9	East Texas State	Pritchett Field; Huntsville, TX	L 0–7	
October 17	Southwestern Louisiana*	Pritchett Field; Huntsville, TX	W 7–2	
October 23	at Texas A&M*	Kyle Field; College Station, TX	L 0–77	
November 5	Rusk College*	Pritchett Field; Huntsville, TX	W 13–0	
November 14	Southwest Texas State	Pritchett Field; Huntsville, TX (rivalry)	W 12–9	
November 20	at Stephen F. Austin	Birdwell Field; Nacogdoches, TX (rivalry)	W 6–0	
November 26	at St. Edward's	Memorial Stadium; Austin, TX	L 6–46	
*Non-conference game
