= 1925 Trinity Tigers football team =

American football team that represented Trinity University

1925 Trinity Tigers football
- Conference: Texas Intercollegiate Athletic Association
- Record: 9–3 (4–2 TIAA)
- Head coach: Barry Holton (1st season)
- Home stadium: Yoakum Field

1925 Texas Intercollegiate Athletic Association football standings
	Conf.					Overall
Team	W		L		T	W		L		T
Southwestern (TX) $	4	–	0	–	1	5	–	3	–	1
Simmons (TX)	6	–	1	–	0	7	–	2	–	0
Howard Payne	4	–	1	–	1	5	–	3	–	1
Trinity (TX)	4	–	2	–	0	9	–	3	–	0
North Texas State Teachers	4	–	2	–	0	6	–	4	–	0
Abilene Christian	2	–	1	–	1	2	–	5	–	2
Austin	2	–	3	–	0	4	–	4	–	1
Sam Houston State	1	–	2	–	0	5	–	4	–	0
East Texas State	2	–	4	–	0	2	–	8	–	0
West Texas State	1	–	3	–	0	4	–	4	–	0
St. Edward's	1	–	3	–	1	3	–	4	–	1
Southwest Texas State	1	–	6	–	0	2	–	6	–	0
Daniel Baker	0	–	4	–	2	2	–	6	–	2
$ – Conference champion

The 1925 Trinity Tigers football team represented Trinity University as a member of the Texas Intercollegiate Athletic Association (TIAA) during the 1925 college football season. Led by Barry Holton in his first season as head coach, the team compiled an overall record of 9–3 with a mark of 4–2 in TIAA play, placing in three-way tie for fourth in the TIAA. Trinity played three games against Southwestern Conference opponents, defeating Rice and Baylor and losing to Texas A&M.

== Schedule ==
Date	Time	Opponent	Site	Result	Attendance	Source
September 19		Meridian*	Yoakum Field; Waxahachie, TX	W 9–0		
September 25		at Texas A&M*	Kyle Field; College Station, TX	L 10–20		
October 2		North Texas Agricultural*	Yoakum Field; Waxahachie, TX	W 55–0		
October 10		at Rice*	Rice Field; Houston, TX	W 13–0		
October 17		at Baylor*	Carroll Field; Waco, TX	W 10–3		
October 23		Southwest Texas State	Yoakum Field; Waxahachie, TX	W 31–0		
October 30	3:00 p.m.	at Austin	Cashion Field; Sherman, TX	W 16–0	2,500	
November 4		at Howard Payne	Brownwood, TX	W 6–0		
November 11		Simmons (TX)	Yoakum Field; Waxahachie, TX	L 7–9		
November 19		at Southwestern (TX)	Snyder Field; Georgetown, TX	L 0–3		
November 26		at North Texas State Teachers	Eagle Field; Denton, TX	W 16–6		
December 5		at Fort Sam Houston*	San Antonio, TX	W 27–3		
*Non-conference game; All times are in Central time
