= 1925 Rice Owls football team =

American college football season

1925 Rice Owls football
- Conference: Southwest Conference
- Record: 4–4–1 (1–2–1 SWC)
- Head coach: John Heisman (2nd season)
- Home stadium: Rice Field

1925 Southwest Conference football standings
	Conf.					Overall
Team	W		L		T	W		L		T
Texas A&M $	4	–	1	–	0	7	–	1	–	1
TCU	2	–	0	–	1	7	–	1	–	1
Texas	2	–	1	–	1	6	–	2	–	1
SMU	1	–	1	–	2	5	–	2	–	2
Rice	1	–	2	–	1	4	–	4	–	1
Arkansas	1	–	2	–	1	4	–	4	–	1
Baylor	0	–	3	–	2	3	–	5	–	2
$ – Conference champion

The 1925 Rice Owls football team was an American football team that represented Rice Institute in the Southwest Conference during the 1925 college football season. In its second season under head coach John Heisman, the team compiled a 4–4–1 record (1–2–1 against SWC opponents) and outscored opponents by a total of 85 to 79. The team played its home games at Rice Field in Houston.

== Schedule ==
Date	Opponent	Site	Result	Attendance	Source
September 26	Stephen F. Austin*	Rice Field; Houston, TX	W 33–0		
October 3	Sam Houston Normal*	Rice Field; Houston, TX	W 7–0		
October 10	Trinity (TX)*	Rice Field; Houston, TX	L 0–13		
October 17	Arkansas	Rice Field; Houston, TX	W 13–9		
October 24	at Texas	Memorial Stadium; Austin, TX (rivalry)	L 6–27		
October 31	Southwestern (TX)*	Rice Field; Houston, TX	W 19–0		
November 7	at LSU*	Tiger Stadium; Baton Rouge, LA	L 0–6		
November 14	Texas A&M	Rice Field; Houston, TX	L 0–17		
November 28	Baylor	Rice Field; Houston, TX	T 7–7	6,000	
*Non-conference game
