= 1925 Texas A&M Aggies football team =

American college football season

1925 Texas A&M Aggies football

SWC champion
- Conference: Southwest Conference
- Record: 7–1–1 (4–1 SWC)
- Head coach: Dana X. Bible (8th season)
- Home stadium: Kyle Field

1925 Southwest Conference football standings
	Conf.					Overall
Team	W		L		T	W		L		T
Texas A&M $	4	–	1	–	0	7	–	1	–	1
TCU	2	–	0	–	1	7	–	1	–	1
Texas	2	–	1	–	1	6	–	2	–	1
SMU	1	–	1	–	2	5	–	2	–	2
Rice	1	–	2	–	1	4	–	4	–	1
Arkansas	1	–	2	–	1	4	–	4	–	1
Baylor	0	–	3	–	2	3	–	5	–	2
$ – Conference champion

The 1925 Texas A&M Aggies football team represented the Agricultural and Mechanical College of Texas—now known as Texas A&M University—in the Southwest Conference (SWC) during the 1925 college football season. In its eighth season under head coach Dana X. Bible, the team compiled a 7–1–1 record (4–1 against SWC opponents), won the conference championship, shut out five opponents, and outscored all opponents by a total of 191 to 25.

== Schedule ==
Date	Opponent	Site	Result	Attendance	Source
September 25	Trinity (TX)*	Kyle Field; College Station, TX	W 20–10		
October 2	Southwestern (TX)*	Kyle Field; College Station, TX	W 23–6		
October 10	vs. Sewanee*	Fair Park Stadium; Dallas, TX	T 6–6		
October 16	SMU	Kyle Field; College Station, TX	W 7–0		
October 23	Sam Houston State*	Kyle Field; College Station, TX	W 77–0		
October 31	at Baylor	Carroll Field; Waco, TX (rivalry)	W 13–0		
November 7	at TCU	Clark Field; Ft. Worth, TX (rivalry)	L 0–3	6,000	
November 14	at Rice	Rice Field; Houston, TX	W 17–0		
November 26	Texas	Kyle Field; College Station, TX (rivalry)	W 28–0	25,000	
*Non-conference game
