= 1925 Arkansas Razorbacks football team =

American college football season

1925 Arkansas Razorbacks football
- Conference: Southwest Conference
- Record: 4–4–1 (1–2–1 SWC)
- Head coach: Francis Schmidt (4th season)
- Captain: Brad Scott
- Home stadium: The Hill

1925 Southwest Conference football standings
	Conf.					Overall
Team	W		L		T	W		L		T
Texas A&M $	4	–	1	–	0	7	–	1	–	1
TCU	2	–	0	–	1	7	–	1	–	1
Texas	2	–	1	–	1	6	–	2	–	1
SMU	1	–	1	–	2	5	–	2	–	2
Rice	1	–	2	–	1	4	–	4	–	1
Arkansas	1	–	2	–	1	4	–	4	–	1
Baylor	0	–	3	–	2	3	–	5	–	2
$ – Conference champion

The 1925 Arkansas Razorbacks football team was an American football team that represented the University of Arkansas in the Southwest Conference (SWC) during the 1925 college football season. In its fourth year under head coach Francis Schmidt, Arkansas compiled a 4–4–1 record (1–2–1 against SWC opponents), finished in fifth place in the SWC, and outscored opponents by a total of 95 to 62.

== Schedule ==
Date	Opponent	Site	Result	Attendance	Source
October 3	at Iowa*	Iowa Field; Iowa City, IA	L 0–26		
October 10	Oklahoma Baptist*	The Hill; Fayetteville, AR	L 0–6		
October 17	at Rice	Rice Field; Houston, TX	L 9–13		
October 24	Phillips*	The Hill; Fayetteville, AR	W 45–0		
October 31	vs. LSU*	State Fair Stadium; Shreveport, LA (rivalry)	W 12–0	8,000	
November 7	at SMU	Fair Park; Dallas, TX	T 0–0	4,000	
November 14	at TCU	Clark Field; Fort Worth, TX	L 0–3		
November 21	Oklahoma A&M^{†}	The Hill; Fayetteville, AR	W 9–7		
November 28	at Tulsa*	McNulty Park; Tulsa, OK	W 20–7		
*Non-conference game; ^{†}Homecoming

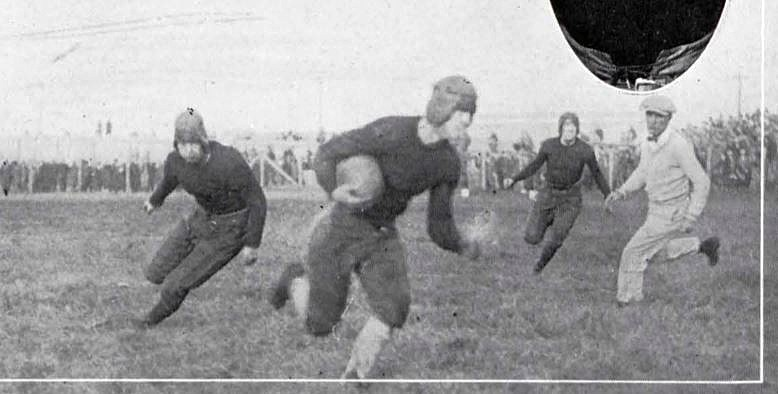
George Cole pictured running the ball against LSU
