= 1925 SMU Mustangs football team =

American college football season

1925 SMU Mustangs football

SWC champion
- Conference: Southwest Conference
- Record: 5–2–2 (1–1–2 SWC)
- Head coach: Ray Morrison (6th season)
- Captain: James Magness
- Home stadium: Fair Park Stadium

1925 Southwest Conference football standings
	Conf.					Overall
Team	W		L		T	W		L		T
Texas A&M $	4	–	1	–	0	7	–	1	–	1
TCU	2	–	0	–	1	7	–	1	–	1
Texas	2	–	1	–	1	6	–	2	–	1
SMU	1	–	1	–	2	5	–	2	–	2
Rice	1	–	2	–	1	4	–	4	–	1
Arkansas	1	–	2	–	1	4	–	4	–	1
Baylor	0	–	3	–	2	3	–	5	–	2
$ – Conference champion

The 1925 SMU Mustangs football team was an American football team that represented Southern Methodist University (SMU) as a member of the Southwest Conference (SWC) during the 1925 college football season. In its sixth season under head coach Ray Morrison, the team compiled a 5–2–2 record (1–1–2 against SWC opponents), finished fourth in the conference, and outscored opponents by a total of 148 to 41. James Magness was the team captain. The team played its home games at Fair Park Stadium in Dallas.

== Schedule ==
Date	Opponent	Site	Result	Attendance	Source
September 26	North Texas State Teachers*	Fair Park Stadium; Dallas, TX (rivalry)	W 48–0		
October 3	Abilene Christian*	Fair Park Stadium; Dallas, TX	W 52–7		
October 9	Washington University*	Fair Park Stadium; Dallas, TX	W 20–6		
October 16	at Texas A&M	Kyle Field; College Station, TX	L 0–7		
October 24	Oklahoma*	Fair Park Stadium; Dallas, TX	L 0–9		
October 31	Texas	Fair Park Stadium; Dallas, TX	T 0–0		
November 7	Arkansas	Fair Park Stadium; Dallas, TX	T 0–0	4,000	
November 14	Baylor	Fair Park Stadium; Dallas, TX	W 7–6		
November 26	Drake*	Fair Park Stadium; Dallas, TX	W 21–6		
*Non-conference game
