= 1925 TCU Horned Frogs football team =

American college football season

1925 TCU Horned Frogs football
- Conference: Southwest Conference
- Record: 7–1–1 (2–0–1 SWC)
- Head coach: Matty Bell (3rd season)
- Captain: Herman Clark
- Home stadium: Clark Field

1925 Southwest Conference football standings
	Conf.					Overall
Team	W		L		T	W		L		T
Texas A&M $	4	–	1	–	0	7	–	1	–	1
TCU	2	–	0	–	1	7	–	1	–	1
Texas	2	–	1	–	1	6	–	2	–	1
SMU	1	–	1	–	2	5	–	2	–	2
Rice	1	–	2	–	1	4	–	4	–	1
Arkansas	1	–	2	–	1	4	–	4	–	1
Baylor	0	–	3	–	2	3	–	5	–	2
$ – Conference champion

The 1925 TCU Horned Frogs football team was an American football team that represented Texas Christian University (TCU) as a member the Southwest Conference (SWC) during the 1925 college football season. In its third season under head coach Matty Bell, TCU compiled an overall record of 7–1–1 with a conference mark of 2–0–1 placing second. They shut out five of nine opponents, and outscored all opponents by a total of 133 to 54. TCU played its home games at Clark Field, located on campus in Fort Worth, Texas. The team's captain was Herman Clark, who played quarterback.

== Schedule ==
Date	Time	Opponent	Site	Result	Attendance	Source
September 26	3:00 p.m.	East Texas State*	Clark Field; Fort Worth, TX	W 31–0		
October 3	3:00 p.m.	Daniel Baker*	Clark Field; Fort Worth, TX	W 12–0		
October 13	3:00 p.m.	vs. Baylor	Fair Park Stadium; Dallas, TX (rivalry)	T 7–7		
October 17		Simmons (TX)*	Clark Field; Fort Worth, TX	W 28–16	4,000	
October 24		at Oklahoma A&M*	Lewis Field; Stillwater, OK	L 7–22		
October 31		Abilene Christian*	Clark Field; Fort Worth, TX	W 21–9		
November 7		Texas A&M	Clark Field; Fort Worth, TX (rivalry)	W 3–0	6,000	
November 14		Arkansas	Clark Field; Fort Worth, TX	W 3–0		
November 26		Austin*	Clark Field; Fort Worth, TX	W 21–0	3,000	
*Non-conference game; All times are in Central time
