= 1925 Texas Longhorns football team =

American college football season

1925 Texas Longhorns football
- Conference: Southwest Conference
- Record: 6–2–1 (2–1–1 SWC)
- Head coach: E. J. Stewart (3rd season)
- Captain: Stewart Wright
- Home stadium: War Memorial Stadium

1925 Southwest Conference football standings
	Conf.					Overall
Team	W		L		T	W		L		T
Texas A&M $	4	–	1	–	0	7	–	1	–	1
TCU	2	–	0	–	1	7	–	1	–	1
Texas	2	–	1	–	1	6	–	2	–	1
SMU	1	–	1	–	2	5	–	2	–	2
Rice	1	–	2	–	1	4	–	4	–	1
Arkansas	1	–	2	–	1	4	–	4	–	1
Baylor	0	–	3	–	2	3	–	5	–	2
$ – Conference champion

The 1925 Texas Longhorns football team was an American football team that represented the University of Texas in the Southwest Conference (SWC) during the 1925 college football season. In its third season under head coach E. J. Stewart, the team compiled a 6–2–1 record (2–1–1 against SWC opponents) and outscored opponents by a total of 157 to 51.

== Schedule ==
Date	Opponent	Site	Result	Attendance	Source
September 26	Southwestern (TX)*	War Memorial Stadium; Austin, TX	W 33–0		
October 3	Ole Miss*	War Memorial Stadium; Austin, TX	W 25–0		
October 10	at Vanderbilt*	Dudley Field; Nashville, TN	L 6–14		
October 17	vs. Auburn*	Fair Park Stadium; Dallas, TX	W 33–0		
October 24	Rice	War Memorial Stadium; Austin, TX (rivalry)	W 27–6		
October 31	at SMU	Armstrong Field; Dallas, TX	T 0–0		
November 7	Baylor	War Memorial Stadium; Austin, TX (rivalry)	W 13–3	10,000	
November 14	Arizona*	War Memorial Stadium; Austin, TX	W 20–0		
November 26	at Texas A&M	Kyle Field; College Station, TX (rivalry)	L 0–28	25,000	
*Non-conference game
