= 1925 Oklahoma A&M Cowboys football team =

American college football season

1925 Oklahoma A&M Cowboys football
- Conference: Missouri Valley Conference
- Record: 2–5–1 (0–3–1 MVC)
- Head coach: John Maulbetsch (5th season)
- Home stadium: Lewis Field

1925 Missouri Valley Conference football standings
| | Conf. | | | | | Overall |
| Team | W | | L | | T | W | | L | | T |
|---|---|---|---|---|---|---|---|---|---|---|
| No. 5 Missouri $ | 5 | – | 1 | – | 0 | 6 | – | 1 | – | 1 |
| Drake | 5 | – | 2 | – | 0 | 5 | – | 3 | – | 0 |
| Kansas State | 3 | – | 2 | – | 1 | 5 | – | 2 | – | 1 |
| Iowa State | 3 | – | 2 | – | 1 | 4 | – | 3 | – | 1 |
| Nebraska | 2 | – | 2 | – | 1 | 4 | – | 2 | – | 2 |
| Oklahoma | 3 | – | 3 | – | 1 | 4 | – | 3 | – | 1 |
| Grinnell | 2 | – | 2 | – | 1 | 3 | – | 3 | – | 2 |
| Kansas | 2 | – | 5 | – | 1 | 2 | – | 5 | – | 1 |
| Washington University | 1 | – | 4 | – | 1 | 2 | – | 5 | – | 1 |
| Oklahoma A&M | 0 | – | 3 | – | 1 | 2 | – | 5 | – | 1 |
$ – Conference champion; Rankings from Dickinson System

The 1925 Oklahoma A&M Cowboys football team was an American football team that represented Oklahoma A&M College (later renamed Oklahoma State University) as a member of the Missouri Valley Conference (MVC) during the 1925 college football season. In its fifth season under head coach John Maulbetsch, the team compiled a 2–5–1 record (0–3–1 against MVC opponents) and was outscored by a total of 115 to 41. The 1925 season was Oklahoma A&M's 25th competing in intercollegiate football and its first as a member of the MVC. The team played its home games at Lewis Field in Stillwater, Oklahoma.

== Schedule ==
| Date | Opponent | Site | Result | Attendance | Source |
|---|---|---|---|---|---|
| October 3 | at Kansas | Memorial Stadium; Lawrence, KS | L 3–13 | | |
| October 10 | Kansas State Teachers* | Lewis Field; Stillwater, OK | L 0–21 | | |
| October 17 | Washington University | Francis Field; St. Louis, MO | T 0–0 | | |
| October 24 | TCU* | Lewis Field; Stillwater, OK | W 22–7 | | |
| October 31 | Grinnell^{†} | Lewis Field; Stillwater, OK | L 0–28 | 7,000 | |
| November 7 | Southwestern State Teachers* | Lewis Field; Stillwater, OK | W 9–2 | | |
| November 21 | at Arkansas* | The Hill; Fayetteville, AR | L 7–9 | | |
| November 26 | at Oklahoma | Memorial Stadium; Norman, OK (rivalry) | L 0–35 | | |
*Non-conference game; ^{†}Homecoming
