= 1925 Drake Bulldogs football team =

American college football season

1925 Drake Bulldogs football
- Conference: Missouri Valley Conference
- Record: 5–3 (5–2 MVC)
- Head coach: Ossie Solem (5th season)
- Home stadium: Drake Stadium

1925 Missouri Valley Conference football standings
	Conf.					Overall
Team	W		L		T	W		L		T
No. 5 Missouri $	5	–	1	–	0	6	–	1	–	1
Drake	5	–	2	–	0	5	–	3	–	0
Kansas State	3	–	2	–	1	5	–	2	–	1
Iowa State	3	–	2	–	1	4	–	3	–	1
Nebraska	2	–	2	–	1	4	–	2	–	2
Oklahoma	3	–	3	–	1	4	–	3	–	1
Grinnell	2	–	2	–	1	3	–	3	–	2
Kansas	2	–	5	–	1	2	–	5	–	1
Washington University	1	–	4	–	1	2	–	5	–	1
Oklahoma A&M	0	–	3	–	1	2	–	5	–	1
$ – Conference champion; Rankings from Dickinson System

The 1925 Drake Bulldogs football team was an American football team that represented Drake University as a member of the Missouri Valley Conference (MVC) during the 1925 college football season. In its fifth season under head coach Ossie Solem, the team compiled a 5–3 record, placed second in the MVC, shut out four of eight opponents, and outscored its opponents by a total of 64 to 41.

On October 10, 1925, the team played its home opener at the newly-constructed Drake Stadium in Des Moines, Iowa. The stadium opened with seating for 18,000 spectators and was built at a cost of approximately $230,000. Drake shut out Kansas State (19–0) and Nebraska (14–0) in the first two games played at the new stadium.

== Schedule ==
Date	Opponent	Site	Result	Attendance	Source
October 3	at Washington University	Francis Field; St. Louis, MO	W 5–0	4,500	
October 10	Kansas State	Drake Stadium; Des Moines, IA	W 19–0	7,000	
October 17	at Oklahoma	Memorial Stadium; Norman, OK	L 0–7		
October 24	at Grinnell	Grinnell, IA	W 7–6		
October 31	at Kansas	Memorial Stadium; Lawrence, KS	W 7–0		
November 7	Nebraska	Drake Stadium; Des Moines, IA	W 14–0		
November 21	Iowa State	Drake Stadium; Des Moines, IA	L 6–7		
November 26	at SMU*	Fair Park Stadium; Dallas, TX	L 6–21		
*Non-conference game
