= 1925 Nebraska Cornhuskers football team =

American college football season

1925 Nebraska Cornhuskers football
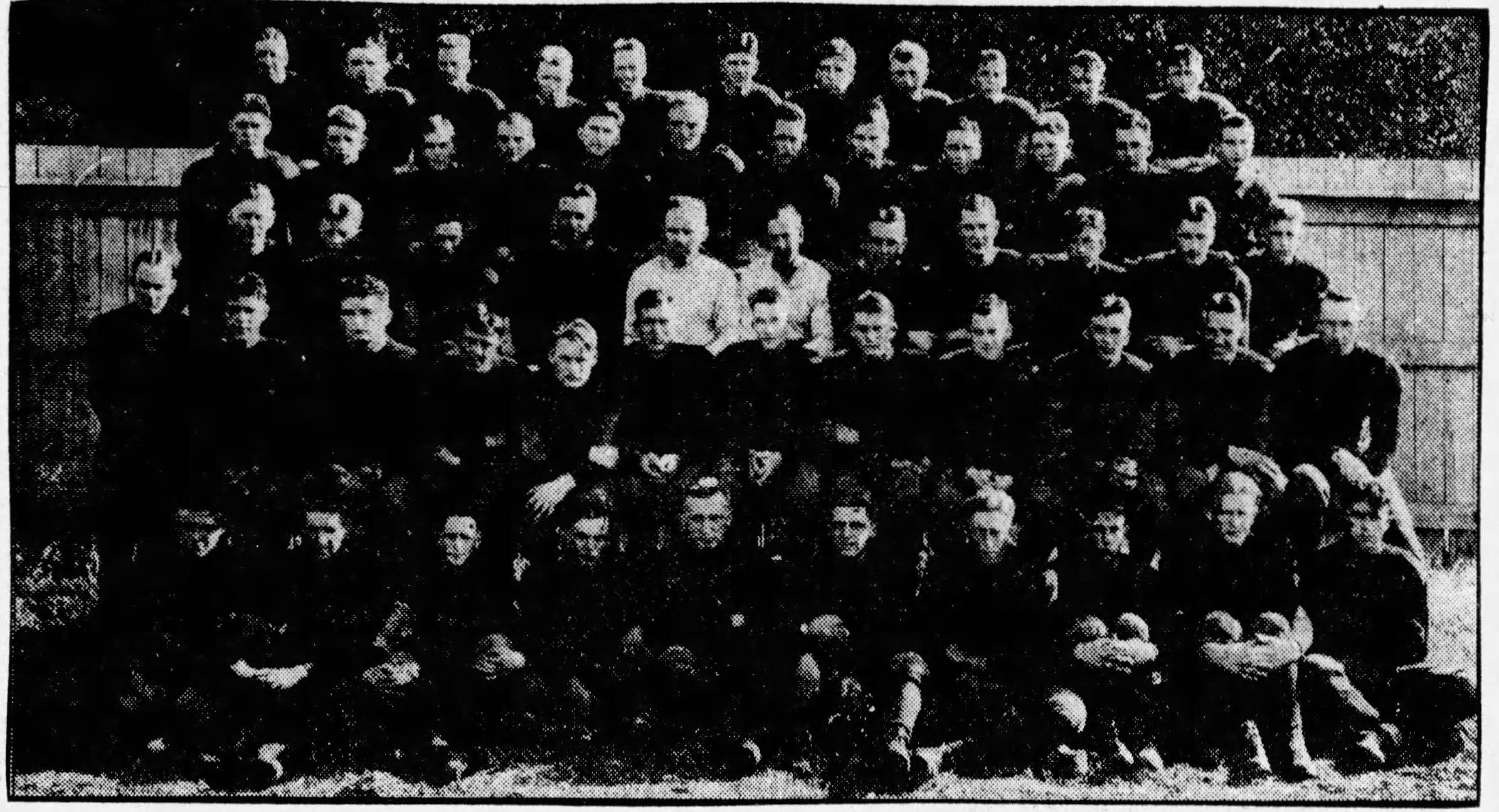
- Conference: Missouri Valley Conference
- Record: 4–2–2 (2–2–1 MVC)
- Head coach: Ernest Bearg (1st season)
- Captain: Ed Weir
- Home stadium: Memorial Stadium

1925 Missouri Valley Conference football standings
	Conf.					Overall
Team	W		L		T	W		L		T
No. 5 Missouri $	5	–	1	–	0	6	–	1	–	1
Drake	5	–	2	–	0	5	–	3	–	0
Kansas State	3	–	2	–	1	5	–	2	–	1
Iowa State	3	–	2	–	1	4	–	3	–	1
Nebraska	2	–	2	–	1	4	–	2	–	2
Oklahoma	3	–	3	–	1	4	–	3	–	1
Grinnell	2	–	2	–	1	3	–	3	–	2
Kansas	2	–	5	–	1	2	–	5	–	1
Washington University	1	–	4	–	1	2	–	5	–	1
Oklahoma A&M	0	–	3	–	1	2	–	5	–	1
$ – Conference champion; Rankings from Dickinson System

The 1925 Nebraska Cornhuskers football team was an American football team that represented the University of Nebraska in the Missouri Valley Conference (MVC) during the 1925 college football season. In its first season under head coach Ernest Bearg, the team compiled a 4–2–2 record (2–2–1 against conference opponents), finished fifth in the MVC, and outscored opponents by a total of 69 to 29. The team played its home games at Memorial Stadium in Lincoln, Nebraska.

Bearg was hired as Nebraska's head coach in January 1925. He had been the first assistant coach to Robert Zuppke at the University of Illinois and was unanimously endorsed by Nebraska's Athletic Board of Control.

== Schedule ==
Date	Time	Opponent	Site	Result	Attendance	Source
October 3	2:00 p.m.	at Illinois*	Memorial Stadium; Champaign, IL	W 14–0	40,000	
October 10	2:00 p.m.	at Missouri	Rollins Field; Columbia, MO (rivalry)	L 6–9		
October 17	2:00 p.m.	Washington*	Memorial Stadium; Lincoln, NE	T 6–6	15,000	
October 24	2:00 p.m.	Kansas^{†}	Memorial Stadium; Lincoln, NE (rivalry)	W 14–0	10,000	
October 31	2:00 p.m.	Oklahoma	Memorial Stadium; Lincoln, NE (rivalry)	W 12–0		
November 7	2:00 p.m.	at Drake	Drake Stadium; Des Moines, IA	L 0–12		
November 14	2:00 p.m.	at Kansas State	Memorial Stadium; Manhattan, KS (rivalry)	T 0–0	8,500	
November 26	2:00 p.m.	Notre Dame*	Memorial Stadium; Lincoln, NE (rivalry)	W 17–0	41,000	
*Non-conference game; ^{†}Homecoming; All times are in Central time

== Roster ==
Andreson, Roy E Brown, John QB; Casey L Dailey, Frank FB; Dover, Willard E DuTeau G Gillan E Hecht FB; Hutchinson, Harold C Kriemelmeyer, Walter G Lawson, Vinton E Lee, Evard E Leight E Locke, Roland HB; Mandery, Avard HB; Mandery, Roy T McIntyre E Mielenz, Frank HB	Molzen, Cecil G Oehlrich, Arnold HB; Pospisil, Frank G Presnell, Glenn HB; Raish, Clarence LG; Randels, Ray T Rhodes, John HB; Rock T Scholz, Walter RG; Shaner, George E Sprague, Leon E Stephens, Robert QB; Stiner, Lonnie T Weir, Ed T Weir, Joe E Wickman HB; Wostoupel, Joseph C

== Coaching staff ==
Coach	Position	First year	Alma mater
Ernest Bearg	Head coach	1925	Washburn
Owen Frank	Backfield coach	1921	Nebraska
Leo Sherer	Ends coach	1923	Nebraska
Bill Day	Centers coach	1921	Nebraska
Raymond Weller		1925	Nebraska

== Game summaries ==
=== Illinois ===
Nebraska at Illinois

Team	1	2	3	4	Total
• Nebraska	7	0	0	7	14
Illinois	0	0	0	0	0

- Date: October 3
- Location: Memorial Stadium • Champaign, Illinois
- Game weather: Rain
- Referee: Eckersall

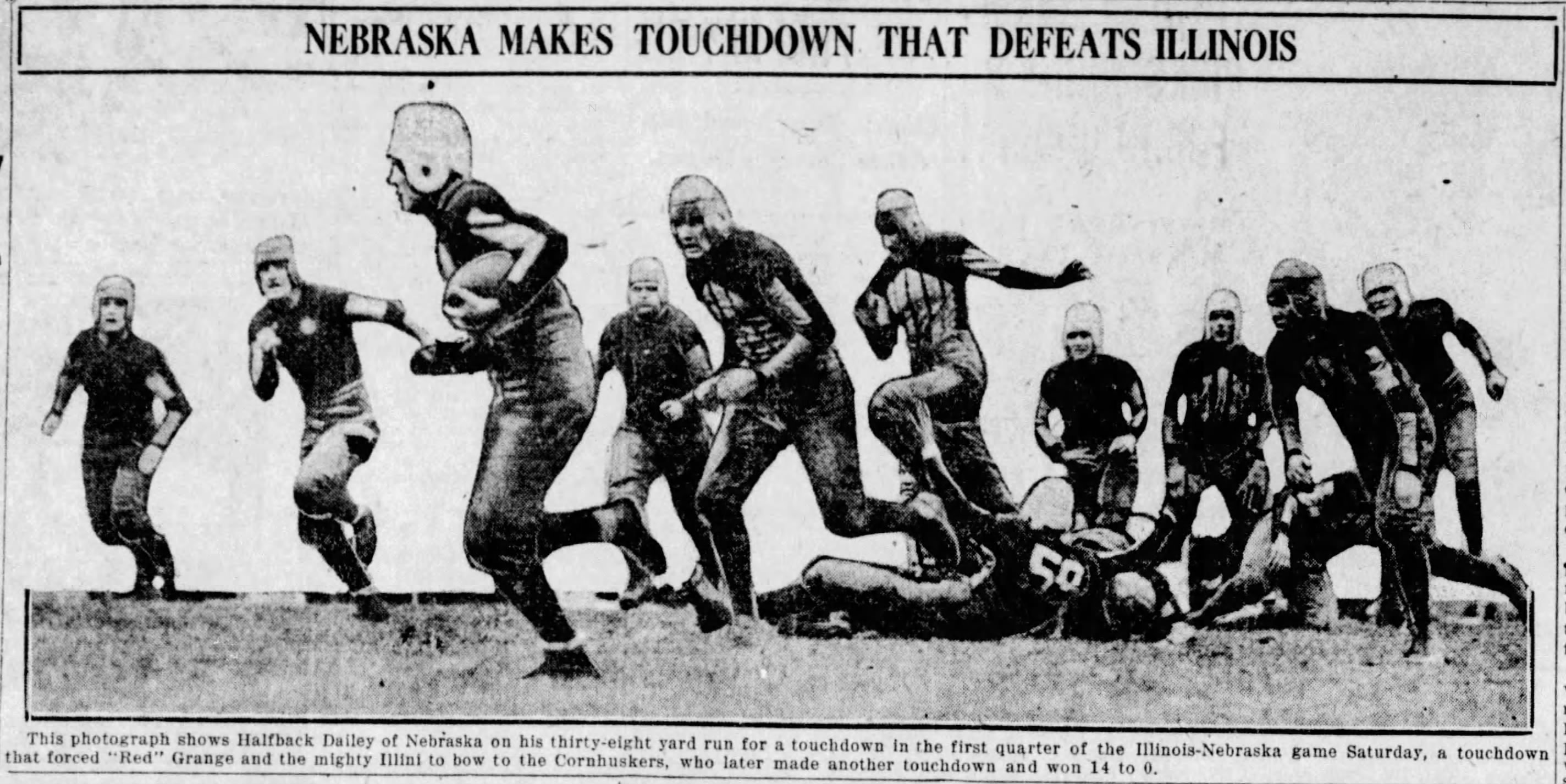
Frank Dailey on a run that would result in Nebraska's first touchdown of the game.

Coach Bearg's inaugural game was a smashing success, as Nebraska once again opened the season with an up-front challenge against powerhouse Illinois, twice the victor in the last two meetings of these teams. Cornhusker tackle Ed Weir was more than a match for Fighting Illini QB Red Grange, shutting him and the Illinois squad down like no one ever had before, and keeping Grange from scoring a rushing touchdown for the first of just two times in his college career. Nebraska ended the short two-game winning streak held by Illinois and improved in the series to 5–2.

=== Missouri ===
Nebraska at Missouri

Team	1	2	3	4	Total
Nebraska	6	0	0	0	6
• Missouri	0	0	9	0	9

- Date: October 10
- Location: Rollins Field • Columbia, Missouri

Nebraska traveled to meet reigning conference champion Missouri, upbeat and confident following the strong showing against Illinois. The Tigers, however, were not going to be brushed aside. Miscues and a back-breaking fumble late in the game cost the Cornhuskers, and sealed Missouri's victory. Nebraska's consolation after the fact was that they still held a commanding 14–4–1 lead in the series.

=== Washington ===
Washington at Nebraska

Team	1	2	Total
Washington			6
Nebraska			6

- Date: October 17
- Location: Memorial Stadium • Lincoln, Nebraska

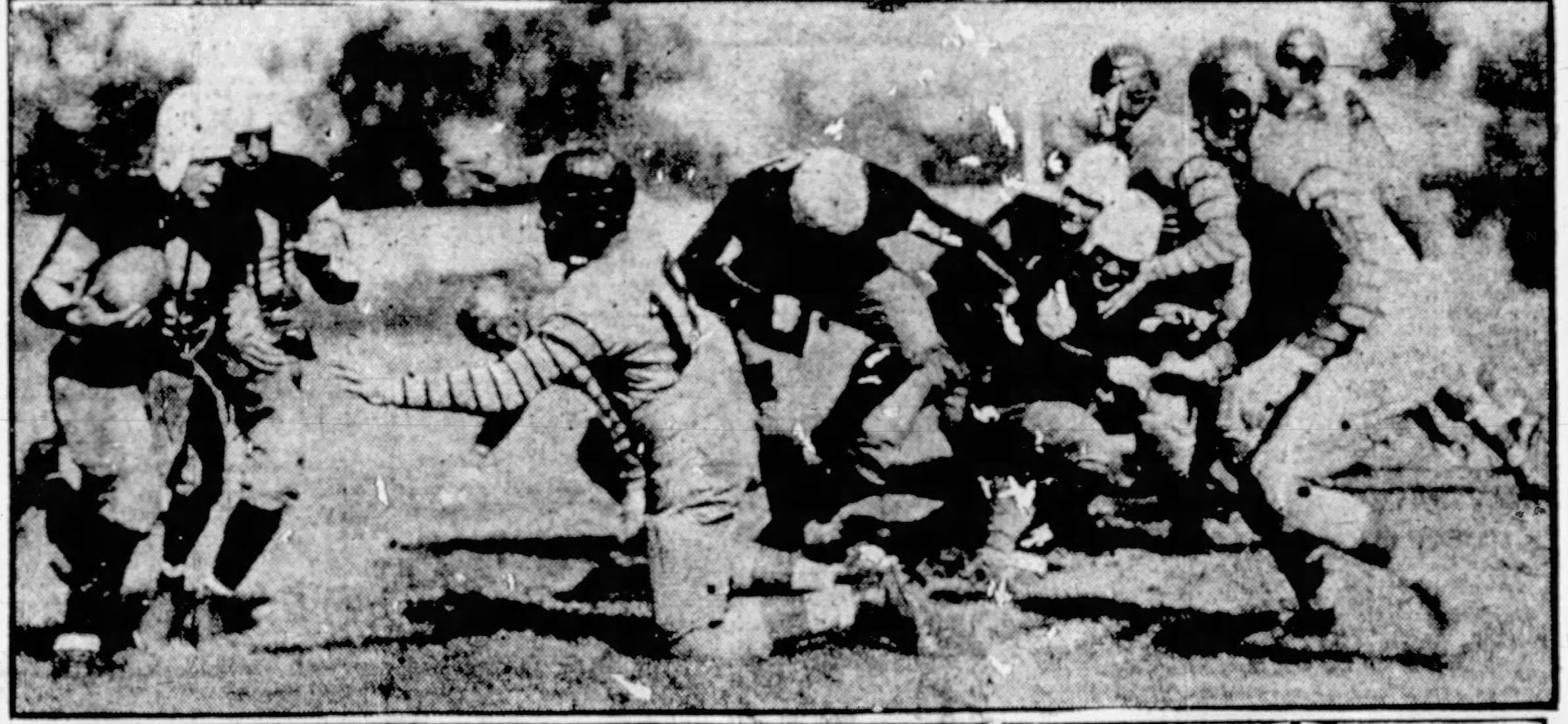
Frank Dailey running the ball with John Brown helping him vs. Washington

Nebraska hosted the Washington Huskies in the first meeting of these teams, and the hard fought game resulted in few points for either side. Although Washington held the early lead, Nebraska was able to stop their push and finally matched their points in the fourth quarter before the final whistle. Washington began the long journey home as both teams looked to next season's game, to be held in Seattle, to settle affairs.

=== Kansas ===
Kansas at Nebraska

Team	1	2	Total
Kansas			0
• Nebraska			14

- Date: October 24
- Location: Memorial Stadium • Lincoln, Nebraska

Kansas traveled to Nebraska hoping to chip away at the big series lead held by the Cornhuskers, and were initially successful in shutting down Nebraska as both teams were held off the scoreboard throughout the first half. The Cornhuskers were finally able to break down the Jayhawks and put up a touchdown in the third quarter, and eventually scoring again to seal the game and hand Kansas a shutout and another disappointing outcome. Nebraska's lead in the series was extended to 21–9–2.

=== Oklahoma ===
Oklahoma at Nebraska

Team	1	2	Total
Oklahoma			0
• Nebraska			12

- Date: October 31
- Location: Memorial Stadium • Lincoln, Nebraska

When the Sooners came to Lincoln, last year's surprise defeat to Oklahoma was on the minds of the Nebraska squad, as it had been the first time in all six games between these teams that Nebraska was sent away as the loser. The Cornhuskers came out in dominating fashion, stopping Oklahoma's attempts to advance at every turn and notching their second straight shutout win in the process. This was the 200th all-time win for the Nebraska Cornhuskers football team, and advanced their record over the Sooners to 5–1–1.

=== Drake ===
Nebraska at Drake

Team	1	2	3	4	Total
Nebraska	0	0	0	0	0
• Drake	6	0	0	6	12

- Date: November 7
- Location: Drake Stadium • Des Moines, Iowa
- Game weather: Heavy snow

After an eight-year break, the series with Drake was resumed when the Cornhuskers traveled to Des Moines to play in the new Drake Stadium for its dedication event. The Bulldogs were no longer to be overlooked as a pushover team, as they had finished second or third place in the previous three years in conference play. Heavy snow moved in, creating difficult conditions for both teams. Although Nebraska gained more yards and obtained more first downs, it was Drake who took advantage of multiple Cornhusker fumbles and twice found the end zone. Nebraska's two-game shutout win streak was snapped when they were themselves shut out, for their second loss in the seven contests between the teams.

=== Kansas State ===
Nebraska at Kansas State

Team	1	2	Total
Nebraska			0
Kansas State			0

- Date: November 14
- Location: Memorial Stadium • Manhattan, Kansas
- Game weather: Rain

Kansas State and Nebraska fought an evenly matched game, with neither squad able to find the end zone as the line was moved back and forth on the sloppy, wet field. Finally, as each team's defense figured the other out, the game ended with a series of back and forth punts in the fourth quarter when neither team could even get first downs, and the final whistle sounded with no points scored on the day. The Aggies won a small victory for their efforts, however, as this was the first time in all ten games they had played with Nebraska that they had not lost, though they had a long way to go to catch up with Nebraska's 9–0–1 series lead.

=== Notre Dame ===
Notre Dame at Nebraska

Team	1	2	3	4	Total
Notre Dame	0	0	0	0	0
• Nebraska	14	0	3	0	17

- Date: November 26
- Location: Memorial Stadium • Lincoln, Nebraska
- Game attendance: 45,000

Notre Dame was a force to be reckoned with for sure, coming to Lincoln with a 6–1–1 season record (five of the wins by shutout), and in position to claim the western title. However, the Four Horsemen had graduated, and even considering their success on the season so far, the Fighting Irish team of 1925 was not its former self. Memorial Stadium was designed to host 38,000 fans, but 45,000 were in the stadium for this game. Nebraska struck first and decisively, jumping right out to a 14–0 lead in the first quarter before the shocked Irish were able to adjust and stop further scoring attempts in the half. Nebraska's brutal plan for an onslaught of running attacks proved effective, as Notre Dame's roster was exhausted of fresh players able to keep up. In the third quarter, the Cornhuskers managed to score again on a field goal, and the crowd was sent again into loud celebrations. No one scored again, and the Irish were sent home with a bitter shutout defeat made all the worse for the harsh anti-Catholic treatment many of the Nebraska locals rained down on the team and their fans. Knute Rockne himself wrote harshly-worded responses to many of the area papers in response to the indignities suffered by the Irish off the field. As a result of those events, and also in part due to reductions in the income gained by Notre Dame on their trips to Lincoln, the Athletic Board at Notre Dame chose to end the series. Rockne himself felt that this was an overreaction and argued to continue the series, but the decision stood and the 1926 game was canceled, and communications between the schools regarding future games was terminated. Rockne made several unsuccessful attempts in the following years to revive the series, but it would be 22 years before the teams would meet again, leaving the record fittingly tied for now at 5–5–1.

== After the season ==
Coach Bearg finished his first season no worse than his predecessor's last season, but had won impressive victories against Notre Dame and Illinois in the process, and also shepherded the Cornhuskers through the program's 200th win. His first year record was 4–2–2 (.625), causing a slight drop in the program's overall record, to 201–69–19 (.728), while the conference record to date slipped to 40–6–5 (.833).
