= 1925 Iowa State Cyclones football team =

American college football season

1925 Iowa State Cyclones football
- Conference: Missouri Valley Conference
- Record: 4–3–1 (3–2–1 MVC)
- Head coach: Sam Willaman (4th season)
- Captain: Johnny Behm
- Home stadium: State Field

1925 Missouri Valley Conference football standings
	Conf.					Overall
Team	W		L		T	W		L		T
No. 5 Missouri $	5	–	1	–	0	6	–	1	–	1
Drake	5	–	2	–	0	5	–	3	–	0
Kansas State	3	–	2	–	1	5	–	2	–	1
Iowa State	3	–	2	–	1	4	–	3	–	1
Nebraska	2	–	2	–	1	4	–	2	–	2
Oklahoma	3	–	3	–	1	4	–	3	–	1
Grinnell	2	–	2	–	1	3	–	3	–	2
Kansas	2	–	5	–	1	2	–	5	–	1
Washington University	1	–	4	–	1	2	–	5	–	1
Oklahoma A&M	0	–	3	–	1	2	–	5	–	1
$ – Conference champion; Rankings from Dickinson System

The 1925 Iowa State Cyclones football team was an American football team that represented Iowa State College of Agricultural and Mechanic Arts (later renamed Iowa State University) in the Missouri Valley Conference (MVC) during the 1925 college football season. In its fourth and final season under head coach Sam Willaman, the team compiled a 4–3–1 record (3–2–1 against MVC opponents), tied for third place in the conference, and outscored opponents by a total of 107 to 93.

On October 10, 1925, Iowa State dedicated its new football stadium, State Field, in Ames, Iowa. The Cyclones defeated the Kansas Jayhawks by a 20 to 0 score in the dedication game.

Johnny Behm was the team captain. Lincoln Cory was selected as a first-team all-conference player.

== Schedule ==
Date	Time	Opponent	Site	Result	Attendance	Source
September 26	2:30 pm	Simpson*	State Field; Ames, IA	W 28–0	6,000	
October 3	2:30 pm	at Wisconsin*	Camp Randall Stadium; Madison, WI	L 0–30	10,000	
October 10	2:30 pm	Kansas	State Field; Ames, IA	W 20–0	6,000	
October 24	2:30 pm	Washington University	State Field; Ames, IA	W 28–13	5,000	
October 31	2:30 pm	at Missouri	Rollins Field; Columbia, MO (rivalry)	L 8–23	7,000	
November 7	2:00 pm	Grinnell^{†}	State Field; Ames, IA	T 9–9		
November 21	2:00 pm	at Drake	Drake Stadium; Des Moines, IA	W 7–6		
November 26	11:00 am	Kansas State	State Field; Ames, IA (rivalry)	L 7–12	6,500	
*Non-conference game; ^{†}Homecoming; All times are in Central time

== Roster ==
1925 Iowa State Cyclones football roster
- 1 Johnny Behm - Quarterback (C)
- 5 Sielaff
- 5 Bob Fisher - Halfback
- 10 Hamilton
- 12 J. Ayres
- 15 R. Ewalt
- 17 E. J. Anderson
- 18 C. Ayres
- 19 Meyers
- 21 Hienton
- 23 Wallace
- 24 Burt Fayram
- 27 Winget
- 28 Sulzbach
- 40 Krekow
- 41 Crawford
- 42 Crooks
- 46 Brockmeyer
- 50 John Rasmess - Guard
- 56 Norton Behm - Halfback
- 57 Bond - End
- 59 Bob Fisher
- 61 Ed Hill
- 64 Lynn Grimes
- 65 Woodhull
- 66 Walter Weiss
- 68 Zellers
- 69 Al Thornburg - Center
- 70 Ray Galbraith - Guard
- 72 Frank Mayer - Tackle
- 75 E. A. Anderson
- 77 Norm Thomas - Guard
- 78 Elmer Kingery - Tackle
- 80 Lincoln Cory - Fullback
- 81 Charles K. Hill - Fullback
- 84 Vernon Hall - Halfback
- 85 Bud Coe - End
