= 1925 Missouri Tigers football team =

American college football season

1925 Missouri Tigers football

MVC champion
- Conference: Missouri Valley Conference
- Record: 6–1–1 (5–1 MVC)
- Head coach: Gwinn Henry (3rd season)
- Captain: Sam Whiteman
- Home stadium: Rollins Field

1925 Missouri Valley Conference football standings
	Conf.					Overall
Team	W		L		T	W		L		T
No. 5 Missouri $	5	–	1	–	0	6	–	1	–	1
Drake	5	–	2	–	0	5	–	3	–	0
Kansas State	3	–	2	–	1	5	–	2	–	1
Iowa State	3	–	2	–	1	4	–	3	–	1
Nebraska	2	–	2	–	1	4	–	2	–	2
Oklahoma	3	–	3	–	1	4	–	3	–	1
Grinnell	2	–	2	–	1	3	–	3	–	2
Kansas	2	–	5	–	1	2	–	5	–	1
Washington University	1	–	4	–	1	2	–	5	–	1
Oklahoma A&M	0	–	3	–	1	2	–	5	–	1
$ – Conference champion; Rankings from Dickinson System

The 1925 Missouri Tigers football team was an American football team that represented the University of Missouri in the Missouri Valley Conference (MVC) during the 1925 college football season. The team compiled a 6–1–1 record (5–1 against Missouri Valley opponents), won the Missouri Valley championship, and outscored all opponents by a combined total of 110 to 44. The team was ranked No. 5 in the nation in the Dickinson System ratings released in January 1926. Gwinn Henry was the head coach for the third of nine seasons.

This was the final season for the team playing its home games at Rollins Field in Columbia, Missouri, before moving to Memorial Stadium the following season.

== Schedule ==
Date	Opponent	Site	Result	Attendance	Source
October 3	at Tulane*	Tulane Stadium; New Orleans, LA	T 6–6	8,500	
October 10	Nebraska	Rollins Field; Columbia, MO (rivalry)	W 9–6		
October 17	Missouri Mines*	Rollins Field; Columbia, MO	W 32–0		
October 24	at Kansas State	Memorial Stadium; Manhattan, KS	W 3–0		
October 31	Iowa State	Rollins Field; Columbia, MO (rivalry)	W 23–8	7,000	
November 7	at Washington University	Francis Field; St. Louis, MO	W 14–0		
November 14	Oklahoma^{†}	Rollins Field; Columbia, MO (rivalry)	W 16–14	10,000	
November 21	at Kansas	Memorial Stadium; Lawrence, KS (rivalry)	L 7–10	> 30,000	
*Non-conference game; ^{†}Homecoming
