= 1925 Kansas State Wildcats football team =

American college football season

1925 Kansas State Wildcats football
- Conference: Missouri Valley Conference
- Record: 5–2–1 (3–2–1 MVC)
- Head coach: Charlie Bachman (6th season)
- Offensive scheme: Notre Dame Box
- Home stadium: Memorial Stadium

1925 Missouri Valley Conference football standings
| | Conf. | | | | | Overall |
| Team | W | | L | | T | W | | L | | T |
|---|---|---|---|---|---|---|---|---|---|---|
| No. 5 Missouri $ | 5 | – | 1 | – | 0 | 6 | – | 1 | – | 1 |
| Drake | 5 | – | 2 | – | 0 | 5 | – | 3 | – | 0 |
| Kansas State | 3 | – | 2 | – | 1 | 5 | – | 2 | – | 1 |
| Iowa State | 3 | – | 2 | – | 1 | 4 | – | 3 | – | 1 |
| Nebraska | 2 | – | 2 | – | 1 | 4 | – | 2 | – | 2 |
| Oklahoma | 3 | – | 3 | – | 1 | 4 | – | 3 | – | 1 |
| Grinnell | 2 | – | 2 | – | 1 | 3 | – | 3 | – | 2 |
| Kansas | 2 | – | 5 | – | 1 | 2 | – | 5 | – | 1 |
| Washington University | 1 | – | 4 | – | 1 | 2 | – | 5 | – | 1 |
| Oklahoma A&M | 0 | – | 3 | – | 1 | 2 | – | 5 | – | 1 |
$ – Conference champion; Rankings from Dickinson System

The 1925 Kansas State Wildcats football team was an American football team that represented Kansas State Agricultural College as a member of the Missouri Valley Conference (MVC) during the 1925 college football season. In its sixth season under head coach Charlie Bachman, the Aggies compiled a 5–2–1 record (3–2–1 against conference opponents), tied for third in the conference, and outscored opponents by a total of 70 to 43.

== Schedule ==
| Date | Opponent | Site | Result | Attendance | Source |
|---|---|---|---|---|---|
| September 26 | Kansas State Teachers* | Memorial Stadium; Manhattan, KS | W 26–7 | | |
| October 3 | Oklahoma | Memorial Stadium; Manhattan, KS | W 16–0 | | |
| October 10 | at Drake | Drake Stadium; Des Moines, IA | L 0–19 | 7,000 | |
| October 17 | at Kansas | Memorial Stadium; Lawrence, KS (rivalry) | W 14–7 | 12,000 | |
| October 24 | Missouri | Memorial Stadium; Manhattan, KS | L 0–3 | | |
| November 7 | at Marquette* | Marquette Stadium; Milwaukee, WI | W 2–0 | | |
| November 14 | Nebraska^{†} | Memorial Stadium; Manhattan, KS (rivalry) | T 0–0 | 8,500 | |
| November 26 | at Iowa State | State Field; Ames, IA (rivalry) | W 12–7 | 6,500 | |
*Non-conference game; ^{†}Homecoming
