= 1925 Kansas Jayhawks football team =

American college football season

1925 Kansas Jayhawks football
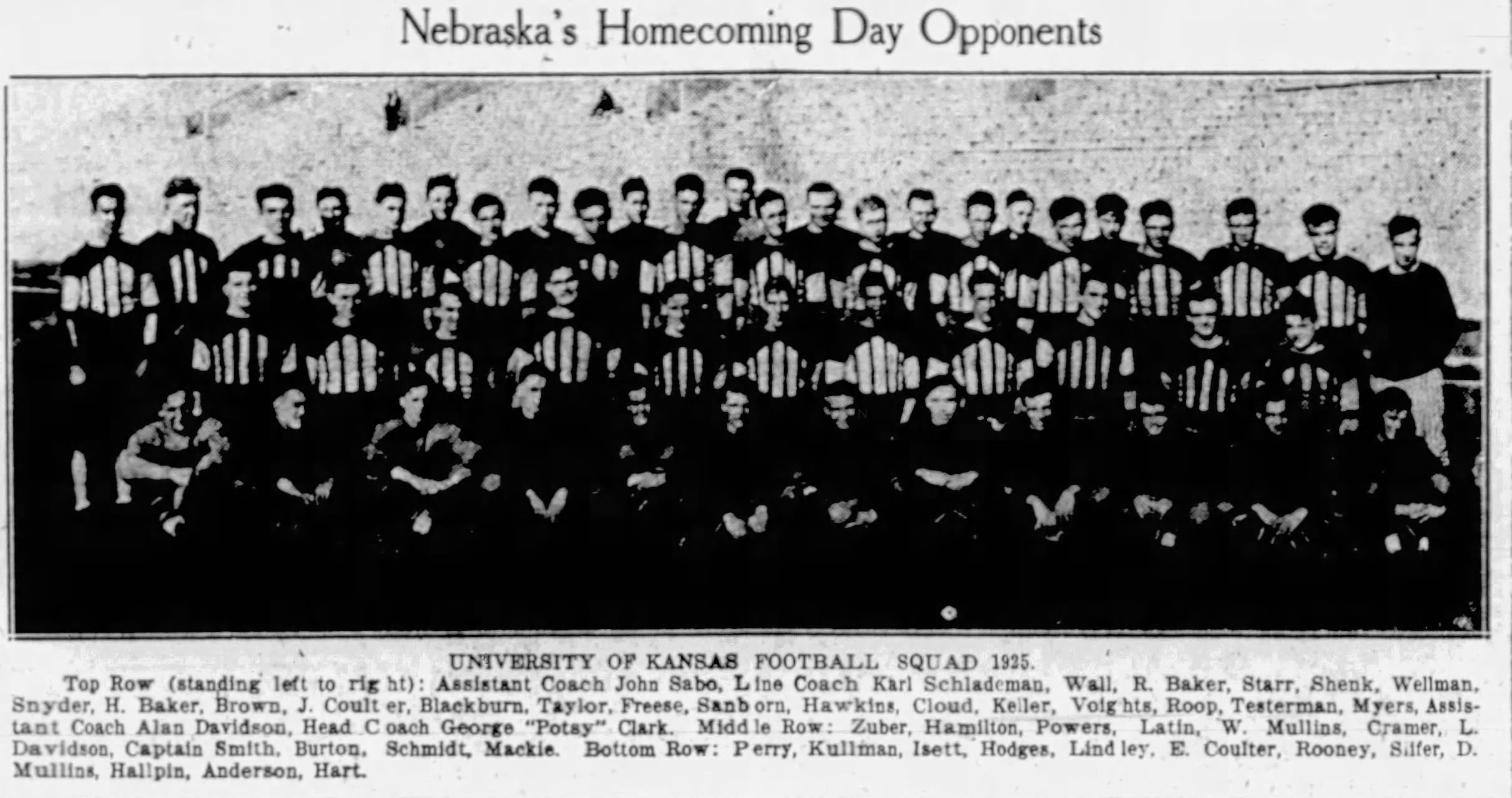
- Conference: Missouri Valley Conference
- Record: 2–5–1 (2–5–1 MVC)
- Head coach: Potsy Clark (5th season)
- Captain: Reginald Smith
- Home stadium: Memorial Stadium

1925 Missouri Valley Conference football standings
	Conf.					Overall
Team	W		L		T	W		L		T
No. 5 Missouri $	5	–	1	–	0	6	–	1	–	1
Drake	5	–	2	–	0	5	–	3	–	0
Kansas State	3	–	2	–	1	5	–	2	–	1
Iowa State	3	–	2	–	1	4	–	3	–	1
Nebraska	2	–	2	–	1	4	–	2	–	2
Oklahoma	3	–	3	–	1	4	–	3	–	1
Grinnell	2	–	2	–	1	3	–	3	–	2
Kansas	2	–	5	–	1	2	–	5	–	1
Washington University	1	–	4	–	1	2	–	5	–	1
Oklahoma A&M	0	–	3	–	1	2	–	5	–	1
$ – Conference champion; Rankings from Dickinson System

The 1925 Kansas Jayhawks football team was an American football team that represented the University of Kansas in the Missouri Valley Conference during the 1925 college football season. In its fifth and final season under head coach Potsy Clark, the team compiled a 2–5–1 record (2–5–1 against conference opponents), finished in eighth place in the conference, and was outscored by a total of 68 to 30. They played their home games at Memorial Stadium in Lawrence, Kansas. Reginald Smith was the team captain.

== Schedule ==
Date	Opponent	Site	Result	Attendance	Source
October 3	Oklahoma A&M	Memorial Stadium; Lawrence, KS	W 13–3		
October 10	at Iowa State	State Field; Ames, IA	L 0–20	6,000	
October 17	Kansas State	Memorial Stadium; Lawrence, KS (Sunflower Showdown)	L 7–14	12,000	
October 24	at Nebraska	Memorial Stadium; Lincoln, NE (rivalry)	L 0–14	10,000	
October 31	Drake	Memorial Stadium; Lawrence, KS	L 0–7		
November 7	at Oklahoma	Oklahoma Memorial Stadium; Norman, OK	T 0–0	~ 10,000	
November 14	at Grinnell	Grinnell, IA	L 0–3		
November 21	Missouri^{†}	Memorial Stadium; Lawrence, KS (Border War)	W 10–7	> 30,000	
^{†}Homecoming
