= 1925 Washington University Pikers football team =

American college football season

1925 Washington University Pikers football
- Conference: Missouri Valley Conference
- Record: 2–5–1 (1–4–1 MVC)
- Head coach: Bob Higgins (1st season)
- Home stadium: Francis Field

1925 Missouri Valley Conference football standings
	Conf.					Overall
Team	W		L		T	W		L		T
No. 5 Missouri $	5	–	1	–	0	6	–	1	–	1
Drake	5	–	2	–	0	5	–	3	–	0
Kansas State	3	–	2	–	1	5	–	2	–	1
Iowa State	3	–	2	–	1	4	–	3	–	1
Nebraska	2	–	2	–	1	4	–	2	–	2
Oklahoma	3	–	3	–	1	4	–	3	–	1
Grinnell	2	–	2	–	1	3	–	3	–	2
Kansas	2	–	5	–	1	2	–	5	–	1
Washington University	1	–	4	–	1	2	–	5	–	1
Oklahoma A&M	0	–	3	–	1	2	–	5	–	1
$ – Conference champion; Rankings from Dickinson System

The 1925 Washington University Pikers football team represented Washington University in St. Louis as a member of the Missouri Valley Conference during the 1925 college football season. In its first season under head coach Bob Higgins, the team compiled a 2–5–1 record and was outscored by a total of 95 to 29. The team played its home games at Francis Field in St. Louis.

== Schedule ==
Date	Time	Opponent	Site	Result	Attendance	Source
October 3		Drake	Francis Field; St. Louis, MO	L 0–5	4,500	
October 9		at SMU*	Fair Park Stadium; Dallas, TX	L 6–20		
October 17		Oklahoma A&M	Francis Field; St. Louis, MO	T 0–0		
October 24		at Iowa State	State Field; Ames, IA	L 13–28	5,000	
November 7		Missouri	Francis Field; St. Louis, MO	L 0–14		
November 14		Missouri Mines*	Francis Field; St. Louis, MO	W 7–0		
November 21		at Oklahoma	Memorial Stadium; Norman, OK	L 0–28		
November 26	2:00 p.m.	Grinnell	Francis Field; St. Louis, MO	W 3–0	6,000	
*Non-conference game; All times are in Central time
