= 1925 Oklahoma Sooners football team =

American college football season

1925 Oklahoma Sooners football
- Conference: Missouri Valley Conference
- Record: 4–3–1 (3–3–1 MVC)
- Head coach: Bennie Owen (21st season)
- Offensive scheme: Single-wing
- Captain: Ed Brockman
- Home stadium: Memorial Stadium

1925 Missouri Valley Conference football standings
	Conf.					Overall
Team	W		L		T	W		L		T
No. 5 Missouri $	5	–	1	–	0	6	–	1	–	1
Drake	5	–	2	–	0	5	–	3	–	0
Kansas State	3	–	2	–	1	5	–	2	–	1
Iowa State	3	–	2	–	1	4	–	3	–	1
Nebraska	2	–	2	–	1	4	–	2	–	2
Oklahoma	3	–	3	–	1	4	–	3	–	1
Grinnell	2	–	2	–	1	3	–	3	–	2
Kansas	2	–	5	–	1	2	–	5	–	1
Washington University	1	–	4	–	1	2	–	5	–	1
Oklahoma A&M	0	–	3	–	1	2	–	5	–	1
$ – Conference champion; Rankings from Dickinson System

The 1925 Oklahoma Sooners football team represented the University of Oklahoma as a member of the Missouri Valley Conference (MVC) during the 1925 college football season. In their 21st season under head coach Bennie Owen, the Sooners compiled an overall record of 4–3–1 with a mark of 3–3–1 in conference play, placing sixth in the MVC, and outscored opponents by a total of 93 to 44. The team played its home games at Memorial Stadium in Norman, Oklahoma.

No Sooners were recognized as All-Americans, nor did any Sooner receive all-conference honors.

== Schedule ==
Date	Opponent	Site	Result	Attendance	Source
October 3	at Kansas State	Memorial Stadium; Manhattan, KS	L 0–16		
October 17	Drake	Oklahoma Memorial Stadium; Norman, OK	W 7–0		
October 24	SMU*	Fair Park Stadium; Dallas, TX	W 9–0		
October 31	at Nebraska	Memorial Stadium; Lincoln, NE (rivalry)	L 0–12		
November 7	Kansas	Oklahoma Memorial Stadium; Norman, OK	T 0–0	~ 10,000	
November 14	at Missouri	Rollins Field; Columbia, MO (rivalry)	L 14–16	10,000	
November 21	Washington University	Oklahoma Memorial Stadium; Norman, OK	W 28–0		
November 26	Oklahoma A&M	Oklahoma Memorial Stadium; Norman, OK (rivalry)	W 35–0		
*Non-conference game
