= St. Edward's Crusaders football =

Defunct football program formerly representing St. Edward's University

- Last season: 1939
- Location: Austin, Texas

Conference championships
- 2

The St. Edward's Crusaders football team represented St. Edward's University, located in Austin, Texas, in college football. The team was known as the Saints prior to the 1933 season when head coach Jack Chevigny renamed them the Tigers. Prior to the 1939 season, the team was renamed again as the Crusaders. The program was discontinued after the 1939 season. The school's sports teams became known as the St. Edward's Hilltoppers after World War II.

St. Edward's was a member of the Texas Intercollegiate Athletic Association (TIAA) before moving to the Texas Conference in 1927. The football team won Texas Conference titles in 1933 and 1939.
