= 1912 Western Conference football season =

- Sport: Football
- Champion: Wisconsin

Football seasons
- 1911 1913

1912 Western Conference football standings
	Conf.					Overall
Team	W		L		T	W		L		T
Wisconsin $	5	–	0	–	0	7	–	0	–	0
Chicago	6	–	1	–	0	6	–	1	–	0
Purdue	2	–	2	–	1	4	–	2	–	1
Minnesota	2	–	2	–	0	4	–	3	–	0
Northwestern	2	–	3	–	0	2	–	3	–	1
Illinois	1	–	3	–	1	3	–	3	–	1
Iowa	1	–	3	–	0	4	–	3	–	0
Indiana	0	–	5	–	0	2	–	5	–	0
$ – Conference champion

The 1912 Western Conference football season was the seventeenth season of college football played by the member schools of the Western Conference (later known as the Big Ten Conference) and was a part of the 1912 college football season.

== Season overview ==
At 7-0 (5–0 in the Western Conference), Wisconsin took home the league championship and the 1912 national championship. The Badgers were led by first-year head coach William Juneau and team captain Joseph Hoeffel. Tackle Bob Butler, a junior, was named by Walter Camp to the 1912 College Football All-America Team.

Chicago finished as league runner-up again, falling only to the eventual National Champions for a second year in a row.

Purdue went 4-2-1 (2–2–1), Minnesota checked in at 4-3 (2-2), and Northwestern followed at 2-3-1 (2–3).

Illinois finished at 3-3-1 (1–3–1), with Iowa at 4-3 (1–3) and Indiana at 2-5 (0–5) rounding up the table.

=== Wisconsin ===
Date	Time	Opponent	Site	Result	Attendance	Source
October 5		Lawrence*	Randall Field; Madison, WI	W 13–0		
October 12		Northwestern	Randall Field; Madison, WI	W 56–0		
October 19		Purdue	Randall Field; Madison, WI	W 41–0		
November 2		Chicago^{†}	Randall Field; Madison, WI	W 30–12		
November 9	2:30 p.m.	Arkansas*	Randall Field; Madison, WI	W 64–7	2,000	
November 16		at Minnesota	Northrop Field; Minneapolis, MN (rivalry)	W 14–0	20,000	
November 23		at Iowa	Iowa Field; Iowa City, IA (rivalry)	W 28–10		
*Non-conference game; ^{†}Homecoming

=== Chicago ===
Date	Opponent	Site	Result	Attendance	Source
October 5	Indiana	Marshall Field; Chicago, IL	W 13–0		
October 19	Iowa	Marshall Field; Chicago, IL	W 34–14		
October 26	Purdue	Marshall Field; Chicago, IL (rivalry)	W 7–0		
November 2	at Wisconsin	Randall Field; Madison, WI	L 12–30		
November 9	Northwestern	Marshall Field; Chicago, IL	W 3–0		
November 16	at Illinois	Illinois Field; Champaign, IL	W 10–0	10,000	
November 23	Minnesota	Marshall Field; Chicago, IL	W 7–0	15,000	

=== Purdue ===
Date	Opponent	Site	Result	Source
October 5	DePauw*	Stuart Field; West Lafayette, IN	W 21–0	
October 19	at Wisconsin	Randall Field; Madison, WI	L 0–41	
October 26	at Chicago	Stagg Field; Chicago, IL (rivalry)	L 0–7	
November 3	at Northwestern	Northwestern Field; Evanston, IL	W 21–6	
November 9	Illinois	Stuart Field; West Lafayette, IN (rivalry)	T 9–9	
November 17	Rose Polytechnic*	Stuart Field; West Lafayette, IN	W 91–0	
November 24	Indiana	Stuart Field; West Lafayette, IN (rivalry)	W 34–7	
*Non-conference game

=== Minnesota ===
Date	Opponent	Site	Result	Attendance	Source
September 28	South Dakota*	Minneapolis, MN	L 0–10	3,500	
October 5	Iowa State*	Northrop Field; Minneapolis, MN	W 5–0	4,000	
October 19	Nebraska*	Northrop Field; Minneapolis, MN (rivalry)	W 13–0	10,000	
October 26	Iowa	Northrop Field; Minneapolis, MN (rivalry)	W 56–7	6,000	
November 2	Illinois	Northrop Field; Minneapolis, MN	W 13–0	9,000	
November 16	Wisconsin	Northrop Field; Minneapolis, MN (rivalry)	L 0–14	20,000	
November 23	at Chicago	Marshall Field; Chicago, IL	L 0–7	15,000	
*Non-conference game

=== Northwestern ===
Date	Opponent	Site	Result	Source
October 5	Lake Forest*	Northwestern Field; Evanston, IL	T 0–0	
October 12	at Wisconsin	Randall Field; Madison, WI	L 0–56	
October 26	at Indiana	Jordan Field; Bloomington, IN	W 20–7	
November 2	Purdue	Northwestern Field; Evanston, IL	L 6–21	
November 9	at Chicago	Marshall Field; Chicago, IL	L 0–3	
November 23	Illinois	Northwestern Field; Evanston, IL (rivalry)	W 6–0	
*Non-conference game

=== Illinois ===
Date	Time	Opponent	Site	Result	Attendance	Source
October 5		Illinois Wesleyan*	Illinois Field; Champaign, IL	W 87–3		
October 12	3:00 p.m	Washington University*	Illinois Field; Champaign, IL	W 13–0		
October 19		Indiana	Illinois Field; Champaign, IL (rivalry)	W 13–7		
November 2		at Minnesota	Northrop Field; Minneapolis, MN	L 0–13	9,000	
November 9		at Purdue	Lafayette, IN (rivalry)	T 9–9		
November 16		Chicago	Illinois Field; Champaign, IL	L 0–10	10,000	
November 23		at Northwestern	Sheppard Field; Evanston, IL (rivalry)	L 0–6		
*Non-conference game; All times are in Central time

=== Iowa ===
Date	Time	Opponent	Site	Result	Attendance	Source
October 5		Iowa State Teachers*	Iowa Field; Iowa City, IA	W 35–7		
October 12		Cornell (IA)*	Iowa Field; Iowa City, IA	W 31–0		
October 19		at Chicago	Marshall Field; Chicago, IL	L 14–34		
October 26		at Minnesota	Northrop Field; Minneapolis, MN (rivalry)	L 7–56	6,000	
November 9	2:30 p.m.	vs. Indiana	Washington Park; Indianapolis, IN	W 13–6	6,000	
November 16		at Iowa State*	State Field; Ames, IA (rivalry)	W 20–7		
November 22		Wisconsin^{†}	Iowa Field; Iowa City, IA (rivalry)	L 10–28		
*Non-conference game; ^{†}Homecoming

=== Indiana ===
Date	Time	Opponent	Site	Result	Attendance	Source
September 28		DePauw*	Jordan Field; Bloomington, IN	W 20–0		
October 5		at Chicago	Marshall Field; Chicago, IL	L 0–13		
October 19		at Illinois	Illinois Field; Champaign, IL (rivalry)	L 7–13		
October 26		Northwestern	Jordan Field; Bloomington, IN	L 7–20		
November 2		Earlham*	Jordan Field; Bloomington, IN	W 33–7		
November 9	2:30 p.m.	vs. Iowa	Washington Park; Indianapolis, IN	L 6–13	6,000	
November 24		at Purdue	Stuart Field; West Lafayette, IN (rivalry)	L 7–34		
*Non-conference game; All times are in Eastern time

=== Bowl games ===
No Western Conference schools participated in any bowl games during the 1912 season.
