= List of Nebraska Cornhuskers starting quarterbacks =

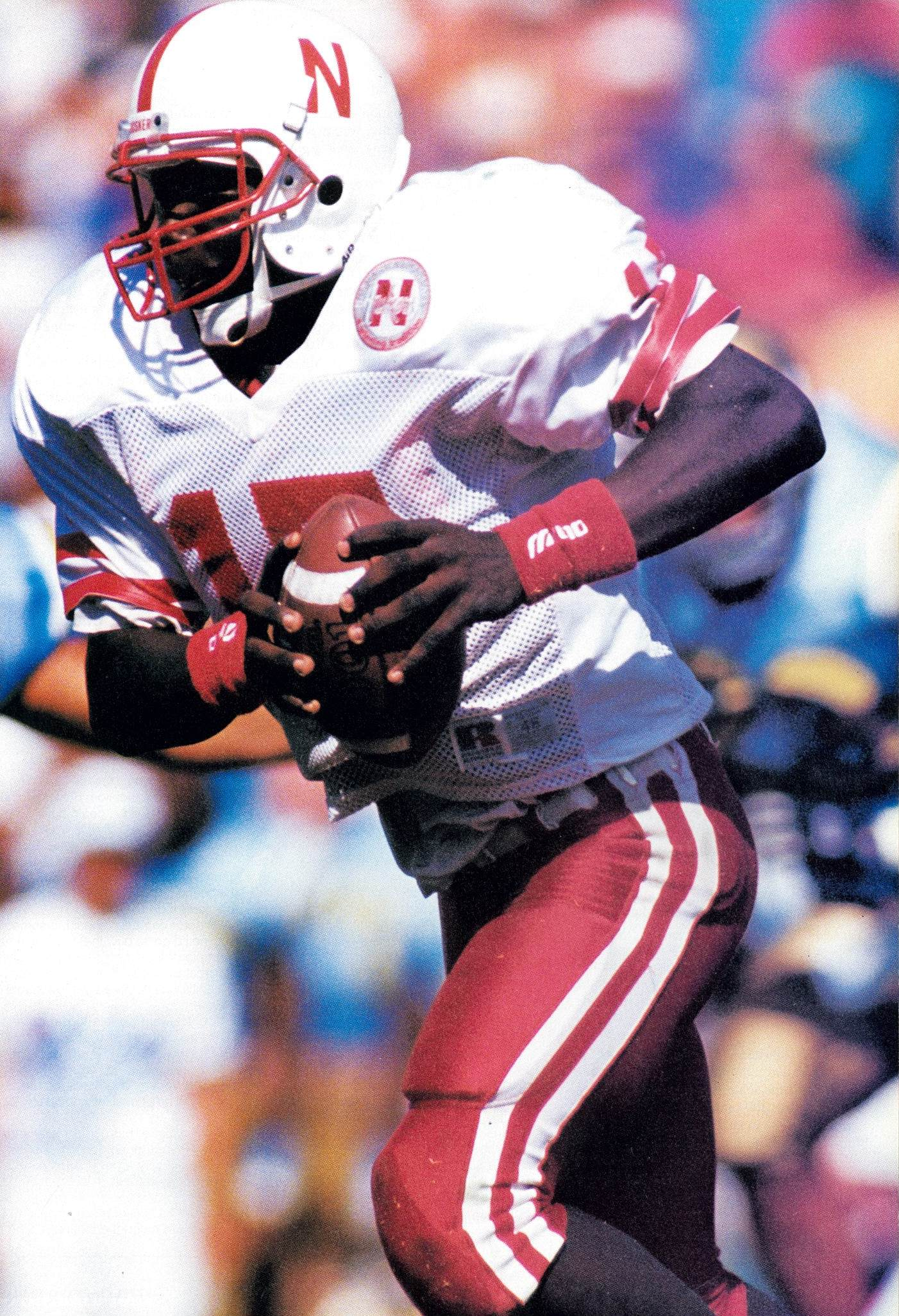
Tommie Frazier was 33–3 as Nebraska's starting quarterback from 1992 to 1995

This list of Nebraska Cornhuskers starting quarterbacks shows the quarterbacks who have started at least one game for the Nebraska Cornhuskers football program. Nebraska began competing in intercollegiate football in 1890, but early records are often incomplete and inconsistent. This list includes a complete list of starting quarterbacks from 1962 – the first year of Bob Devaney's tenure and the most recent season for which complete information is readily available – until the present day, as well as a partial list from 1890 to 1961.

Since 1962, fifty-eight quarterbacks have started at least one game for Nebraska. Tommy Armstrong started a program-record forty-four games from 2013 to 2016, one more than his predecessor Taylor Martinez. Heisman Trophy winner Eric Crouch won thirty-five games as NU's starter, passing Tommie Frazier for the most victories in school history.

== Partial list of starting quarterbacks before 1962 ==
This is a partial list of Nebraska starting quarterbacks before 1962. Official recordkeeping prior to the 1960s was sporadic and it is often difficult to determine game-by-game starting lineups, especially in college football's early years when positions were less defined.

Season	Starting quarterback(s) (W–L) (Note: Win-loss record only listed if all games are accounted for.)	Ref.
1890	Ernest Gerrard	
1891	Eugene Pace	
1892	Eugene Pace (2–2–1)	
1893	Eugene Pace (2–1) / Frank Crawford (Note: Head coach Frank Crawford started at quarterback for two games of the 1893 season.) (0–1–1) / Harry Frank (1–0)	
1896	Orley Thorpe	
1897	Howard Cowgill	
1898	Howard Cowgill / Ralph Drain / Ray Elliott	
1899	Harry Crandall	
1901	Ralph Drain	
1902	Maurice Benedict	
1903	John Bender	
1904	Leonard Barwick / Maurice Benedict / Gil McDonald (Note: Leonard Barwick and Gil McDonald were listed as co-starters for at least one game of the 1904 season.)	
1905	Earl Eager	
1906	Harold Cooke	
1907	Orlando Bentley / Harold Cooke (Note: Orlando Bentley and Harold Cooke were listed as co-starters for multiple games in each of the 1907 and 1908 seasons.)	
1908	Orlando Bentley / Harold Cooke	
1909	Orlando Bentley	
1910	Leon Warner	
1911	Leon Warner	
1912	Herbert Potter / Max Towle (Note: Herbert Potter and Max Towle were listed as co-starters for at least two games of the 1912 season.)	
1913	Max Towle (8–0)	
1914	Warren Howard / Max Towle / Leon Warner	
1915	Loren Caley	
1916	Loren Caley	
1917	John Cook / Elmer Schellenberg	
1918	Harry Howarth (2–2–1) / William Lantz (0–1)	
1919	Harry Howarth / Harold McGlasson	
1920	Richard Newman	
1921	Harold Hartley / Glen Preston	
1922	Glen Preston / Robert Russell	
1923	Rufus Dewitz / Verne Lewellen	
1924	Al Bloodgood	
1925	John Brown	
1926	Robert Stephens	
1927	Willard Bronson	
1928	Harold Frahm / Lafayette Russell	
1929	Harold Peaker	
1931	Bernie Masterson	
1932	Bernie Masterson	
1933	Bernie Masterson	
1936	John Howell / Thurston Phelps	
1937	John Howell / Thurston Phelps	
1939	Roy Petsch	
1940	Roy Petsch	
1941	Roy Petsch	
1943	Clark Beaver / Morris Galter / Ted Kenfield / Walt Wilkins	
1944	Bill Betz / Ed Gradoville	
1946	Sam Vacanti	
1948	Cletus Fischer	
1949	Fran Nagle	
1950	Fran Nagle	
1951	John Bordogna	
1952	John Bordogna	
1953	John Bordogna	
1954	Don Erway	
1955	Don Erway	
1956	Roy Stinnett	
1958	George Harshman	
1959	Harry Tolly	
1960	Pat Fischer	
1961	Dennis Claridge	

== List of starting quarterbacks since 1962 ==
Season	Starting quarterback(s) (W–L)	Ref.
1962	Dennis Claridge (8–2) / John Faiman (1–0)	
1963	Dennis Claridge (6–1) / Fred Duda (4–0)	
1964	Bob Churchich (6–2) / Fred Duda (3–0)	
1965	Fred Duda (8–1) / Bob Churchich (2–0)	
1966	Bob Churchich (9–2)	
1967	Frank Patrick (6–4)	
1968	Ernie Sigler (5–4) / Frank Patrick (1–0)	
1969	Van Brownson (5–1) / Jerry Tagge (4–1)	
1970	Jerry Tagge (8–0–1) / Van Brownson (3–0)	
1971	Jerry Tagge (13–0)	
1972	David Humm (9–2–1)	
1973	David Humm (7–2–1) / Steve Runty (2–0)	
1974	David Humm (9–3)	
1975	Vince Ferragamo (5–2) / Terry Luck (5–0)	
1976	Vince Ferragamo (9–3–1)	
1977	Randy Garcia (4–3) / Tom Sorley (5–0)	
1978	Tom Sorley (9–3)	
1979	Tim Hager (7–0) / Jeff Quinn (3–2)	
1980	Jeff Quinn (10–2)	
1981	Turner Gill (6–0) / Mark Mauer (2–2) / Nate Mason (1–1)	
1982	Turner Gill (11–1) / Bruce Mathison (1–0)	
1983	Turner Gill (12–1)	
1984	Craig Sundberg (5–1) / Travis Turner (5–1)	
1985	McCathorn Clayton (9–2) / Travis Turner (0–1)	
1986	Steve Taylor (9–2) / Clete Blakeman (1–0)	
1987	Steve Taylor (9–2) / Clete Blakeman (1–0)	
1988	Steve Taylor (11–2)	
1989	Gerry Gdowski (10–2)	
1990	Mickey Joseph (6–2) / Mike Grant (3–1)	
1991	Keithen McCant (8–2–1) / Mickey Joseph (1–0)	
1992	Tommie Frazier (5–2) / Mike Grant (4–1)	
1993	Tommie Frazier (11–1)	
1994	Brook Berringer (7–0) / Tommie Frazier (5–0) / Matt Turman (1–0)	
1995	Tommie Frazier (12–0)	
1996	Scott Frost (11–2)	
1997	Scott Frost (13–0)	
1998	Bobby Newcombe (5–1) / Eric Crouch (4–2) / Monte Christo (0–1)	
1999	Eric Crouch (10–1) / Bobby Newcombe (2–0)	
2000	Eric Crouch (10–2)	
2001	Eric Crouch (11–2)	
2002	Jammal Lord (7–7)	
2003	Jammal Lord (10–3)	
2004	Joe Dailey (5–6)	
2005	Zac Taylor (8–4)	
2006	Zac Taylor (9–5)	
2007	Sam Keller (4–5) / Joe Ganz (1–2)	
2008	Joe Ganz (9–4)	
2009	Zac Lee (8–4) / Cody Green (2–0)	
2010	Taylor Martinez (8–4) / Cody Green (2–0)	
2011	Taylor Martinez (9–4)	
2012	Taylor Martinez (10–4)	
2013	Tommy Armstrong (7–1) / Taylor Martinez (2–2) / Ron Kellogg (0–1)	
2014	Tommy Armstrong (9–4)	
2015	Tommy Armstrong (6–6) / Ryker Fyfe (0–1)	
2016	Tommy Armstrong (8–3) / Ryker Fyfe (1–1)	
2017	Tanner Lee (4–8)	
2018	Adrian Martinez (4–7) / Andrew Bunch (0–1)	
2019	Adrian Martinez (5–5) / Noah Vedral (0–2)	
2020	Adrian Martinez (2–4) / Luke McCaffrey (1–1)	
2021	Adrian Martinez (3–8) / Logan Smothers (0–1)	
2022	Casey Thompson (4–6) / Chubba Purdy (0–2)	
2023	Heinrich Haarberg (5–3) / Chubba Purdy (0–2) / Jeff Sims (0–2)	
2024	Dylan Raiola (7–6)	
2025	Dylan Raiola (6–3) / TJ Lateef (1–3)	

== Starts by quarterback ==
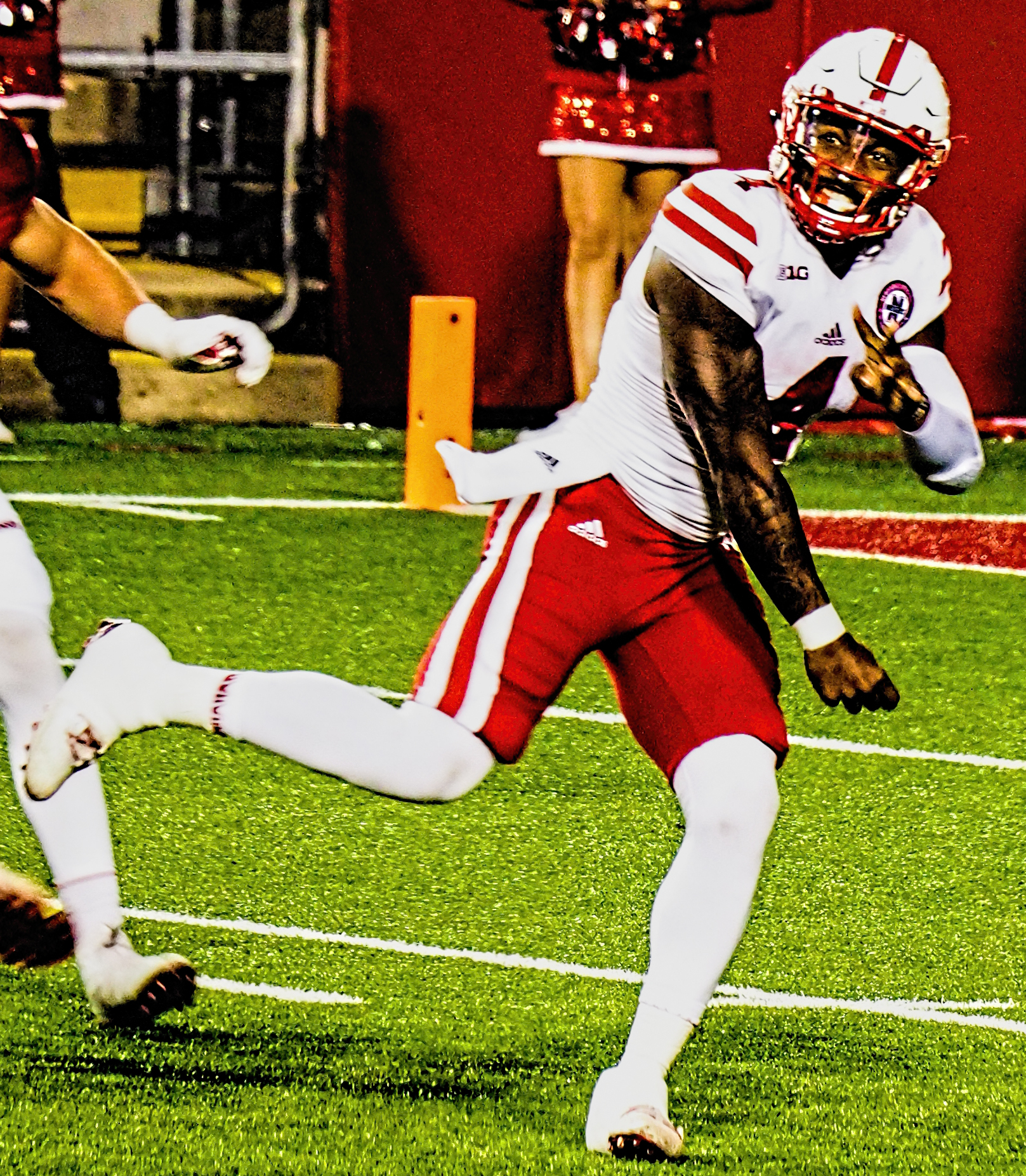
Tommy Armstrong started more games for Nebraska than any other quarterback

Quarterback	Starts	Wins	Win pct.
Tommy Armstrong	44	30	.682
Taylor Martinez	43	29	.674
Eric Crouch	42	35	.833
Adrian Martinez	38	14	.368
Tommie Frazier	36	33	.917
Steve Taylor	35	29	.829
David Humm	34	25	.765
Turner Gill	31	29	.935
Jerry Tagge	27	25	.944
Jammal Lord	27	17	.630
Scott Frost	26	24	.923
Zac Taylor	26	17	.654
Dylan Raiola	22	13	.591
Bob Churchich	21	17	.810
Vince Ferragamo	20	14	.725
Dennis Claridge (Note: Dennis Claridge started at quarterback for most of the 1961 season. For consistency, these games are not included in this table.)	17	14	.824
Tom Sorley	17	14	.824
Jeff Quinn	17	13	.765
Fred Duda	16	15	.938
Joe Ganz	16	10	.625
Gerry Gdowski	12	10	.833
Zac Lee	12	8	.667
Tanner Lee	12	4	.333
McCathorn Clayton	11	9	.818
Keithen McCant	11	8	.773
Frank Patrick	11	7	.636
Joe Dailey	11	5	.455
Casey Thompson	10	4	.400
Van Brownson	9	8	.889
Mike Grant	9	7	.778
Mickey Joseph	9	7	.778
Ernie Sigler	9	5	.556
Sam Keller	9	4	.444
Bobby Newcombe	8	7	.875
Heinrich Haarberg	8	5	.625
Brook Berringer	7	7	1.000
Tim Hager	7	7	1.000
Travis Turner	7	5	.714
Randy Garcia	7	4	.571
Craig Sundberg	6	5	.833
Terry Luck	5	5	1.000
Cody Green	4	4	1.000
Mark Mauer	4	2	.500
TJ Lateef	4	1	.250
Chubba Purdy	4	0	.000
Ryker Fyfe	3	1	.333
Clete Blakeman	2	2	1.000
Steve Runty	2	2	1.000
Nate Mason	2	1	.500
Luke McCaffrey	2	1	.500
Jeff Sims	2	0	.000
Noah Vedral	2	0	.000
John Faiman	1	1	1.000
Bruce Mathison	1	1	1.000
Matt Turman	1	1	1.000
Andrew Bunch	1	0	.000
Ron Kellogg	1	0	.000
Logan Smothers	1	0	.000
Monte Christo	1	0	.000
