= Missouri Valley Conference football =

- Conference: NCAA
- Founded: 1907
- Folded: 1985
- Sports fielded: 1 (football); men's: 1; women's: 0
- Division: Division I-A; Division I-AA
- No. of teams: 7 (final), 29 (total)
- Region: Midwest

Locations
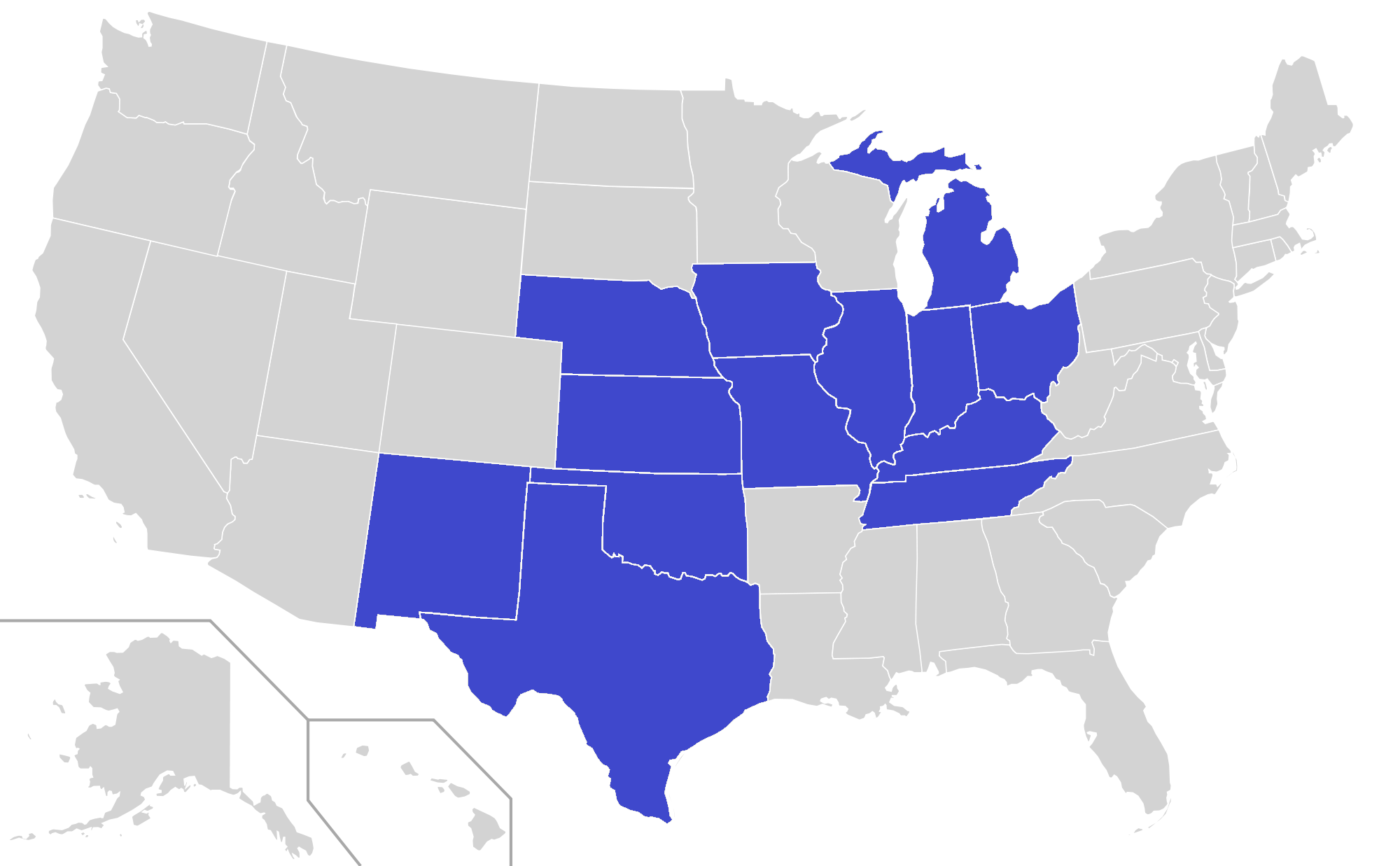

This is a page on the history of Missouri Valley Conference football. The Missouri Valley Conference sponsored football from 1907 through the 1985 school year. The conference voted to drop football as a sport on April 30, 1985. At the time the Conference was a mixture of NCAA division I-A programs (Tulsa and Wichita State) and NCAA division I-AA programs (Drake, Illinois State, Indiana State, Southern Illinois, and West Texas State).

== History ==
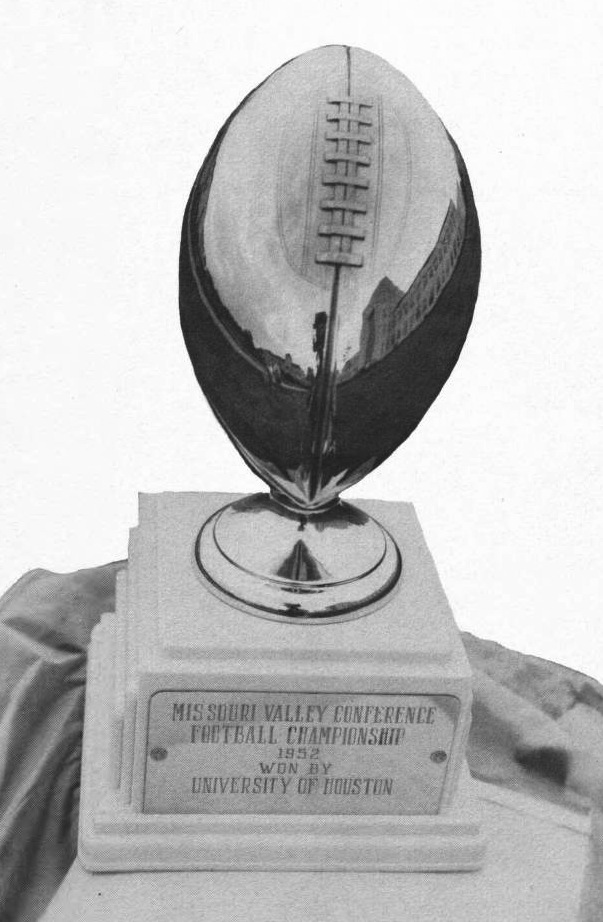
Houston's 1952 Missouri Valley Conference championship trophy

The Missouri Valley Conference started sponsoring football in the fall of 1907. In 1951 Drake University and Bradley University left the Missouri Valley Conference as a result of the Johnny Bright incident, a racially motivated on-field attack against Drake's black star Johnny Bright by a white Oklahoma A&M player. Both schools returned to the MVC for non-football sports several years later (Bradley in 1955 and Drake in 1956), but Bradley never rejoined for football (dropping the sport in 1970), and Drake didn't rejoin in football until 1971. Washburn University competed in football from 1935 through 1940. Saint Louis University dropped football after the 1949 season.

By the late 1960s, rising costs for football meant that basketball could no longer help subsidize football programs. According to a 2017 story in The Wichita Eagle, "The MVC looked west to find football and alienated its basketball powers." The first schools brought in during this period were New Mexico State and West Texas State (now West Texas A&M), respectively joining in 1970 and 1971; the conference also established a tie-in with the now-defunct Pasadena Bowl.

The new additions almost immediately led to conflict between several established members and the conference office. Cincinnati, Louisville, and Memphis State (now Memphis) complained about travel costs, and Memphis State was bitterly opposed to a full round-robin conference schedule, wishing to play more games within its region. All three schools left the MVC within a four-year period in the 1970s—Cincinnati in 1971, Memphis State in 1973, and Louisville in 1975. At the time of Memphis State's departure, Bradley's then-athletic director publicly said, "We sort of pushed Memphis out. They didn’t want to play everybody in football and we said that they must." These were not the only departures from the conference during this period; non-football member Saint Louis left in 1974, wishing to compete with urban basketball-focused schools like itself, and North Texas State (now North Texas) went independent in 1975 due to a desire for more scheduling flexibility. The MVC attempted to reload by adding Southern Illinois (1974 for non-football sports, 1977 for football), Indiana State (1976), and Illinois State (1980 for non-football sports, 1981 for football). The two schools whose arrival led to this instability would themselves leave in the 1980s—New Mexico State left after the 1982 season, and West Texas State left after the conference's final football season of 1985.

On December 5, 2006 the Missouri Valley Conference released its All-Centennial team.

== Membership timeline ==
This membership timeline reflects only Missouri Valley Conference football, not the Missouri Valley Conference as a whole.

== Champions by year ==
Season	Champion
1907	Iowa & Nebraska
1908	Kansas
1909	Missouri
1910	Nebraska
1911	Iowa State & Nebraska
1912	Iowa State & Nebraska
1913	Missouri & Nebraska
1914	Nebraska
1915	Nebraska
1916	Nebraska
1917	Nebraska
1918	No Champion
1919	Missouri
1920	Oklahoma
1921	Nebraska
1922	Nebraska
1923	Nebraska
1924	Missouri
1925	Missouri
1926	Oklahoma A&M
1927	Missouri
1928	Drake
1929	Drake
1930	Drake & Oklahoma A&M
1931	Drake
1932	Oklahoma A&M
1933	Oklahoma A&M
1934	Washington (MO)
1935	Tulsa & Washington (MO)
1936	Creighton & Tulsa
1937	Tulsa
1938	Tulsa
1939	Washington (MO)
1940	Tulsa
1941	Tulsa
1942	Tulsa
1943	Tulsa
1944	Oklahoma A&M
1945	Oklahoma A&M
1946	Tulsa
1947	Tulsa
1948	Oklahoma A&M
1949	Detroit
1950	Tulsa
1951	Tulsa
1952	Houston
1953	Detroit & Oklahoma A&M
1954	Wichita State
1955	Detroit & Wichita State
1956	Houston
1957	Houston
1958	North Texas State
1959	Houston & North Texas State
1960	Wichita State
1961	Wichita State
1962	Tulsa
1963	Cincinnati & Wichita State
1964	Cincinnati
1965	Tulsa
1966	North Texas State & Tulsa
1967	North Texas State
1968	Memphis State
1969	Memphis State
1970	Louisville
1971	Memphis State & North Texas State
1972	Drake, Louisville, & West Texas State
1973	North Texas State & Tulsa
1974	Tulsa
1975	Tulsa
1976	New Mexico State & Tulsa
1977	West Texas State
1978	New Mexico State
1979	West Texas State
1980	Tulsa
1981	Drake & Tulsa
1982	Tulsa
1983	Tulsa
1984	Tulsa
1985	Tulsa

== Championships by school ==
School	Years of Participation	MVC Championships	Last MVC Championship	Last Outright MVC Championship
Iowa	1907–1908	1	1907	–
Nebraska	1907–1918; 1921–1927	12	1923	1923
Kansas	1907–1927	1	1908	1908
Missouri	1907–1927	6	1927	1927
Washington U.	1907–1942	3	1939	1939
Iowa State	1908–1927	2	1912	–
Drake	1908–1951; 1971–1985	6	1981	1931
Kansas State	1913–1927	0	–	–
Grinnell	1919–1938	0	–	–
Oklahoma	1920–1927	1	1920	1920
Oklahoma A&M	1925–1956	8	1953	1948
Creighton	1928–1942	1	1936	–
Butler	1932–1933	0	–	–
Washburn	1935–1940	0	–	–
Tulsa	1935–1985	25	1985	1985
Saint Louis	1937–1949	0	–	–
Wichita State	1945–1985	5	1963	1961
Bradley	1948–1951	0	–	–
Detroit	1949–1956	3	1955	1949
Houston	1951–1959	4	1959	1957
Cincinnati	1957–1969	2	1964	1964
North Texas State	1957–1974	6	1973	1971
Louisville	1963–1974	2	1972	1970
Memphis State	1968–1972	3	1971	1969
New Mexico State	1970–1982	2	1978	1978
West Texas State	1971–1985	3	1979	1979
Southern Illinois	1974–1985	0	–	–
Indiana State	1976–1985	0	–	–
Illinois State	1980–1985	0	–	–
