= Hoeffel =

Hoeffel is a surname. Notable people with the surname include:

- Joseph Hoeffel (1890–1964), American football player
- Joe Hoeffel (born 1950), American author and politician
- Mike Hoeffel (born 1989), American ice hockey player
