= 1912 Kansas Jayhawks football team =

American college football season

1912 Kansas Jayhawks football
- Conference: Missouri Valley Conference
- Record: 4–4 (1–2 MVC)
- Head coach: Arthur Mosse (1st season)
- Captain: Howard Brownlee
- Home stadium: McCook Field

1912 Missouri Valley Conference football standings
	Conf.					Overall
Team	W		L		T	W		L		T
Nebraska +	2	–	0	–	0	8	–	1	–	0
Iowa State +	2	–	0	–	0	6	–	2	–	0
Drake	2	–	2	–	0	5	–	3	–	0
Missouri	2	–	3	–	0	5	–	3	–	0
Kansas	1	–	2	–	0	4	–	4	–	0
Washington University	0	–	2	–	0	4	–	4	–	0
+ – Conference co-champions

The 1912 Kansas Jayhawks football team was an American football team that represented the University of Kansas as a member of the Missouri Valley Conference (MVC) during the 1912 college football season. In their first season under head coach Arthur Mosse, the Jayhawks compiled a 4–4 record (1–2 against conference opponents), finished in fifth place in the MVC, and outscored opponents by a total of 128 to 45. The Jayhawks played their home games at McCook Field in Lawrence, Kansas. Howard Brownlee was the team captain.

== Schedule ==
Date	Opponent	Site	Result	Attendance	Source
October 5	St. Mary's (KS)*	McCook Field; Lawrence, KS	W 62–0		
October 12	Warrensburg Teachers*	McCook Field; Lawrence, KS	W 27–0		
October 19	at Drake	Des Moines, IA	L 0–6		
October 26	Kansas State*	McCook Field; Lawrence, KS (rivalry)	W 19–6		
November 2	Oklahoma*	McCook Field; Lawrence, KS	L 5–6		
November 9	at Washburn*	Topeka, KS	L 0–10		
November 16	at Nebraska	Nebraska Field; Lincoln, NE (rivalry)	L 3–14	7,000	
November 23	Missouri^{†}	McCook Field; Lawrence, KS (rivalry)	W 12–3		
*Non-conference game; ^{†}Homecoming
