= 1912 Kansas State Aggies football team =

American college football season

1912 Kansas State Aggies football

KCAC champion
- Conference: Kansas Collegiate Athletic Conference
- Record: 8–2 (5–0 KCAC)
- Head coach: Guy Lowman (2nd season)
- Home stadium: Ahearn Field

The 1912 Kansas State Aggies football team represented Kansas State Agricultural College in the 1912 college football season. They were champion of the Kansas Collegiate Athletic Conference for the third time in four seasons, although it was not officially sanctioned.

== Schedule ==
Date	Opponent	Site	Result	Source
September 28	Southwestern (KS)	Ahearn Field; Manhattan, KS	W 19–7	
October 5	Haskell*	Ahearn Field; Manhattan, KS	W 21–14	
October 12	at Nebraska*	Nebraska Field; Lincoln, NE (rivalry)	L 6–30	
October 19	Kansas State Normal	Ahearn Field; Manhattan, KS	W 22–7	
October 26	at Kansas*	McCook Field; Lawrence, KS (rivalry)	L 6–19	
November 2	at Fairmount	Wichita, KS	W 54–0	
November 8	College of Emporia	Ahearn Field; Manhattan, KS	W 28–7	
November 16	Colorado*	Ahearn Field; Manhattan, KS (rivalry)	W 14–6	
November 20	at Texas A&M*	Kyle Field; College Station, TX	W 13–10	
November 28	Washburn	Ahearn Field; Manhattan, KS	W 21–3	
*Non-conference game
