= 1912 Adrian Bulldogs football team =

American college football season

1912 Adrian Bulldogs football
- Conference: Michigan Intercollegiate Athletic Association
- Record: 5–3 (0–0 MIAA)
- Head coach: Tom Leith (3rd season)

The 1912 Adrian Bulldogs football team represented Adrian College during the 1912 college football season.

== Schedule ==
Date	Opponent	Site	Result	Source
	Windsor Collegiate Institute of Ontario*		W 34–0	
	Detroit Wolverine Club*		W 19–0	
October 12	at Notre Dame*	Cartier Field; Notre Dame, IN	L 7–74	
	Ohio Northern*	Adrian, MI	L 0–27	
October 23	at Detroit Heralds*	Detroit, MI	W 14–6	
October 26	at Nebraska*	Nebraska Field; Lincoln, NE	L 0–41	
	Michigan Freshman*		W 23–15	
	Heidelberg*		W 39–6	
*Non-conference game
