= Floyd Daniel Hargiss =

American football coach

Biographical details
- Born: September 28, 1889; Crawford, Kansas, U.S.
- Died: August 19, 1972 (aged 82); Seattle, Washington, U.S.

Coaching career (HC unless noted)

Football
- 1912: Ottawa (KS)

Basketball
- 1912–1913: Ottawa (KS)

Head coaching record
- Overall: 1–5 (football)

Floyd Daniel "Bob" Hargiss (September 28, 1889 – August 19, 1972) was an American college football and college basketball coach. He served as the head football coach at Ottawa University in Ottawa, Kansas for one season, in 1912, compiling a record of 1–5. Hargiss was the brother of Homer Woodson Hargiss.

Hargiss died on August 19, 1972, in Seattle. He had suffered a heart attack three weeks prior.
