= Halfback option play =

Type of play in American Football

The halfback option play is an unorthodox play in American and Canadian football. It resembles a normal running play, but the running back has the option to throw a pass to another eligible receiver before crossing the line of scrimmage.

== Strategy and execution ==
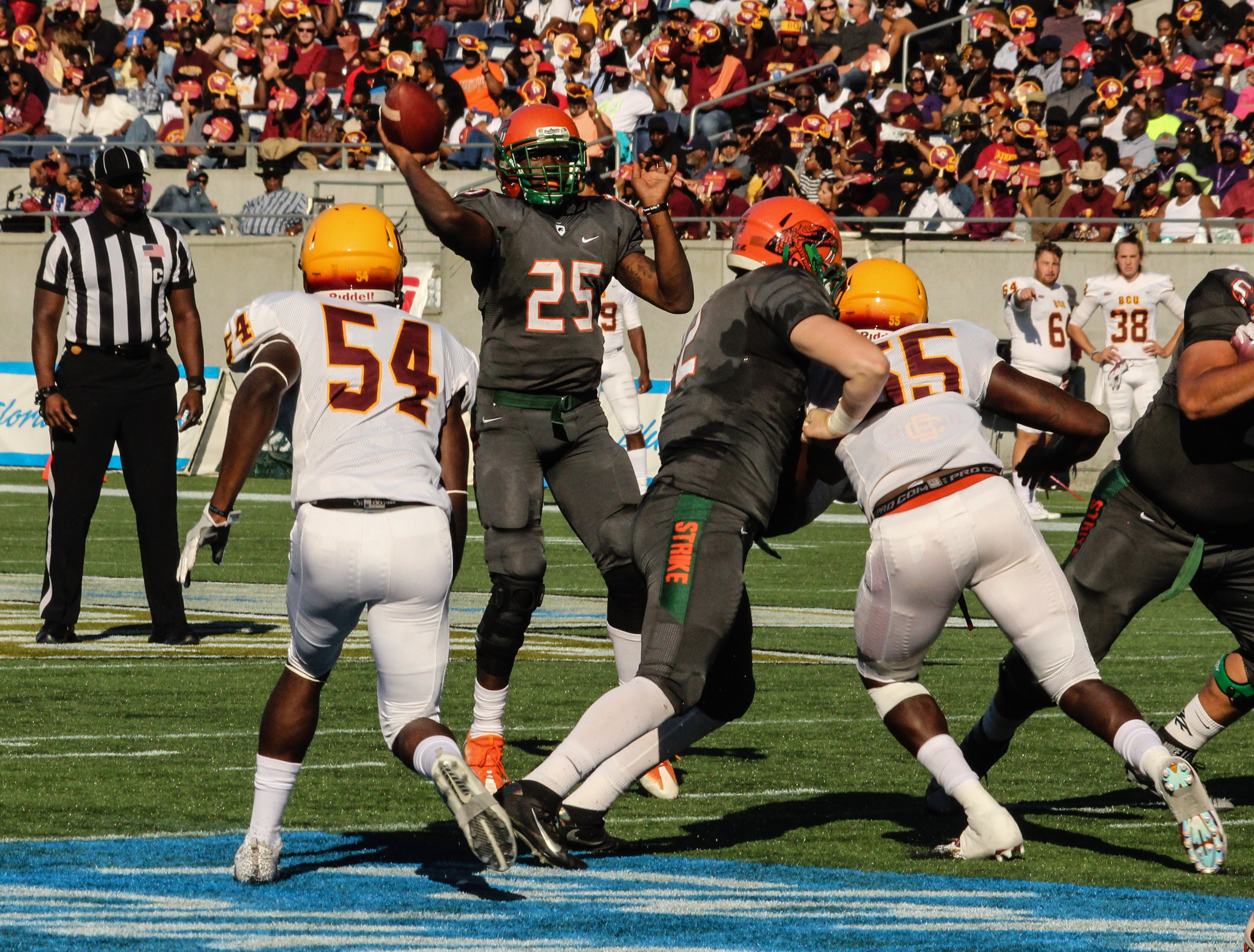
Florida A&M halfback Devin Bowers attempts a pass during the 2016 Florida Classic.

The running play that halfback options usually resemble is a sweep play. Sometimes the quarterback will run out of the backfield and become a receiving option for the running back. This can be effective because the quarterback usually does very little after handing off or pitching the ball to the running back on most plays, and the defense might not be expecting him to be used as an active receiver. In the National Football League (NFL), if the quarterback starts the play under center, then he is ineligible as a receiver; the quarterback must start from a shotgun formation to receive a pass.

The key to the play is fooling the defensive players, primarily the defensive backs. If the linebackers and/or the defensive line are fooled and believe the ball carrier is attempting a run, they will pursue the runner, abandoning their pass defense responsibilities and thereby leaving pass receivers uncovered. If the defensive backs are not fooled, the running back carrying the ball does have the option to run, instead of risking an incomplete pass or an interception. This play is not as popular as it once was as defensive players are expected to cover receivers until the football crosses the line of scrimmage on running plays.

The halfback option play usually has limited success and is not commonly used, especially in the NFL. The play almost completely relies on the element of surprise and better coaching has resulted in defensive backs being instructed to stay in coverage until the running back with the ball crosses the line of scrimmage. Another reason is that the passing ability of most running backs is usually poor in relation to the passing ability of a quarterback. However, certain teams and players do successfully run the option one to a few times a season; used sparingly it can be effective to make a game-changing play.

In modern professional football history, a halfback has only thrown more than one touchdown in four games: halfback Frank Gifford of the New York Giants threw two touchdown passes in a 1954 game against the Chicago Cardinals, halfback Paul Hornung of the Green Bay Packers threw two touchdown passes in a 1959 NFL game against the Los Angeles Rams; utility player Gene Mingo of the Denver Broncos threw two touchdowns as a halfback in an American Football League (AFL) game against the Buffalo Bills in 1961; and running back Walter Payton of the Chicago Bears threw two touchdowns in a 1983 NFL game against the New Orleans Saints.

The halfback option play is an integral part of the wildcat offense, which involves the halfback receiving a direct snap.

== Notable instances ==
There have been many notable cases where the halfback option pass has been used with great success.

- Perhaps the first use of the play occurred under Homer Woodson Hargiss at the College of Emporia in 1910.
- In Super Bowl XII, Dallas Cowboys fullback Robert Newhouse threw a 29-yard touchdown pass to wide receiver Golden Richards, versus the Denver Broncos, becoming the first fullback/halfback to throw a touchdown pass in Super Bowl history. QB Roger Staubach took the snap and pitched the ball to Newhouse who ran left, faking a sweep, before pulling up and throwing a game sealing pass to Richards.
- The Los Angeles Rams successfully used a halfback option in Super Bowl XIV, with quarterback Vince Ferragamo handing the ball off to running back Lawrence McCutcheon who then passed it to wide receiver Ron Smith for a 24-yard touchdown.
- In Super Bowl XXII, Denver Broncos quarterback John Elway caught a 23-yard pass from halfback Steve Sewell on the halfback option play, becoming the first quarterback ever to catch a pass in the Super Bowl.
- Former San Diego Chargers running back LaDainian Tomlinson successfully threw seven touchdowns on option passes on just twelve career passing attempts.
- In college football, the Arkansas Razorbacks used halfback option passes with great success in 2006, using running back Darren McFadden in the role.
- During the 2008 NFL season, the halfback option play became particularly popular with the advent of the Wildcat formation. In Week 3 of that season, the play was used no less than nine times across the league, four times by Miami Dolphins running back Ronnie Brown, twice by McFadden, and once by Baltimore Ravens running back Willis McGahee.
- A halfback option pass was one of the many trick plays successfully used by Boise State in its win over Oklahoma in the 2007 Fiesta Bowl.
- The Cincinnati Bengals successfully used a halfback option in Super Bowl LVI, with quarterback Joe Burrow pitching the ball to running back Joe Mixon who then passed it to wide receiver Tee Higgins for a 6-yard touchdown.
- Fictionally, the 1998 film The Waterboy prominently featured the halfback option as the game-winning play, with Bobby Boucher, in position as halfback, completing a Hail Mary pass to quarterback Guy Grenouille.
