= Beulah, Kansas =

Unincorporated community in Crawford County, Kansas

- Unincorporated community
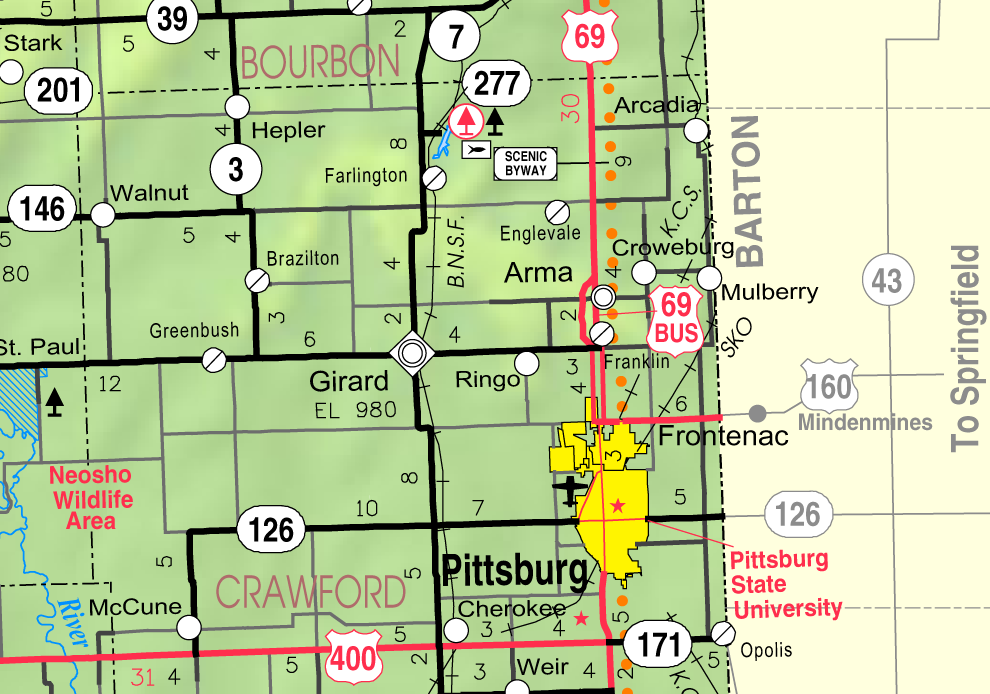
- KDOT map of Crawford County (legend)

- Location within Kansas Location within the United States
- Coordinates: 37°26′25″N 94°49′42″W
- Country: United States
- State: Kansas
- County: Crawford
- Founded: 1874
- Elevation: 974 ft (297 m)
- Time zone: UTC-6 (CST)
  - Summer (DST): UTC-5 (CDT)
- Area code: 620
- FIPS code: 20-06475
- GNIS ID: 469727

Beulah is an unincorporated community in Crawford County, Kansas, United States.

== History ==
Beulah was founded in 1874 by a colony of Methodists. The Methodist church was completed in 1881. A post office was opened in Beulah on December 31, 1874, and remained in operation until it was discontinued on March 15, 1955.

Beulah was a station on the St. Louis–San Francisco Railway.

== Notable people ==
College football coach and innovator Homer Woodson Hargiss went to Beulah High School before it closed.
