= 1912 Iowa Hawkeyes football team =

American college football season

1912 Iowa Hawkeyes football

Iowa state champion
- Conference: Western Conference
- Record: 4–3 (1–3 Western)
- Head coach: Jesse Hawley (3rd season)
- Captain: Henry Hanson
- Home stadium: Iowa Field

1912 Western Conference football standings
	Conf.					Overall
Team	W		L		T	W		L		T
Wisconsin $	5	–	0	–	0	7	–	0	–	0
Chicago	6	–	1	–	0	6	–	1	–	0
Purdue	2	–	2	–	1	4	–	2	–	1
Minnesota	2	–	2	–	0	4	–	3	–	0
Northwestern	2	–	3	–	0	2	–	3	–	1
Illinois	1	–	3	–	1	3	–	3	–	1
Iowa	1	–	3	–	0	4	–	3	–	0
Indiana	0	–	5	–	0	2	–	5	–	0
$ – Conference champion

The 1912 Iowa Hawkeyes football team was an American football team that represented the State University of Iowa ("S.U.I."), now commonly known as the University of Iowa, as a member of the Western Conference during the 1912 college football season. In their third year under head coach Jesse Hawley, the Hawkeyes compiled a 4–3 record (1–3 in conference games), finished in seventh place in the Western Conference, and were outscored by a total of 138 to 130. With victories over Iowa State Teachers, Cornell (IA), and Iowa State, the Hawkeyes won the Iowa state football championship.

Guard Henry Hanson was the team captain. Tackle Jim Trickey was selected as a second-team All-American by Walter Camp, the highest postseason honor ever given by Camp to an Iowa player. Trickey was also selected as a first-team All-American by Alfred S. Harvey of the Milwaukee Free Press

The team played its home games at Iowa Field in Iowa City, Iowa.

== Schedule ==
Date	Time	Opponent	Site	Result	Attendance	Source
October 5		Iowa State Teachers*	Iowa Field; Iowa City, IA	W 35–7		
October 12		Cornell (IA)*	Iowa Field; Iowa City, IA	W 31–0		
October 19		at Chicago	Marshall Field; Chicago, IL	L 14–34		
October 26		at Minnesota	Northrop Field; Minneapolis, MN (rivalry)	L 7–56	6,000	
November 9	2:30 p.m.	vs. Indiana	Washington Park; Indianapolis, IN	W 13–6	6,000	
November 16		at Iowa State*	State Field; Ames, IA (rivalry)	W 20–7		
November 22		Wisconsin^{†}	Iowa Field; Iowa City, IA (rivalry)	L 10–28		
*Non-conference game; ^{†}Homecoming

== Players ==
The following 14 players received major varsity letters for their participation on the 1912 Iowa team:

- George Buckley, end
- Homer Clemons, guard
- Paul Curry, quarterback
- Leo Dick, halfback
- Arthur Gunderson, end
- Harry Hanson, guard and captain
- Max Houghton, tackle/center
- Archie Kirk, fullback/tackle
- Ralph McGinnis, fullback
- Charles Meloy, quarterback
- Charles Parsons, halfback
- Jim Trickey, tackle
- Harold Van Meter, halfback
- Herman Von Lackum, end

In addition, the I.A.U. insignia was given to Joseph Carberry, Carl Bowen, Karl Brueckner, and Walter Penningroth.
