= Homer Woodson Hargiss =

American athlete and coach (1887–1978)

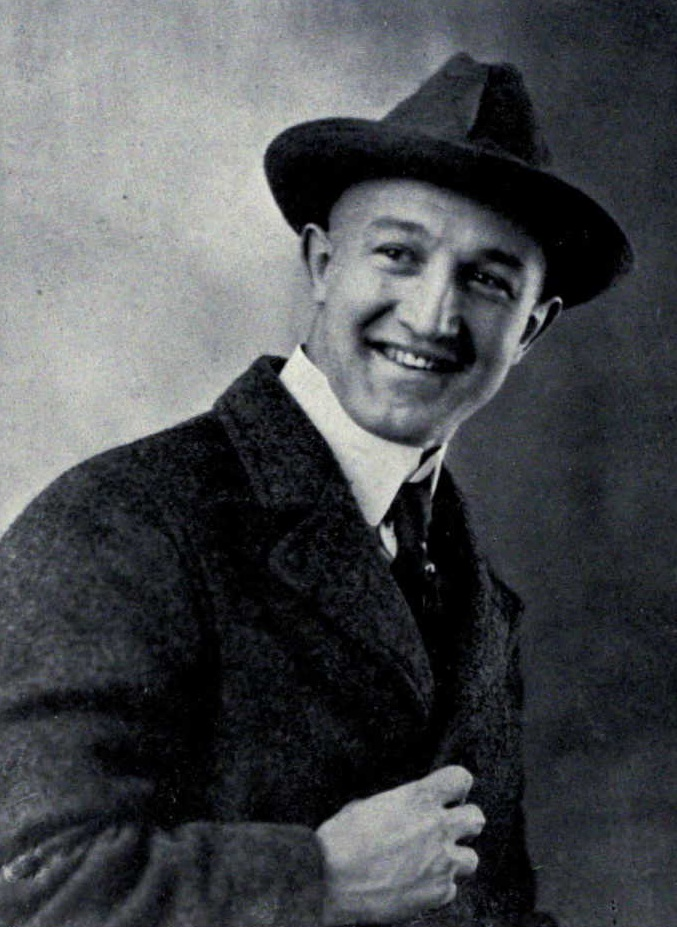
- Hargiss from The Beaver, 1920

Biographical details
- Born: September 1, 1887; Cherokee County, Kansas, U.S.
- Died: October 15, 1978 (aged 91); Lawrence, Kansas, U.S.

Playing career

Football
- 1905–1909: Kansas State Normal
- Position: Fullback

Coaching career (HC unless noted)

Football
- 1910–1912: College of Emporia
- 1913: Kansas (assistant)
- 1914–1917: Kansas State Normal
- 1918–1919: Oregon Agricultural
- 1920–1927: Kansas State Normal/Teachers
- 1928–1932: Kansas

Basketball
- 1918–1920: Oregon Agricultural

Track and field
- 1932–1943: Kansas

Wrestling
- 1919: Oregon Agricultural

Head coaching record
- Overall: 102–54–16 (football); 10–25 (basketball)

Accomplishments and honors

Championships
- Football; 4 KCAC (1915–1916, 1926–1927); 1 Big Six (1930)

Homer Woodson "Bill" Hargiss (September 1, 1887 – October 15, 1978) was an American athlete and coach. He played American football and basketball and also competed in track and field events. Additionally, Hargis coached athletics at several colleges in the states of Kansas and Oregon. As an American football coach during the sport's early years, Hargis was an innovator. He was among few coaches in using the forward pass and the huddle, now staple features of the game.

== Playing career ==
Hargiss participated in sports at Kansas Normal College, now Emporia State University. He was a standout at the college in football, baseball, basketball, gymnastics, boxing, and track and field. Emporia State honored him in 1982 by inducting him into their "Athletic Hall of Honor"—the first year the honor was available, as a distinguished alumni in 1970, and for the all-Centennial Team in 1997.

== Coaching career ==
=== College of Emporia ===
Hargiss' first coaching job came as the head coach of the College of Emporia (C of E) in Emporia, Kansas. The school had a well-developed rivalry with Kansas State Normal School, where Hargiss played quarterback the previous year, and would later coach.

At C of E, Hargiss developed plays using talented quarterback Arthur Schabinger that most had never seen before, namely the forward pass and the option pass.

Hargiss and Arthur Schabinger reminisce about the early days of the forward pass at a C of E reunion

==== Forward pass ====
In the team's 1910 game at Washburn, Arthur Schabinger has been credited by some to have thrown the first legal forward pass in college football history. While this claim is widely disputed by other colleges (there are multiple claims dating back to 1906), College of Emporia most certainly was one of the first innovators of the play particularly to throw "overhand" forward passes instead of the more common "underhand" passes. The school was using the forward pass as a regular play three years before Knute Rockne and Notre Dame.

For the second to last game in 1910, Schabringer scored seven touchdowns in a 107–0 win over Pittsburg Normal. The forward pass played a major role in the game as well.

==== Option pass ====
Hargiss also ran the option pass play (possibly the first of all time) at the College of Emporia in 1910. The "option pass" play was a sweep to the end with halfbacks that would either pass or run depending on how the defensive play would develop.

=== Oregon Agricultural College ===
Hargiss was the head football, basketball, and track coach at Oregon Agricultural College (today's Oregon State University) from 1918 to 1919. During his tenure there, he compiled a 6–8–1 record. In 1918-19 and 1919-20 he also coached the OAC Aggies basketball team.

=== Emporia State ===
Hargiss' 1927 Hornets team featured two future NFL players, Slim Campbell (#21) and Dale Burnett (#23).

Hargiss was the ninth and twelfth head football coach for Kansas State Teachers College in Emporia, Kansas and he held that position for twelve seasons, from 1914 until 1917 and then returning from 1920 until 1927. His overall coaching record at Emporia State was 61–23–11. This ranks him third at Emporia State in terms of total wins and first in terms of winning percentage.

In the 1920 game against Washburn University under coach Dwight Ream, Emporia State fullback Jack Reeves sustained a neck injury that resulted in his death. The 1922 season also saw the loss of player Don Davis (it is not known if Davis died from play or natural causes).

While at Kansas Normal, Hargiss coached the 1926 team to an undefeated season and outscored their opponents 144 to 3. The closest game of the season was a 6–0 battle against Hargiss's former team, the College of Emporia.

=== Kansas ===
From 1928 to 1932, Hargiss served as the head football coach at University of Kansas, compiling a record of 18–16–2. He was fired as football coach on October 10, 1932, two days after the Jawhawks lost at home to Oklahoma, 21–6. Hargiss was succeeded by assistant coach Adrian Lindsey.

== Football developments ==
=== Use of the huddle ===
Oregon Agricultural College was one of the first schools nationally to use the huddle formation in a game. It happened against the University of Washington in Seattle in 1918. Hargiss instructed the starters that once they returned to the field, they were to stand 10 yards behind the ball before the beginning of each play and whisper to one another what they were going to do next.

An eyewitness to the game was veteran Seattle sports columnist Royal Brougham, whose stories of the contest give testimony today to OSU's early use of this pioneering new formation.

=== Forward pass ===
While coaching at the College of Emporia, Hargiss would regularly use the forward pass and records show that it was used as early as 1910, three years before Knute Rockne began to regularly call the play.

== Honors and legacy ==
- Charter Inductee Kansas Sports Hall of Fame 1961.
- Inducted into the NAIA Track and Field Hall of Fame.
- One of the first coaches to use forward pass, unbalanced line, and huddle.
- Head football and track and field coach at KU for 5 and 10 years respectively. Football conference champions in 1930.
- Coached five world record holders in track: John Kuck, Glenn Cunningham, Jim Bausch, Clyde Coffman and Peter Mehringer.
- His 1926 football team at Kansas State Teachers College, Emporia was undefeated and allowed only 3 points.
- Earned 16 college athletic letters at Kansas State Normal (Emporia State) participating in football, basketball, track and field, baseball, gymnastics and boxing and was named captain five times.
- He was a three-sport standout at Beulah High School in Beulah, Kansas.
- Was collegiate track coach of Senator Bob Dole

== Personal life ==
Hargiss graduated from Kansas Normal School in Emporia, Kansas. His brother, Floyd Daniel Hargiss was a football coach at Ottawa University in Ottawa, Kansas.

== Head coaching record ==
=== Football ===
Year	Team	Overall	Conference	Standing	Bowl/playoffs
College of Emporia Fighting Presbies (Kansas Collegiate Athletic Conference) (1910–1912)
1910	College of Emporia	5–3–1			
1911	College of Emporia	5–2			
1912	College of Emporia	7–1	6–1	2nd	
College of Emporia:		17–6–1			
Kansas State Normals (Kansas Collegiate Athletic Conference) (1914–1917)
1914	Kansas State Normal	5–1–1			
1915	Kansas State Normal	5–2–2	4–0–1	T–1st	
1916	Kansas State Normal	6–3–1	5–1–1	1st	
1917	Kansas State Normal	5–3–1	5–0–1	2nd	
Oregon Agricultural Aggies (Northwest Conference / Pacific Coast Conference) (1918–1919)
1918	Oregon Agricultural	2–4	NA / 0–2	NA / 5th	
1919	Oregon Agricultural	4–4–1	1–1 / 1–3	3rd / 6th	
Oregon Agricultural:		6–8–1	1–5		
Kansas State Normals/Teachers (Kansas Collegiate Athletic Conference) (1920–1927)
1920	Kansas State Normal	2–4–2	2–3–1	T–th	
1921	Kansas State Normal	6–1	6–1	2nd	
1922	Kansas State Normal	6–2	6–1	2nd	
1923	Kansas State Teachers	5–1–1	5–1–1	T–2nd	
1924	Kansas State Teachers	3–4–2	3–3–2	T–7th	
1925	Kansas State Teachers	4–3–1	3–2–1	T–5th	
1926	Kansas State Teachers	7–0	7–0	1st	
1927	Kansas State Teachers	7–0–1	6–0–1	T–1st	
Kansas State Normal/Teachers:		61–24–12			
Kansas Jayhawks (Big Six Conference) (1928–1932)
1928	Kansas	2–4–2	1–3–1	5th	
1929	Kansas	4–4	2–3	5th	
1930	Kansas	6–2	4–1	1st	
1931	Kansas	5–5	1–3	4th	
1932	Kansas	1–1 (Note: Hargiss was fired after two games and replaced by Adrian Lindsey.)	0–1		
Kansas:		18–16–2	8–11–1		
Total:		102–54–16			
National championship Conference title Conference division title or championship game berth
