= Arthur Mosse =

American football player and coach (1872–1956)

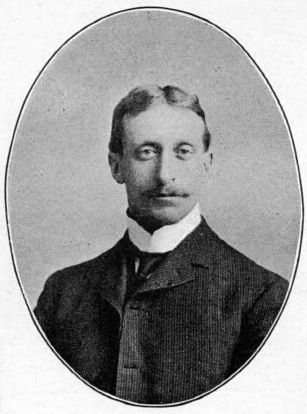
- Mosse as seen in 1905 as head football coach of what is now the University of Pittsburgh

Biographical details
- Born: March 29, 1872; Queenstown, Ireland
- Died: January 8, 1956 (aged 83); San Diego, California, U.S.

Playing career
- 1895–1898: Kansas
- Position: Guard

Coaching career (HC unless noted)
- 1899: Warrensburg Teachers
- 1902: Warrensburg Teachers
- 1903–1905: Western U. of Pennsylvania
- 1912–1913: Kansas
- 1918: Midland

Head coaching record
- Overall: 50–22–1

Arthur St. Leger "Texas" Mosse (March 29, 1872 – January 8, 1956) was an American football player and coach and the 9th head football coach of the Pittsburgh Panthers and the 13th head football coach for the University of Kansas Jayhawks. While at Pittsburgh, he coached the university to its first undefeated season (10–0) in 1904. Mosse also played professional football for the Homestead Library & Athletic Club in 1901.

== Early life and playing career ==
Mosse during his senior year as Captain of the 1898 KU football team.

Mosse was the youngest of five children born to Arthur Wellesley Mosse and Sophia Mosse (née Palmer) in Queenstown, Ireland. He emigrated with his family at the young age of 16 to Kansas City, Kansas, via New York City. He and his family soon moved on to Arkansas City, Kansas, where he went to high school. He quickly developed a strong interest in and started playing American football not long after arriving in Kansas. He moved to Leavenworth, Kansas, around 1890 where he lived and worked for several years in the furniture business. Mosse went on to play guard for the University of Kansas in Lawrence, Kansas, from 1895 to 1898, lettering all 4 years and was team captain his senior year in 1898. He met his wife, Ruth Stella Mosse (née Grover) (January 1877 – December 11, 1928), while attending the University of Kansas and they married on December 28, 1898, in St. Joseph, Missouri, during his last year at KU. After graduating from KU Mosse initially went back into the furniture business in Kansas City, Kansas, where his daughter Justine was born, before becoming a farmer in 1902 in his wife's native Kickapoo, Kansas, on the farm where she was born. The farm had been initially acquired by her father, Charles H. Grover, a prominent politician and lawyer in the early days of the state of Kansas.

== Pittsburgh ==
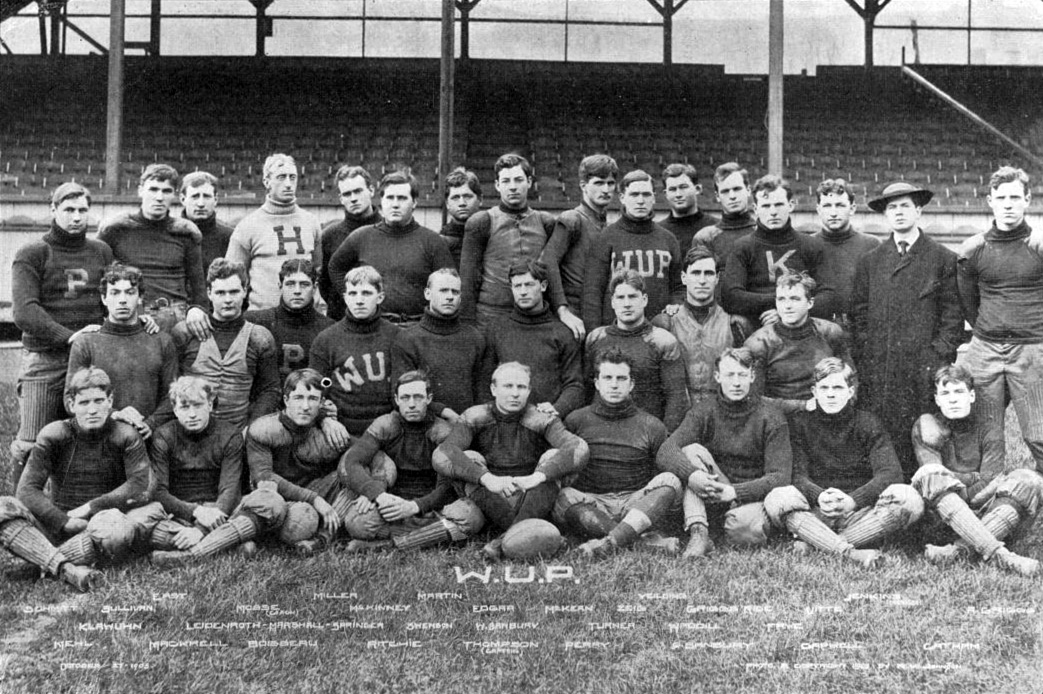
The 1905 football team of the University of Pittsburgh, then known as the Western University of Pennsylvania, was Mosse's last season as head coach in Pittsburgh. This team went 10–2 while outscoring its opponents 405–36. Joseph H. Thompson, center of the front row, was the team captain.

Mosse was brought to Pittsburgh from Kansas to become head coach at the Western University of Pennsylvania, now known as the University of Pittsburgh, or "Pitt", for the 1903 season. Following a disastrous 0-9-1 season that year, a decision was made by the alumni and university administration to be more supportive of the football program. Efforts were begun to recruit good football players, including six that were persuaded by Mosse to leave his former school of Kansas for Pittsburgh, along with others from Geneva College including Joe Thompson. In addition, money was raised to subsidize the program, including the funding of the team's first athletic dormitory and training table. Mosse also obtained an outright lease to play fall games in Exposition Park from Barney Dreyfuss, the owner of the Pittsburgh Pirates, for 20 percent of the gate receipts. What ensued was a dramatic one year turn around that the saw the University post a 10-0 record, its first undefeated season, in which it outscored opponents 406-5. With wins over Penn State and West Virginia, along with other regional schools, the university claimed the championship of the western part of the state and second place in the entire state behind the University of Pennsylvania, who with a 12-0 record, were considered the national champions that season. Media attention and attendance also grew tremendously with multiple newspaper articles and attendance at some games around 13,000.

The increased support and success of the football program under Mosse has been pin pointed as the start of "big football enterprise" at the University of Pittsburgh. However, during the winter following the 1904 season, controversy and scandal erupted when Joe Thompson sought to acquire Mosse's job as coach, combined with apparent complications with the Dean. However, things were settled in time for the 1905 season in which Mosse guided his team to a 10-2 record, outscoring opponents 405-36. However, by the 1906 E.R. Wingard had assumed coaching duties, and in 1908, Joe Thompson finally acquired the head coaching position he desired.

In total, Mosse held the head coaching position at Pittsburgh from 1903 to 1905 compiling a 20-11-1 record. While at Pitt, Mosse also helped coach the track and field team, was an instructor in gymnasium, and helped supervise early basketball teams at the university.

== Kansas ==
Mosse in 1913 as head football coach at Kansas

Mosse coached at his alma mater, the University of Kansas, for two seasons, from 1912 to 1913, compiling a record of 9–7.

== Later life ==
Mosse returned to farming his farm in Kickapoo, Kansas, in between his coaching jobs at Pitt and KU as well as later in 1914 when he retired from coaching. He came out of retirement for one year to coach at Midland College in Atchison, Kansas in 1918. He became well known throughout the state of Kansas and the country for breeding pure bred Chester White hogs as he exhibited them at twelve state fairs across the country. He remained on the farm, where his daughters Marion and Ruth were born, until 1924 when he and his wife moved to Van Nuys, California, to be near their daughter, Justine. Justine also attended the University of Kansas and had played on the first "mythical" varsity Kansas Jayhawks women's basketball team in the school's history in 1920 as a freshman. As women were not then allowed to play intercollegiate basketball the team was not technically an official varsity team being picked by the faculty and they only played intramural games against other women's organizations on campus. His wife, Ruth, died on December 11, 1928, in Los Angeles, California, whereupon Mosse moved in with his daughter, Justine also living in Van Nuys, California, at the time. Despite having lived in the United States for nearly 50 years, Mosse did not officially become a naturalized US citizen until January 8, 1937, in Van Nuys, California. Later in 1944 he and his daughter moved to San Diego, California, where Mosse died on January 8, 1956, at the home of his daughter. He was survived by his daughters Justine St. Leger Mosse (November 9, 1899 – May 11, 1986), Mrs. Marion Wellesley Russell (November 5, 1903 – November 22, 1994) and Ruth Grover Mosse (October 10, 1911 – 2003). Mosse was buried in Oak Hill Cemetery in Lawrence, Kansas, next to his wife.

== Head coaching record ==
Year	Team	Overall	Conference	Standing	Bowl/playoffs
Warrensburg Teachers (Missouri-Kansas Inter-State Conference) (1899)
1899	Warrensburg Teachers	5–1			
Warrensburg Teachers (Missouri-Kansas Inter-State Conference) (1902)
1902	Warrensburg Teachers	6–3			
Warrensburg Teachers:		11–4			
Western University of Pennsylvania (Independent) (1903–1905)
1903	Western University of Pennsylvania	0–9–1			
1904	Western University of Pennsylvania	10–0			
1905	Western University of Pennsylvania	10–2			
Western University of Pennsylvania:		20–11–1			
Kansas Jayhawks (Missouri Valley Intercollegiate Athletic Association) (1912–1913)
1912	Kansas	4–4	1–2	5th	
1913	Kansas	5–3	3–2	3rd	
Kansas:		9–7			
Total:		50–22–1			
