= 1912 College of Emporia Fighting Presbies football team =

American college football season

1912 College of Emporia Fighting Presbies football
- Conference: Kansas Collegiate Athletic Conference
- Record: 7–1 (6–1 KCAC)
- Head coach: Homer Woodson Hargiss (3rd season)

The 1912 College of Emporia Fighting Presbies football team was an American football team that represented the Emporia College during the 1912 college football season. The team's head coach was Homer Woodson Hargiss.

== Schedule ==
Date	Time	Opponent	Site	Result	Attendance	Source
September 27		Campbell (KS)	Emporia, KS	W 90–0		
October 4		Pittsburg Normal	Emporia, KS	W 71–0		
October 11	3:30 p.m.	at Fairmount	Fairmount Field; Wichita, KS	W 18–0		
October 19		at Baker	Baldwin City, KS	W 27–0		
October 28		at St. Mary's (KS)	St. Marys's, KS	W 15–0		
November 8		at Kansas State	Ahearn Field; Manhattan, KS	L 7–28		
November 15	3:30 p.m.	Kansas State Normal	?; Emporia, KS	W 30–3	2,500	
November 22		Haskell*	Emporia, KS	W 21–17		
*Non-conference game
