= 1912 Missouri Tigers football team =

American college football season

1912 Missouri Tigers football
- Conference: Missouri Valley Conference
- Record: 5–3 (2–3 MVC)
- Head coach: Chester Brewer (2nd season)
- Captain: Clarence P. LeMire
- Home stadium: Rollins Field

1912 Missouri Valley Conference football standings
| | Conf. | | | | | Overall |
| Team | W | | L | | T | W | | L | | T |
|---|---|---|---|---|---|---|---|---|---|---|
| Nebraska + | 2 | – | 0 | – | 0 | 8 | – | 1 | – | 0 |
| Iowa State + | 2 | – | 0 | – | 0 | 6 | – | 2 | – | 0 |
| Drake | 2 | – | 2 | – | 0 | 5 | – | 3 | – | 0 |
| Missouri | 2 | – | 3 | – | 0 | 5 | – | 3 | – | 0 |
| Kansas | 1 | – | 2 | – | 0 | 4 | – | 4 | – | 0 |
| Washington University | 0 | – | 2 | – | 0 | 4 | – | 4 | – | 0 |
+ – Conference co-champions

The 1912 Missouri Tigers football team was an American football team that represented the University of Missouri in the Missouri Valley Conference (MVC) during the 1912 college football season. The team compiled a 5–3 record (2–3 against MVC opponents), finished in fourth place in the conference, and outscored all opponents by a combined total of 135 to 69. Chester Brewer was the head coach for the second of three seasons. The team played its home games at Rollins Field in Columbia, Missouri.

== Schedule ==
| Date | Opponent | Site | Result | Attendance | Source |
|---|---|---|---|---|---|
| September 28 | Central (MO)* | Rollins Field; Columbia, MO | W 55–7 | | |
| October 12 | Missouri Mines* | Rollins Field; Columbia, MO | W 13–0 | | |
| October 19 | Iowa State | Rollins Field; Columbia, MO (rivalry) | L 0–29 | | |
| October 25 | at Oklahoma* | Boyd Field; Norman, OK (rivalry) | W 14–0 | | |
| November 2 | Nebraska | Rollins Field; Columbia, MO (rivalry) | L 0–7 | | |
| November 9 | at Drake | Des Moines, IA | W 17–14 | | |
| November 16 | Washington University | Rollins Field; Columbia, MO | W 33–0 | | |
| November 23 | at Kansas | McCook Field; Lawrence, KS (rivalry | L 3–12 | | |
*Non-conference game
