= 1912 Illinois Fighting Illini football team =

American college football season

1912 Illinois Fighting Illini football
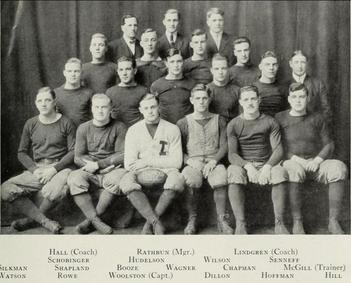
- Conference: Western Conference
- Record: 3–3–1 (1–3–1 Western)
- Head coach: Arthur R. Hall (7th season)
- Captain: William H. Woolston
- Home stadium: Illinois Field

1912 Western Conference football standings
	Conf.					Overall
Team	W		L		T	W		L		T
Wisconsin $	5	–	0	–	0	7	–	0	–	0
Chicago	6	–	1	–	0	6	–	1	–	0
Purdue	2	–	2	–	1	4	–	2	–	1
Minnesota	2	–	2	–	0	4	–	3	–	0
Northwestern	2	–	3	–	0	2	–	3	–	1
Illinois	1	–	3	–	1	3	–	3	–	1
Iowa	1	–	3	–	0	4	–	3	–	0
Indiana	0	–	5	–	0	2	–	5	–	0
$ – Conference champion

The 1912 Illinois Fighting Illini football team was an American football team that represented the University of Illinois during the 1912 college football season. In their seventh season under head coach Arthur R. Hall, the Illini compiled a 3–3–1 record and finished in sixth place in the Western Conference. Fullback/halfback William H. Woolston was the team captain.

== Schedule ==
Date	Time	Opponent	Site	Result	Attendance	Source
October 5		Illinois Wesleyan*	Illinois Field; Champaign, IL	W 87–3		
October 12	3:00 p.m	Washington University*	Illinois Field; Champaign, IL	W 13–0		
October 19		Indiana	Illinois Field; Champaign, IL (rivalry)	W 13–7		
November 2		at Minnesota	Northrop Field; Minneapolis, MN	L 0–13	9,000	
November 9		at Purdue	Lafayette, IN (rivalry)	T 9–9		
November 16		Chicago	Illinois Field; Champaign, IL	L 0–10	10,000	
November 23		at Northwestern	Sheppard Field; Evanston, IL (rivalry)	L 0–6		
*Non-conference game; All times are in Central time
