= Mark Mauer =

American football player and coach

Biographical details
- Born: c. 1960

Playing career

Football
- 1978–1981: Nebraska

Baseball
- 1982: Nebraska
- Position: Quarterback (football)

Coaching career (HC unless noted)

Football
- 1982–1983: Nebraska (GA)
- 1984–1986: Ball State (QB/WR)
- 1987–1989: Wisconsin (WR)
- 1996–1999: North Dakota State (AHC/OC)
- 2001–2003: New Mexico State (WR)
- 2004–2010: Concordia (MN)
- 2012: Hill-Murray HS (MN)

Head coaching record
- Overall: 40–39 (college)
- Bowls: 0–2

Accomplishments and honors

Championships
- 1 NCIS (2005)

Awards
- NCIS Coach of the Year (2005)

Mark Mauer (born c. 1960) is an American former football player and coach. He served as the head football coach at Concordia University in Saint Paul, Minnesota from 2004 to 2010, compiling a record of 40–39. As a college football player, Mauer was the starting quarterback at the University of Nebraska–Lincoln in 1981. Mauer is a cousin of professional baseball player Joe Mauer.

Mauer resigned from coaching high school football Hill-Murray School following being charged with prostitution; the charges were ultimately dropped and Mauer received one year of probation.

== Head coaching record ==
=== College ===
Year	Team	Overall	Conference	Standing	Bowl/playoffs
Concordia Golden Bears (Northern Sun Intercollegiate Conference) (2004–2010)
2004	Concordia	7–4	4–3	4th	
2005	Concordia	9–3	6–1	T–1st	L Mineral Water
2006	Concordia	5–6	4–4	T–3rd	
2007	Concordia	4–7	3–6	T–6th	
2008	Concordia	4–7	3–7 / 1–5	10th / 6th (South)	
2009	Concordia	3–8	3–7 / 2–4	10th / 5th (South)	
2010	Concordia	8–4	7–3 / 4–2	4th / 3rd (South)	L Mineral Water
Concordia:		40–39	30–31		
Total:		40–39			
National championship Conference title Conference division title or championship game berth
