= 1912 Chicago Maroons football team =

American college football season

1912 Chicago Maroons football
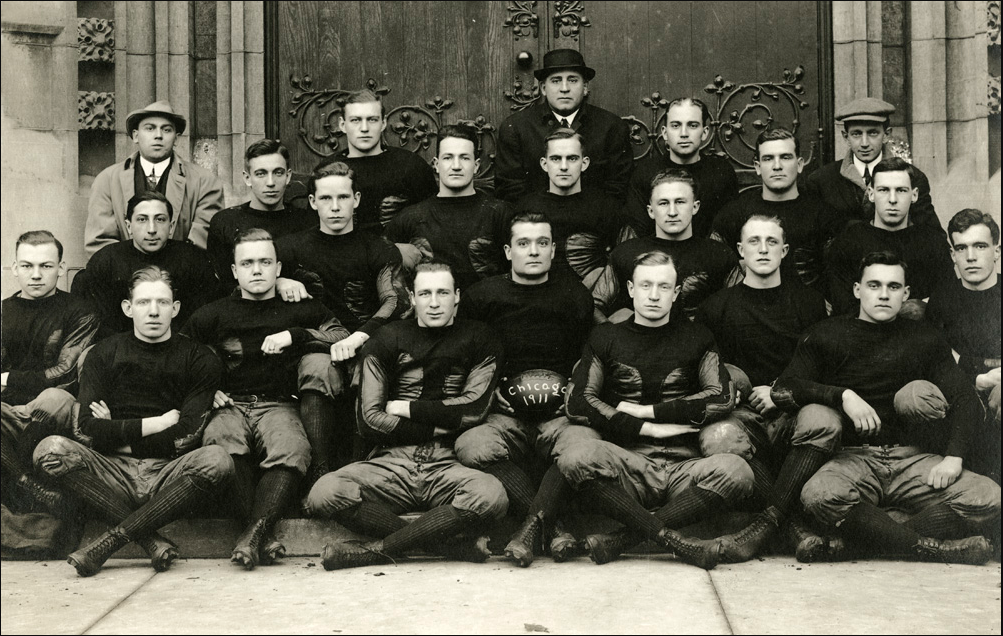
- Conference: Western Conference
- Record: 6–1 (6–1 Western)
- Head coach: Amos Alonzo Stagg (21st season)
- Captain: Halstead Marvin Carpenter
- Home stadium: Marshall Field

1912 Western Conference football standings
	Conf.					Overall
Team	W		L		T	W		L		T
Wisconsin $	5	–	0	–	0	7	–	0	–	0
Chicago	6	–	1	–	0	6	–	1	–	0
Purdue	2	–	2	–	1	4	–	2	–	1
Minnesota	2	–	2	–	0	4	–	3	–	0
Northwestern	2	–	3	–	0	2	–	3	–	1
Illinois	1	–	3	–	1	3	–	3	–	1
Iowa	1	–	3	–	0	4	–	3	–	0
Indiana	0	–	5	–	0	2	–	5	–	0
$ – Conference champion

The 1912 Chicago Maroons football team was an American football team that represented the University of Chicago during the 1912 college football season. In their 20th season under head coach Amos Alonzo Stagg, the Maroons compiled a 6–1 record, finished in second place in the Western Conference, and outscored all opponents by a combined total of 86 to 44.

== Schedule ==
Date	Opponent	Site	Result	Attendance	Source
October 5	Indiana	Marshall Field; Chicago, IL	W 13–0		
October 19	Iowa	Marshall Field; Chicago, IL	W 34–14		
October 26	Purdue	Marshall Field; Chicago, IL (rivalry)	W 7–0		
November 2	at Wisconsin	Randall Field; Madison, WI	L 12–30		
November 9	Northwestern	Marshall Field; Chicago, IL	W 3–0		
November 16	at Illinois	Illinois Field; Champaign, IL	W 10–0	10,000	
November 23	Minnesota	Marshall Field; Chicago, IL	W 7–0	15,000	

== Roster ==
Player	Position	Weight
Halstead Marvin Carpenter (captain)	right halfback	176
John Bennett Canning	right guard	160
Kenneth G. Coutchie	halfback	165
Paul Des Jardien	center	192
Horace Charles Fitzpatrick	halfback	158
Clarence Preston Freeman	center	195
Lauriston W. Gray	left halfback	173
Harvey Louis Harris	left guard	175
Earl D. Huntington	right end	170
Walter Lee Kennedy	left halfback	171
Joseph Brown Lawler	quarterback	147
Nelson Norgren	right halfback	174
Norman C. Paine	quarterback	162
Stanley Robert Pierce	Fullback	175
Arthur G. Scanlon	right guard	182
Sanford Sellers, Jr.	left tackle	175
Marion L. Skinner	right end	158
William M. Smith	quarterback	147
John Vruwink	left end	168
Horace Whiteside	left guard	190
Nicolai B. Johnson	trainer

- Head coach: Amos Alonzo Stagg (21st year at Chicago)
