= 1912 Indiana Hoosiers football team =

American college football season

1912 Indiana Hoosiers football
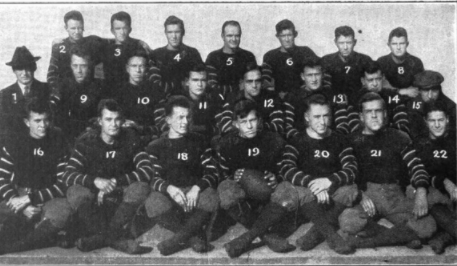
- Conference: Western Conference
- Record: 2–5 (0–5 Western)
- Head coach: James M. Sheldon (8th season)
- Captain: Floyd Flemming
- Home stadium: Jordan Field

1912 Western Conference football standings
	Conf.					Overall
Team	W		L		T	W		L		T
Wisconsin $	5	–	0	–	0	7	–	0	–	0
Chicago	6	–	1	–	0	6	–	1	–	0
Purdue	2	–	2	–	1	4	–	2	–	1
Minnesota	2	–	2	–	0	4	–	3	–	0
Northwestern	2	–	3	–	0	2	–	3	–	1
Illinois	1	–	3	–	1	3	–	3	–	1
Iowa	1	–	3	–	0	4	–	3	–	0
Indiana	0	–	5	–	0	2	–	5	–	0
$ – Conference champion

The 1912 Indiana Hoosiers football team was an American football team that represented Indiana University Bloomington during the 1912 college football season. In their eighth season under head coach James M. Sheldon, the Hoosiers compiled a 2–5 record, finished in last place in the Western Conference, and were outscored by their opponents by a combined total of 100 to 80.

== Schedule ==
Date	Time	Opponent	Site	Result	Attendance	Source
September 28		DePauw*	Jordan Field; Bloomington, IN	W 20–0		
October 5		at Chicago	Marshall Field; Chicago, IL	L 0–13		
October 19		at Illinois	Illinois Field; Champaign, IL (rivalry)	L 7–13		
October 26		Northwestern	Jordan Field; Bloomington, IN	L 7–20		
November 2		Earlham*	Jordan Field; Bloomington, IN	W 33–7		
November 9	2:30 p.m.	vs. Iowa	Washington Park; Indianapolis, IN	L 6–13	6,000	
November 23		at Purdue	Stuart Field; West Lafayette, IN (rivalry)	L 7–34		
*Non-conference game
