= 1912 Wisconsin Badgers football team =

American college football season

1912 Wisconsin Badgers football
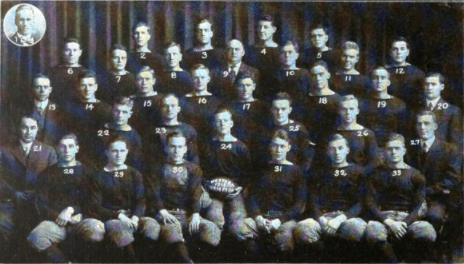

National champion (Billingsley) Western Conference champion
- Conference: Western Conference
- Record: 7–0 (5–0 Western)
- Head coach: William Juneau (1st season)
- Captain: Joseph Hoeffel
- Home stadium: Randall Field

1912 Western Conference football standings
| | Conf. | | | | | Overall |
| Team | W | | L | | T | W | | L | | T |
|---|---|---|---|---|---|---|---|---|---|---|
| Wisconsin $ | 5 | – | 0 | – | 0 | 7 | – | 0 | – | 0 |
| Chicago | 6 | – | 1 | – | 0 | 6 | – | 1 | – | 0 |
| Purdue | 2 | – | 2 | – | 1 | 4 | – | 2 | – | 1 |
| Minnesota | 2 | – | 2 | – | 0 | 4 | – | 3 | – | 0 |
| Northwestern | 2 | – | 3 | – | 0 | 2 | – | 3 | – | 1 |
| Illinois | 1 | – | 3 | – | 1 | 3 | – | 3 | – | 1 |
| Iowa | 1 | – | 3 | – | 0 | 4 | – | 3 | – | 0 |
| Indiana | 0 | – | 5 | – | 0 | 2 | – | 5 | – | 0 |
$ – Conference champion

The 1912 Wisconsin Badgers football team represented the University of Wisconsin as a member of the Western Conference during the 1912 college football season. Led by first-year head coach William Juneau, the Badgers compiled an overall record of 7–0 with a mark of 5–0 in conference play, winning the Western Conference title. The team's captain was Joseph Hoeffel. Tackle Bob Butler, a junior, was named by Walter Camp to the 1912 College Football All-America Team.

== Schedule ==
| Date | Time | Opponent | Site | Result | Attendance | Source |
|---|---|---|---|---|---|---|
| October 5 | | Lawrence* | Randall Field; Madison, WI | W 13–0 | | |
| October 12 | | Northwestern | Randall Field; Madison, WI | W 56–0 | | |
| October 19 | | Purdue | Randall Field; Madison, WI | W 41–0 | | |
| November 2 | | Chicago^{†} | Randall Field; Madison, WI | W 30–12 | | |
| November 9 | 2:30 p.m. | Arkansas* | Randall Field; Madison, WI | W 64–7 | 2,000 | |
| November 16 | | at Minnesota | Northrop Field; Minneapolis, MN (rivalry) | W 14–0 | 20,000 | |
| November 23 | | at Iowa | Iowa Field; Iowa City, IA (rivalry) | W 28–10 | | |
*Non-conference game; ^{†}Homecoming
