= Joe Dailey =

American football coach (born 1983)

Boston College Eagles
- Title: Wide receivers coach

Personal information
- Born: November 19, 1983 (age 43); Freehold Township, New Jersey, U.S.

Career information
- College: Nebraska (2003–2004); North Carolina (2005–2007)

Career history
- Buffalo (2008) Graduate assistant; Buffalo (2009) Tight Ends Coach; Kansas (2010) Recruiting coordinator; Bethune–Cookman (2011) Quarterbacks coach; Liberty (2012–2013) Quarterbacks coach; Liberty (2014–2018) Offensive coordinator & quarterbacks coach; New Mexico (2019) Offensive coordinator & quarterbacks coach; Boston College (2020–2021) Wide receivers coach; Carolina Panthers (2022) Wide receivers coach; Kansas (2023) Offensive analyst; Hampton (2024) Quarterbacks coach / pass game coordinator; Appalachian State (2025) Wide receivers coach; Boston College (2026) Wide receivers coach

Joe Dailey is an American football coach. He is currently the Wide Receivers Coach at Boston College. He has previously served as the offensive coordinator at Liberty, New Mexico, and the wide receivers coach for the Carolina Panthers of the National Football League (NFL).

Raised in Freehold Township, New Jersey, Dailey played prep football at St. Peter's Preparatory School in Jersey City, New Jersey and collegiately for Nebraska and North Carolina.

== College career ==
Dailey played quarterback for Nebraska and North Carolina, finishing his career with 3,458 yards and 26 touchdowns.

== Coaching career ==
Dailey began his coaching career as a graduate assistant at Buffalo for one season before being promoted to Tight Ends Coach his second year in coaching.

In 2010, Dailey served as a recruiting coordinator at Kansas.

In 2011, Dailey was hired as the quarterbacks coach at Bethune-Cookman.

From 2012 to 2013 Dailey was the quarterbacks coach at Liberty before being promoted to offensive coordinator in 2014, a job he would hold through 2018.

In 2019, Dailey was named the offensive coordinator of New Mexico.

From 2020 to 2021, Dailey was the wide receivers coach at Boston College. One of his pupils, Zay Flowers, would go on to be drafted in the first round by the Baltimore Ravens.

On February 14, 2022, Dailey was hired by head coach Matt Rhule as the wide receivers coach of the Carolina Panthers. In October he received significant media attention following an altercation with receiver Robbie Anderson that led to Dailey dismissing Anderson from the game. The Panthers would proceed to go 7-10 and finish 2nd in the NFC South division.

On April 3, 2023, it was announced that Dailey would return to Kansas as an offensive analyst.

In 2024, Dailey was hired as the quarterbacks coach and pass game coordinator for Hampton.

In 2025, Dailey was hired as an offensive assistant by Appalachian State Mountaineers football head coach Dowell Loggains. On April 1, 2025, it was reported that Dailey and App State football had agreed to part ways.
