= Jim Trickey =

American football player (1888–1913)

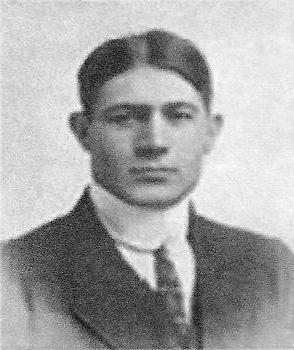

Profile
- Position: Tackle

Personal information
- Born: September 13, 1888; Iowa City, Iowa, U.S.
- Died: December 5, 1913 (aged 25); Iowa City, Iowa, U.S.

Career information
- College: Iowa

Awards and highlights
- Second-team All-American (1912)

James Trickey (September 13, 1888 - December 4, 1913) was an American football player for the University of Iowa. In 1912, he was selected as an All-American at the tackle position.

== Biography ==
Trickey was a native of Iowa Falls, Iowa. He played four years of football at Iowa Falls High School. Trickey enrolled at the University of Iowa and played on the freshman football team in 1909. He played for the school's varsity football team in 1910, 1911 and 1912. He was an All-State player all three years, an All-Western player two years, and an All-American as a senior in 1912.

In addition to schoolwork and football, Trickey "worked his way through the university ... by preaching in country churches." During two of his summers, he also served as a missionary in the Dakotas.

Prior to his senior year in 1912, Trickey announced that he would not play football, stating that he would spend his time on his studies. He was persuaded to return to the gridiron after "a petition was circulated and signed by practically the entire student body for his return." He was also unanimously elected as the president of the university's senior class.

At the end of the 1912 football season, Trickey was selected as a second-team All-American by Walter Camp, the highest postseason honor ever given by Camp to an Iowa player. Trickey was also selected as a first-team All-American by Alfred S. Harvey of the Milwaukee Free Press At the conclusion of the 1912 football season, The Iowa Alumnus magazine wrote: "All hats are off to 'Jim' Trickey, a player who exhibited the highest type of loyalty for his Alma Mater when after seven successive seasons of hard buffeting on the gridiron he listened to the pleas of his friends and consented to make a big sacrifice for Old Iowa, when he took the time and energy from heavy school work and outside employment to play through this last season. Trickey’s work was easily the feature of the year. He was the strong point in Iowa’s line on the defense and when called upon to carry the ball he repeatedly went through the strong opposing lines on long gains. He demonstrated early in his career his ability to puncture the strongest defense."

Trickey had five brothers who also played college football. In 1912, the Waterloo Evening Courier noted:

"With the selection of James Trickey of the 1912 Iowa football team as an All-Western tackle by Patterson of Collier's this week comes the story from Iowa Falls that the Trickey family will go down in history as one of this state's most remarkable families for the production of football players. The last of a line of six brothers went to Ellsworth college at Iowa Falls this year and is now playing freshman football there, the five preceding him, one of whom was Iowa's 'Jim' Trickey, having played their various periods at different schools of the state."

After completing his university studies in 1913, Trickey returned to Iowa Falls where he engaged in the insurance business as the district agent for "a big eastern life insurance company." He also became engaged in 1913 to Carrie Stanley of Adams County, Iowa.

Trickey died in December 1913. Trickey was traveling in Waterloo, Iowa when he became ill and was advised to return home. After returning to Iowa City, his condition worsened and an operation was performed that disclosed peritonitis. While some initial reports indicated that his death was "the ultimate result of an injury" sustained in the Iowa-Minnesota football game of 1912, the cause of death was ultimately determined to be an abscess that formed in his stomach on the opposite side from the football injury.

In what was described as "an unusual tribute," the flags on all of the college buildings at Iowa City were flown at half staff until after Trickey’s funeral. A tribute to Trickey was published The Iowa Yearbook for the Class of 1915 which included the following comments:

"It is difficult to describe adequately the imprint of this one life upon the lives of the undergraduates and alumni of the University of Iowa. 'Jim' gave the best that was in him to his school, whether in the Young Men’s Christian Association, the classroom, or on the gridiron. Trickey was a real man; he had real character; he possessed real friendships; he had real courage; he was real in every sense of the word. In every branch of life, Trickey showed genuine manhood."

== See also ==
- 1912 College Football All-America Team
