= 1912 Northwestern Purple football team =

American college football season

1912 Northwestern Purple football
- Conference: Western Conference
- Record: 2–3–1 (2–3 Western)
- Head coach: Charles Hammett (3rd season)
- Captain: Andrew N. Johnson
- Home stadium: Northwestern Field

1912 Western Conference football standings
	Conf.					Overall
Team	W		L		T	W		L		T
Wisconsin $	5	–	0	–	0	7	–	0	–	0
Chicago	6	–	1	–	0	6	–	1	–	0
Purdue	2	–	2	–	1	4	–	2	–	1
Minnesota	2	–	2	–	0	4	–	3	–	0
Northwestern	2	–	3	–	0	2	–	3	–	1
Illinois	1	–	3	–	1	3	–	3	–	1
Iowa	1	–	3	–	0	4	–	3	–	0
Indiana	0	–	5	–	0	2	–	5	–	0
$ – Conference champion

The 1912 Northwestern Purple team represented Northwestern University during the 1912 college football season. In their third and final year under head coach Charles Hammett, the Purple compiled a 2–3–1 record (2–3 against Western Conference opponents) and finished in fifth place in the Western Conference.

== Schedule ==
Date	Opponent	Site	Result	Source
October 5	Lake Forest*	Northwestern Field; Evanston, IL	T 0–0	
October 12	at Wisconsin	Randall Field; Madison, WI	L 0–56	
October 26	at Indiana	Jordan Field; Bloomington, IN	W 20–7	
November 2	Purdue	Northwestern Field; Evanston, IL	L 6–21	
November 9	at Chicago	Marshall Field; Chicago, IL	L 0–3	
November 23	Illinois	Northwestern Field; Evanston, IL (rivalry)	W 6–0	
*Non-conference game
