= 1912 Washington University Pikers football team =

American college football season

1912 Washington University Pikers football
- Conference: Missouri Valley Conference
- Record: 4–4 (0–2 MVC)
- Head coach: Frank Cayou (5th season)
- Captain: Vollmar
- Home stadium: Francis Field

1912 Missouri Valley Conference football standings
| | Conf. | | | | | Overall |
| Team | W | | L | | T | W | | L | | T |
|---|---|---|---|---|---|---|---|---|---|---|
| Nebraska + | 2 | – | 0 | – | 0 | 8 | – | 1 | – | 0 |
| Iowa State + | 2 | – | 0 | – | 0 | 6 | – | 2 | – | 0 |
| Drake | 2 | – | 2 | – | 0 | 5 | – | 3 | – | 0 |
| Missouri | 2 | – | 3 | – | 0 | 5 | – | 3 | – | 0 |
| Kansas | 1 | – | 2 | – | 0 | 4 | – | 4 | – | 0 |
| Washington University | 0 | – | 2 | – | 0 | 4 | – | 4 | – | 0 |
+ – Conference co-champions

The 1912 Washington University Pikers football team represented Washington University in St. Louis as a member of the Missouri Valley Conference (MVC) during the 1912 college football season. Led by Frank Cayou in his fifth and final season as head coach, the Pikers compiled an overall record of 4–4 with a mark of 0–2 in conference play, placing last out of six teams in the MVC. Washington University played home games at Francis Field in St. Louis.

== Schedule ==
| Date | Time | Opponent | Site | Result | Attendance | Source |
|---|---|---|---|---|---|---|
| October 5 | 3:00 p.m. | Shurtleff* | Francis Field; St. Louis, MO | W 47–7 | 1,200–1,800 | |
| October 12 | 3:00 p.m. | at Illinois* | Illinois Field; Champaign, IL | L 0–13 | | |
| October 19 | 3:00 p.m. | Westminster (MO)* | Francis Field; St. Louis, MO | W 54–0 | | |
| October 26 | 3:00 p.m. | Missouri Mines* | Francis Field; St. Louis, MO | W 13–6 | 2,000–5,000 | |
| November 2 | 2:45 p.m. | Drake | Francis Field; St. Louis, MO | L 13–33 | 4,000 | |
| November 9 | 2:45 p.m. | Drury* | Francis Field; St. Louis, MO | W 27–12 | 2,500 | |
| November 16 | | at Missouri | Rollins Field; Columbia, MO | L 0–33 | | |
| November 23 | 2:30 p.m. | Arkansas* | Francis Field; St. Louis, MO | L 7–13 | 2,500 | |
*Non-conference game
