= 1912 Purdue Boilermakers football team =

American college football season

1912 Purdue Boilermakers football
- Conference: Western Conference
- Record: 4–2–1 (2–2–1 Western)
- Head coach: Bill Horr (3rd season; first 3 games); Keckie Moll (remainder of season)
- Captain: Robert R. Hutchison
- Home stadium: Stuart Field

1912 Western Conference football standings
| | Conf. | | | | | Overall |
| Team | W | | L | | T | W | | L | | T |
|---|---|---|---|---|---|---|---|---|---|---|
| Wisconsin $ | 5 | – | 0 | – | 0 | 7 | – | 0 | – | 0 |
| Chicago | 6 | – | 1 | – | 0 | 6 | – | 1 | – | 0 |
| Purdue | 2 | – | 2 | – | 1 | 4 | – | 2 | – | 1 |
| Minnesota | 2 | – | 2 | – | 0 | 4 | – | 3 | – | 0 |
| Northwestern | 2 | – | 3 | – | 0 | 2 | – | 3 | – | 1 |
| Illinois | 1 | – | 3 | – | 1 | 3 | – | 3 | – | 1 |
| Iowa | 1 | – | 3 | – | 0 | 4 | – | 3 | – | 0 |
| Indiana | 0 | – | 5 | – | 0 | 2 | – | 5 | – | 0 |
$ – Conference champion

The 1912 Purdue Boilermakers football team was an American football team that represented Purdue University during the 1912 college football season. The Boilermakers compiled a 4–2–1 record, finished in third place in the Western Conference with a 2–2–1 record against conference opponents, and outscored their opponents by a total of 176 to 70. Robert R. Hutchison was the team captain.

After a 1–2 start, third-year head coach Bill Horr was dismissed for unspecified misconduct and replaced by backfield coach John E. "Keckie" Moll. Moll died of typhoid fever on the following Christmas Day.

== Schedule ==
| Date | Opponent | Site | Result | Source |
|---|---|---|---|---|
| October 5 | DePauw* | Stuart Field; West Lafayette, IN | W 21–0 | |
| October 19 | at Wisconsin | Randall Field; Madison, WI | L 0–41 | |
| October 26 | at Chicago | Stagg Field; Chicago, IL (rivalry) | L 0–7 | |
| November 2 | at Northwestern | Northwestern Field; Evanston, IL | W 21–6 | |
| November 9 | Illinois | Stuart Field; West Lafayette, IN (rivalry) | T 9–9 | |
| November 16 | Rose Polytechnic* | Stuart Field; West Lafayette, IN | W 91–0 | |
| November 23 | Indiana | Stuart Field; West Lafayette, IN (rivalry) | W 34–7 | |
*Non-conference game

== Roster ==
- John Berns, G
- Frank Hanna, E
- W. I. Herdrich, T
- Robert Hutchison, QB
- Herbert O'Brien, FB
- Alan Ogan, FB
- Elmer Oliphant, HB
- Jim Purdy, HB
- A. S. Rakestraw, E
- Van Ruffner, G
- B. C. Street, E
- W. I. Taylor, G
- C. S. Winston
