= John Faiman =

American football player (1941–2012)

Nebraska Cornhuskers
- Position: Quarterback

Personal information
- Born: June 24, 1941; Omaha, Nebraska, U.S.
- Died: June 16, 2012 (aged 70)

Career information
- High school: Omaha South
- College: Nebraska (1960–1962)

John Faiman (June 24, 1941 – June 16, 2012) of Omaha, Nebraska was a Nebraska Cornhuskers quarterback. A two-time All-American quarterback at Omaha South High School, Faiman played quarterback for the Huskers from 1960 to 1962, starting the first game of 1962 which also was the first game for new head coach Bob Devaney. Faiman was head coach of the Bellevue West High School Thunderbirds in Bellevue, Nebraska.

Faiman died on June 16, 2012, of a brain aneurysm at the age of 71.

== Early career ==
John Faiman was a standout quarterback for Omaha South High School. He was selected as a Senior Scholastic Magazine All-American his junior year in 1958. As a senior in 1959 he was selected as a Teen Magazine All-American Midwest HC, guiding the Packers to a share in the state title; He also led the Nebraska high school Shrine Bowl South team to a 7–6 victory over the North team at Rosenblatt Stadium in Omaha, Nebraska.

== College career ==
Faiman began his college career in 1960 at the University of Nebraska during the tenure of head coach, Bill Jennings. In his junior year in 1962 Faiman started as quarterback for head coach Bob Devaney's first game and season home opener with a 53–0 win over the University of South Dakota. That same year as PAT kicker, he broke his right leg in practice in early November ending his Nebraska playing career. Faiman wore numbers 11, 21, 15 during the years 1960, 1961 and 1962, respectively.

=== Playing statistics ===
1962

Passing: 11 attempts, 5 completions, 1 interception (.455) for 63 yards, (5.7 avg.).

Rushing: 5 attempts, (7 yards gain/30 yard loss) net of -23 yards, (-4.6 avg.)

Total Offense: 16 plays, 40 yards, (2.5 avg.).

Scoring: PAT kicks 10 attempts/7 made; PAT pass 1 attempt/0 made, (7 total).

== Coaching career ==
After college Faiman began coaching in the late 1960s. In 1968, he was coaching high school football in David City, Nebraska, and served as assistant coach at the 1968 Nebraska (high school) Shrine Bowl. By 1976 he returned to his alma mater, Omaha South High School, as head football coach.

In 1977 Faiman was an assistant coach at Washington State University under former Nebraska player Warren Powers. He next became the offensive line coach at University of Missouri from 1978 to 1983 under Powers. Faiman also has been a line coach at the University of Utah (1983–1984) and Kansas State University (1985). Regarding coaching college football, Faiman is quoted as saying: "Cletus Fischer (former Nebraska assistant coach) told me to get out of college football, because everyone was getting fired – I'm glad I did."

Faiman held the position of head football coach at Bellevue West High School in Bellevue, Nebraska since 1985, earning ten state playoff appearances. He has also served as past staff of Rimington Youth Football Camp (a football camp run by fellow Omaha South High School alum and Nebraska Cornhusker player Dave Rimington).

== Personal life ==
Fairman has two sons who played football at Bellevue West High School. One son, Kelly, played in the 1989 Nebraska Shrine Bowl, and the other, John, played fullback during Bellevue's 2005 season.
