= 1912 Minnesota Golden Gophers football team =

American college football season

1912 Minnesota Golden Gophers football
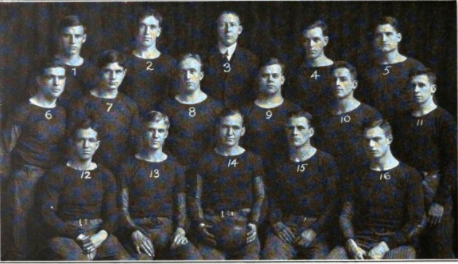
- Conference: Western Conference
- Record: 4–3 (2–2 Western)
- Head coach: Henry L. Williams (13th season)
- Captain: Paul Tobin
- Home stadium: Northrop Field

1912 Western Conference football standings
	Conf.					Overall
Team	W		L		T	W		L		T
Wisconsin $	5	–	0	–	0	7	–	0	–	0
Chicago	6	–	1	–	0	6	–	1	–	0
Purdue	2	–	2	–	1	4	–	2	–	1
Minnesota	2	–	2	–	0	4	–	3	–	0
Northwestern	2	–	3	–	0	2	–	3	–	1
Illinois	1	–	3	–	1	3	–	3	–	1
Iowa	1	–	3	–	0	4	–	3	–	0
Indiana	0	–	5	–	0	2	–	5	–	0
$ – Conference champion

The 1912 Minnesota Golden Gophers football team represented the University of Minnesota in the 1912 college football season. In their 13th year under head coach Henry L. Williams, the Golden Gophers compiled a 4–3 record (2–2 against Western Conference opponents) and outscored their opponents by a combined total of 87 to 38.

== Schedule ==
Date	Opponent	Site	Result	Attendance	Source
September 28	South Dakota*	Minneapolis, MN	L 0–10	3,500	
October 5	Iowa State*	Northrop Field; Minneapolis, MN	W 5–0	4,000	
October 19	Nebraska*	Northrop Field; Minneapolis, MN (rivalry)	W 13–0	10,000	
October 26	Iowa	Northrop Field; Minneapolis, MN (rivalry)	W 56–7	6,000	
November 2	Illinois	Northrop Field; Minneapolis, MN	W 13–0	9,000	
November 16	Wisconsin	Northrop Field; Minneapolis, MN (rivalry)	L 0–14	20,000	
November 23	at Chicago	Marshall Field; Chicago, IL	L 0–7	15,000	
*Non-conference game
