= Joseph Hoeffel (American football) =

American football player and coach (1890–1964)

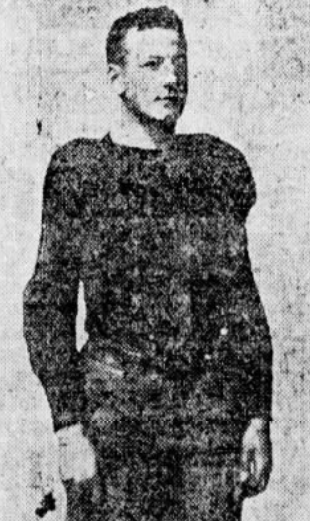
- Hoeffel with Wisconsin, c. 1910

Profile
- Position: End

Personal information
- Born: October 31, 1890; Green Bay, Wisconsin, U.S.
- Died: April 15, 1964 (aged 73); Green Bay, Wisconsin, U.S.
- Listed height: 5 ft 10 in (1.78 m)
- Listed weight: 150 lb (68 kg)

Career information
- High school: Green Bay East (WI)
- College: Wisconsin

Career history
- Nebraska (1913–1915) Assistant coach; Green Bay Packers (1921) Head coach

Awards and highlights
- Second-team All-American (1912); 2× All-Western (1911-1912)

Head coaching record
- Regular season: 3–2–1

Joseph Merrill Hoeffel (October 31, 1890 – April 15, 1964) was an American football player and coach who served as head coach of the Green Bay Packers in 1921. Historically, Curly Lambeau has been credited as being the Packers' that year, although this is primarily due to the different rules of American football in the early 1900s. In Hoeffel's era, the head coach was not allowed to communicate with the players while they were playing a game. Lambeau, as team captain, would call the plays during a game and also organized practices, tasks that are now allocated to the head coaching position.

Hoffel played college football for Wisconsin, being an All-America selection by Walter Camp in 1912. He played the end position.

== Early life and education ==
Hoeffel was born on October 31, 1890, in Green Bay, Wisconsin. He attended Green Bay East High School and was a "star player" for their football team. He was team captain as a senior. After graduating in 1908, he joined the University of Wisconsin.

Though he did not see much action as a freshman, Hoeffel became a varsity member in 1909, earning a letter. "Too small to capture a backfield spot at Wisconsin but too good to be ignored," he became an end. "Three physical qualities made him a great player," wrote Jack Rudolph of the Green Bay Press-Gazette. "He was fast, a deadly tackler, and he had a sense of timing that enabled him to get the jump on every play," the Press-Gazette reported.

Hoeffel continued as a letterman in the following two years, being named all-conference and all-western as a junior. He was named team captain as a senior, and earned the same honors again. He also was a second-team All-America selection by Walter Camp. The 1912 Wisconsin football team compiled an undefeated 7–0 record, winning the conference title.

== Coaching career ==
After graduating from the University of Wisconsin, Hoeffel became an assistant coach at Nebraska. He coached them for three years, before later assisting the staff of Green Bay East High School.

In 1921, Hoeffel served as the head coach of the Green Bay Packers, a professional team in the American Professional Football Association (APFA) (now National Football League). The team compiled a record of 3–2–1, and Hoeffel did not return to the team in 1922.

Historically, Curly Lambeau has been credited as being the Packers' in 1921, although this is primarily due to the different rules of American football in the early 1900s. In his era, the head coach was not allowed to communicate with the players while they were playing a game. Lambeau, as team captain, would call the plays during a game and also organized practices, tasks that are now given at the head coaching position.

In 2001, the Milwaukee Journal led an investigation studying the early Packers, finding through historical newspapers and Packer records that two coaches preceded Lambeau: Hoeffel and Willard Ryan. However, the Packers refused to recognize them as the head coaches. In an interview, Packers president Bob Harlan said, "He (Lambeau) ran everything. Now, what his title was and what a title meant at that particular time, I'm really not comfortable saying. But he was the one running the show. Considering what he did, I'm a little reluctant to take away any significance to his career."

== Later life and death ==
After his sports career, Hoeffel became a businessman, operating the Joseph M. Hoeffel Sales Co. in Green Bay. He died on April 15, 1964, at his home in Green Bay. He was 73 at the time of his death.
