= 1912 Iowa State Cyclones football team =

American college football season

1912 Iowa State Cyclones football

MVC co-champion
- Conference: Missouri Valley Conference
- Record: 6–2 (2–0 MVC)
- Head coach: Clyde Williams (6th season)
- Captain: R. L. "Buck" Hurst
- Home stadium: State Field

1912 Missouri Valley Conference football standings
	Conf.					Overall
Team	W		L		T	W		L		T
Nebraska +	2	–	0	–	0	8	–	1	–	0
Iowa State +	2	–	0	–	0	6	–	2	–	0
Drake	2	–	2	–	0	5	–	3	–	0
Missouri	2	–	3	–	0	5	–	3	–	0
Kansas	1	–	2	–	0	4	–	4	–	0
Washington University	0	–	2	–	0	4	–	4	–	0
+ – Conference co-champions

The 1912 Iowa State Cyclones football team represented Iowa State College of Agriculture and Mechanic Arts—now known as Iowa State University—as a member of the Missouri Valley Conference (MVC) during the 1912 college football season. Led by Clyde Williams in his sixth and final season as head coach, the Cyclones compiled an overall record of 6–2 with a mark of 2–0 in conference play, sharing the MVC title with Nebraska for the second consecutive year. As of 2025, this is the most recent time that Iowa State has won a conference title.

== Schedule ==
Date	Opponent	Site	Result	Attendance	Source
October 5	at Minnesota*	Northrop Field; Minneapolis, MN	L 0–5	4,000	
October 12	Simpson*	State Field; Ames, IA	W 24–7		
October 19	at Missouri	Rollins Field; Columbia, MO (rivalry)	W 29–0		
October 26	Grinnell*	State Field; Ames, IA	W 31–7		
November 2	Morningside*	State Field; Ames, IA	W 16–3		
November 9	at Cornell (IA)*	Mount Vernon, IA	W 21–0		
November 16	Iowa*^{†}	State Field; Ames, IA (rivalry)	L 7–20		
November 23	at Drake	Drake Stadium; Des Moines, IA	W 23–3		
*Non-conference game; ^{†}Homecoming
