= 1912 Nebraska Cornhuskers football team =

American college football season

1912 Nebraska Cornhuskers football
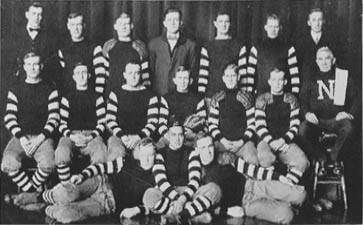

MVC co-champion Nebraska state champion
- Conference: Missouri Valley Conference
- Record: 7–1 (2–0 MVC)
- Head coach: Ewald O. Stiehm (2nd season)
- Home stadium: Nebraska Field

1912 Missouri Valley Conference football standings
	Conf.					Overall
Team	W		L		T	W		L		T
Nebraska +	2	–	0	–	0	8	–	1	–	0
Iowa State +	2	–	0	–	0	6	–	2	–	0
Drake	2	–	2	–	0	5	–	3	–	0
Missouri	2	–	3	–	0	5	–	3	–	0
Kansas	1	–	2	–	0	4	–	4	–	0
Washington University	0	–	2	–	0	4	–	4	–	0
+ – Conference co-champions

The 1912 Nebraska Cornhuskers football team represented the University of Nebraska as a member of the Missouri Valley Conference (MVC) during the 1912 college football season. The team was coached by second-year head coach Ewald O. Stiehm and played its home games at Nebraska Field in Lincoln, Nebraska.

On October 26, Nebraska defeated Adrian, beginning a 34-game unbeaten streak that lasted until November 18, 1916.

== Schedule ==
Date	Time	Opponent	Site	Result	Attendance	Source
October 5	3:00 p.m.	Bellevue* (Note: Now-defunct Bellevue College, not to be confused with present-day's Bellevue University)	Nebraska Field; Lincoln, NE	W 81–0		
October 12	3:00 p.m.	Kansas State*	Nebraska Field; Lincoln, NE (rivalry)	W 30–6		
October 19	2:30 p.m.	at Minnesota*	Northrop Field; Minneapolis, MN (rivalry)	L 0–13		
October 26	3:00 p.m.	Adrian*	Nebraska Field; Lincoln, NE	W 41–0		
November 2	2:30 p.m.	at Missouri	Rollins Field; Columbia, MO (rivalry)	W 7–0		
November 9	3:00 p.m.	Doane*	Nebraska Field; Lincoln, NE	W 54–6		
November 16	3:00 p.m.	Kansas^{†}	Nebraska Field; Lincoln, NE (rivalry)	W 14–3	7,000	
November 23	3:00 p.m.	Oklahoma*	Nebraska Field; Lincoln, NE (rivalry)	W 13–9		
*Non-conference game; ^{†}Homecoming

== Roster ==
Allen, E.D. C
Frank, Ernest HB
Freitag, Albert G
Halligan, Vic FB
Harman, Dewey RT
Howard, Warren E
Mastin, Guy E
McCormick LG
Mulligan, Harold E
Pearson, Monte LT
Potter, Herbert QB
Purdy, Leonard HB
Ross, Clinton RG
Swanson, Caesar LG
Towle, Max QB

Starters

Position	Player
Quarterback	Max Towle
Left Halfback	Leonard Purdy
Right Halfback	Ernest Frank
Fullback	Vic Halligan
Left End	Harold Mulligan
Left Tackle	Caesar Swanson
Left Guard	Albert Freitag
Center	E.D. Allen
Right Guard	Monte Pearson
Right Tackle	Dewey Harman
Right End	Guy Mastin

== Coaching staff ==
Coach	Position	First year	Alma mater
Ewald O. Stiehm	Head coach	1911	Wisconsin
Jack Best	Trainer	1890	Nebraska

== Game summaries ==
=== Bellevue ===
Bellevue at Nebraska

Team	1	2	Total
Bellevue			0
• Nebraska			81

- Date: October 5
- Location: Nebraska Field, Lincoln, NE
- Game start: 3:00 p.m.

This was the final meeting between Bellevue and Nebraska.

=== Kansas State ===
Kansas State at Nebraska

Team	1	2	Total
Kansas State			6
• Nebraska			30

- Date: October 12
- Location: Nebraska Field, Lincoln, NE
- Game start: 3:00 p.m.

=== At Minnesota ===
Nebraska at Minnesota

Team	1	2	Total
Nebraska			0
• Minnesota			13

- Date: October 19
- Location: Northrop Field, Minneapolis, MN
- Game start: 2:30 p.m.

Nebraska's defense fended off several long Minnesota drives in the first half, which ended scoreless. After a Minnesota touchdown to open the second half, Nebraska used a 72-yard run to get to Minnesota's three-yard line. However, an interception was returned for a second Gophers touchdown and NU was held scoreless for the rest of the game.

=== Adrian ===
Adrian at Nebraska

Team	1	2	Total
Adrian			0
• Nebraska			41

- Date: October 26
- Location: Nebraska Field, Lincoln, NE
- Game start: 3:00 p.m.

This was the only meeting between Adrian and Nebraska. Both teams played without regular starters due to injury. Three Nebraska starters were out; Harman, Meyer, and Potter. Five Adrian starters did not make the trip from Michigan due to injury leaving a total of 15 players.

Nebraska scored three touchdowns in the first half and sent in many replacements once it was obvious Adrian couldn't keep up. Local news reported that the forward pass was used frequently by both teams. Nebraska completed 4 of 10 attempts for 57 yards while Adrian completed 2 of 5 for 0 yards.

=== At Missouri ===
Nebraska at Missouri

Team	1	2	Total
• Nebraska			7
Missouri			0

- Date: November 2
- Location: Rollins Field, Colombia, MO
- Game start: 2:30 p.m.

=== Doane ===
Doane at Nebraska

Team	1	2	Total
Doane			6
• Nebraska			54

- Date: November 9
- Location: Nebraska Field, Lincoln, NE
- Game start: 3:00 p.m.

This was the final meeting between Doane and Nebraska.

=== Kansas ===
Kansas at Nebraska

Team	1	2	Total
Kansas			3
• Nebraska			14

- Date: November 16
- Location: Nebraska Field, Lincoln, NE
- Game start: 3:00 p.m.

=== Oklahoma ===
Oklahoma at Nebraska

Team	1	2	Total
Oklahoma			9
• Nebraska			13

- Date: November 23
- Location: Nebraska Field, Lincoln, NE
- Game start: 3:00 p.m.

This was the first meeting in what would become one of college football's most storied rivalries.
