= Max Towle =

American football player and coach (1889–1969)

Biographical details
- Born: September 9, 1889
- Died: April 27, 1969 (aged 79)

Playing career
- 1912–1913: Nebraska
- Position: Quarterback

Coaching career (HC unless noted)
- 1914–1915: Hastings

Maxwell G. Towle (September 9, 1889 – April 27, 1969) was an American football player and coach. He served as the head football coach at Hastings College in Hastings, Nebraska from 1914 to 1915. Towle was the starting quarterback at the University of Nebraska from 1912 to 1913, leading the 1913 Cornhuskers to an undefeated record in his senior season.
