= 1925 Wabash Little Giants football team =

American college football season

1925 Wabash Little Giants football
- Conference: Independent
- Record: 5–3–1
- Head coach: Robert E. Vaughan (7th season)

1925 Midwestern college football independents records
	Conf.			Overall
Team	W	L	T	W		L		T
Northern Illinois State		–		6	–	1	–	0
Dayton		–		7	–	2	–	0
Marquette		–		7	–	2	–	0
Notre Dame		–		7	–	2	–	1
Haskell		–		9	–	3	–	1
Western State Normal		–		6	–	2	–	1
Loyola (IL)		–		6	–	2	–	0
Central Michigan		–		4	–	1	–	3
Adrian		–		6	–	3	–	0
Butler		–		5	–	2	–	2
Michigan Mines		–		2	–	1	–	0
Detroit City College		–		4	–	3	–	1
Detroit		–		5	–	4	–	0
Assumption (ON)		–		3	–	3	–	1
Kent State		–		1	–	1	–	3
Michigan State		–		3	–	5	–	0
Muncie Normal		–		2	–	5	–	0
John Carroll		–		2	–	6	–	1
Saint Louis		–		2	–	6	–	1
Valparaiso		–		1	–	6	–	0

The 1925 Wabash Little Giants football team was an American football team that represented Wabash College as an independent during the 1925 college football season. In its seventh season under head coach Robert E. Vaughan, Wabash compiled a 5–3–1 record. Its three losses were to Big Ten Conference opponents Minnesota, Iowa, and Illinois. One of its victories was against Big Ten opponent Purdue.

== Schedule ==
Date	Opponent	Site	Result	Attendance	Source
September 26	Hanover	Crawfordsville, IN	W 20–0		
October 3	at Purdue	Ross–Ade Stadium; West Lafayette, IN	W 13–7		
October 10	Ball Teachers	Crawfordsville, IN	W 67–0		
October 17	at Minnesota	Memorial Stadium; Minneapolis, MN	L 6–32	18,000	
October 24	at Butler	Irwin Field; Indianapolis, IN	T 0–0		
October 31	at Iowa	Iowa Field; Iowa City, IA	L 7–28		
November 6	Chicago YMCA College	Crawfordsville, IN	W 13–0		
November 14	at Illinois	Memorial Stadium; Champaign, IL	L 0–21	20,466	
November 21	DePauw	Crawfordsville, IN	W 22–0		
