= List of Midwest Conference football standings =

This is a list of yearly Midwest Conference football standings.

== Midwest Conference standings ==
=== Early history ===
1922 Midwest Conference football standings
| | Conf. | | | | | Overall |
| Team | W | | L | | T | W | | L | | T |
|---|---|---|---|---|---|---|---|---|---|---|
| Coe + | 2 | – | 0 | – | 0 | 7 | – | 0 | – | 0 |
| Lawrence + | 2 | – | 0 | – | 1 | 6 | – | 0 | – | 1 |
| Millikin + | 1 | – | 0 | – | 0 | 3 | – | 4 | – | 2 |
| Hamline | 2 | – | 1 | – | 0 | 4 | – | 2 | – | 1 |
| Carleton | 1 | – | 1 | – | 0 | 4 | – | 3 | – | 0 |
| Knox | 1 | – | 3 | – | 0 | 2 | – | 7 | – | 0 |
| Beloit | 0 | – | 1 | – | 1 | 3 | – | 3 | – | 1 |
| Cornell (IA) | 0 | – | 3 | – | 0 | 3 | – | 5 | – | 0 |
+ – Conference co-champions

1925 Midwest Conference football standings
| | Conf. | | | | | Overall |
| Team | W | | L | | T | W | | L | | T |
|---|---|---|---|---|---|---|---|---|---|---|
| Monmouth (IL) + | 1 | – | 0 | – | 1 | 7 | – | 0 | – | 2 |
| Carleton + | 1 | – | 0 | – | 0 | 6 | – | 1 | – | 0 |
| Cornell (IA) + | 3 | – | 0 | – | 1 | 6 | – | 0 | – | 2 |
| Beloit + | 3 | – | 0 | – | 0 | 6 | – | 2 | – | 0 |
| Lawrence | 2 | – | 1 | – | 0 | 4 | – | 3 | – | 0 |
| Coe | 2 | – | 2 | – | 0 | 3 | – | 5 | – | 0 |
| Ripon | 0 | – | 3 | – | 0 | 2 | – | 5 | – | 0 |
| Hamline | 0 | – | 3 | – | 0 | 2 | – | 6 | – | 0 |
| Knox | 0 | – | 3 | – | 0 | 2 | – | 6 | – | 0 |
+ – Conference co-champions

1923 Midwest Conference football standings
| | Conf. | | | | | Overall |
| Team | W | | L | | T | W | | L | | T |
|---|---|---|---|---|---|---|---|---|---|---|
| Beloit + | 4 | – | 0 | – | 0 | 6 | – | 1 | – | 1 |
| Carleton + | 2 | – | 0 | – | 0 | 5 | – | 2 | – | 0 |
| Lawrence | 2 | – | 1 | – | 1 | 4 | – | 3 | – | 1 |
| Knox | 2 | – | 2 | – | 0 | 5 | – | 4 | – | 0 |
| Coe | 1 | – | 1 | – | 0 | 6 | – | 2 | – | 0 |
| Cornell (IA) | 1 | – | 2 | – | 1 | 4 | – | 3 | – | 1 |
| Millikin | 0 | – | 1 | – | 0 | 4 | – | 5 | – | 0 |
| Ripon | 0 | – | 1 | – | 0 | 2 | – | 4 | – | 0 |
| Hamline | 0 | – | 3 | – | 0 | 4 | – | 3 | – | 0 |
+ – Conference co-champions

1934 Midwest Conference football standings
| | Conf. | | | | | Overall |
| Team | W | | L | | T | W | | L | | T |
|---|---|---|---|---|---|---|---|---|---|---|
| Monmouth (IL) + | 4 | – | 0 | – | 1 | 7 | – | 1 | – | 1 |
| Coe + | 3 | – | 0 | – | 1 | 5 | – | 1 | – | 2 |
| Carleton | 3 | – | 1 | – | 0 | 6 | – | 1 | – | 0 |
| Lawrence | 2 | – | 2 | – | 0 | 4 | – | 3 | – | 1 |
| Beloit | 2 | – | 2 | – | 1 | 3 | – | 3 | – | 1 |
| Cornell (IA) | 1 | – | 4 | – | 0 | 2 | – | 7 | – | 0 |
| Ripon | 0 | – | 2 | – | 1 | 0 | – | 5 | – | 2 |
| Knox | 0 | – | 4 | – | 0 | 0 | – | 8 | – | 0 |
+ – Conference co-champions

1924 Midwest Conference football standings
| | Conf. | | | | | Overall |
| Team | W | | L | | T | W | | L | | T |
|---|---|---|---|---|---|---|---|---|---|---|
| Cornell (IA) + | 3 | – | 0 | – | 1 | 6 | – | 0 | – | 1 |
| Knox + | 3 | – | 0 | – | 0 | 7 | – | 1 | – | 0 |
| Lawrence + | 1 | – | 0 | – | 1 | 4 | – | 1 | – | 1 |
| Coe | 2 | – | 2 | – | 0 | 3 | – | 4 | – | 1 |
| Ripon | 1 | – | 1 | – | 1 | 2 | – | 3 | – | 2 |
| Carleton | 1 | – | 2 | – | 0 | 5 | – | 2 | – | 0 |
| Beloit | 1 | – | 3 | – | 1 | 3 | – | 3 | – | 1 |
| Millikin | 0 | – | 1 | – | 0 | 4 | – | 4 | – | 0 |
| Monmouth (IL) | 0 | – | 1 | – | 0 | 5 | – | 4 | – | 1 |
| Hamline | 0 | – | 2 | – | 0 | 1 | – | 5 | – | 0 |
+ – Conference co-champions

=== Modern era ===
1998 Midwest Conference football standings
| | Conf. | | | Overall |
| Team | W | | L | W | | L |
|---|---|---|---|---|---|---|
| Grinnell $ | 9 | – | 0 | 10 | – | 0 |
| Beloit | 7 | – | 2 | 7 | – | 3 |
| Ripon | 7 | – | 2 | 7 | – | 3 |
| Knox | 6 | – | 3 | 6 | – | 4 |
| St. Norbert | 5 | – | 4 | 5 | – | 5 |
| Lake Forest | 4 | – | 5 | 4 | – | 6 |
| Carroll (WI) | 3 | – | 6 | 4 | – | 6 |
| Lawrence | 2 | – | 7 | 2 | – | 8 |
| Monmouth (IL) | 2 | – | 7 | 2 | – | 8 |
| Illinois College | 0 | – | 9 | 0 | – | 10 |
$ – Conference champion

1999 Midwest Conference football standings
| | Conf. | | | Overall |
| Team | W | | L | W | | L |
|---|---|---|---|---|---|---|
| St. Norbert $^ | 9 | – | 0 | 9 | – | 2 |
| Grinnell | 7 | – | 2 | 7 | – | 3 |
| Beloit | 6 | – | 3 | 7 | – | 3 |
| Ripon | 6 | – | 3 | 6 | – | 4 |
| Carroll (WI) | 4 | – | 5 | 5 | – | 5 |
| Lake Forest | 4 | – | 5 | 5 | – | 5 |
| Lawrence | 3 | – | 6 | 3 | – | 7 |
| Knox | 2 | – | 7 | 3 | – | 7 |
| Illinois College | 2 | – | 7 | 2 | – | 8 |
| Monmouth (IL) | 2 | – | 7 | 2 | – | 8 |
$ – Conference champion; ^ – NCAA Division III playoff participant

2000 Midwest Conference football standings
| | Conf. | | | Overall |
| Team | W | | L | W | | L |
|---|---|---|---|---|---|---|
| St. Norbert $^ | 9 | – | 0 | 10 | – | 1 |
| Ripon | 8 | – | 1 | 9 | – | 1 |
| Illinois College | 5 | – | 4 | 6 | – | 4 |
| Carroll (WI) | 5 | – | 4 | 5 | – | 5 |
| Grinnell | 5 | – | 4 | 5 | – | 5 |
| Beloit | 3 | – | 6 | 3 | – | 7 |
| Lake Forest | 3 | – | 6 | 3 | – | 7 |
| Monmouth (IL) | 3 | – | 6 | 3 | – | 7 |
| Knox | 2 | – | 7 | 2 | – | 8 |
| Lawrence | 2 | – | 7 | 2 | – | 8 |
$ – Conference champion; ^ – NCAA Division III playoff participant

2001 Midwest Conference football standings
| | Conf. | | | Overall |
| Team | W | | L | W | | L |
|---|---|---|---|---|---|---|
| Ripon + | 7 | – | 1 | 8 | – | 2 |
| St. Norbert +^ | 8 | – | 1 | 9 | – | 1 |
| Monmouth (IL) | 6 | – | 2 | 8 | – | 2 |
| Grinnell | 5 | – | 3 | 5 | – | 5 |
| Illinois College | 4 | – | 4 | 6 | – | 4 |
| Lake Forest | 4 | – | 4 | 5 | – | 5 |
| Beloit | 2 | – | 6 | 3 | – | 7 |
| Carroll (WI) | 2 | – | 6 | 2 | – | 7 |
| Knox | 2 | – | 6 | 2 | – | 7 |
| Lawrence | 1 | – | 7 | 2 | – | 8 |
+ – Conference co-champions; ^ – NCAA Division III playoff participant

2002 Midwest Conference football standings
| | Conf. | | | Overall |
| Team | W | | L | W | | L |
|---|---|---|---|---|---|---|
| St. Norbert +^ | 8 | – | 1 | 9 | – | 1 |
| Lake Forest +^ | 8 | – | 1 | 9 | – | 2 |
| Ripon | 7 | – | 2 | 7 | – | 3 |
| Beloit | 5 | – | 4 | 6 | – | 4 |
| Knox | 5 | – | 4 | 6 | – | 4 |
| Monmouth (IL) | 5 | – | 4 | 5 | – | 5 |
| Grinnell | 4 | – | 5 | 4 | – | 6 |
| Illinois College | 2 | – | 7 | 3 | – | 7 |
| Carroll (WI) | 1 | – | 8 | 1 | – | 9 |
| Lawrence | 0 | – | 9 | 0 | – | 10 |
+ – Conference co-champions; ^ – NCAA Division III playoff participant

2003 Midwest Conference football standings
| | Conf. | | | Overall |
| Team | W | | L | W | | L |
|---|---|---|---|---|---|---|
| No. 16 St. Norbert $^ | 9 | – | 0 | 11 | – | 1 |
| Monmouth (IL) | 8 | – | 1 | 8 | – | 2 |
| Lake Forest | 6 | – | 3 | 7 | – | 3 |
| Ripon | 5 | – | 4 | 6 | – | 4 |
| Beloit | 3 | – | 6 | 4 | – | 6 |
| Illinois College | 3 | – | 6 | 4 | – | 6 |
| Knox | 3 | – | 6 | 4 | – | 6 |
| Carroll (WI) | 3 | – | 6 | 3 | – | 7 |
| Lawrence | 3 | – | 6 | 3 | – | 7 |
| Grinnell | 2 | – | 7 | 3 | – | 7 |
$ – Conference champion; ^ – NCAA Division III playoff participant; Rankings from D3football.com

2004 Midwest Conference football standings
| | Conf. | | | Overall |
| Team | W | | L | W | | L |
|---|---|---|---|---|---|---|
| No. 22 St. Norbert $^ | 9 | – | 0 | 9 | – | 2 |
| Monmouth (IL) | 8 | – | 1 | 9 | – | 1 |
| Lake Forest | 7 | – | 2 | 8 | – | 2 |
| Grinnell | 5 | – | 4 | 6 | – | 4 |
| Illinois College | 5 | – | 4 | 6 | – | 4 |
| Ripon | 4 | – | 5 | 5 | – | 5 |
| Carroll (WI) | 3 | – | 6 | 3 | – | 7 |
| Beloit | 2 | – | 7 | 3 | – | 7 |
| Lawrence | 1 | – | 8 | 2 | – | 8 |
| Knox | 1 | – | 8 | 1 | – | 9 |
$ – Conference champion; ^ – NCAA Division III playoff participant; Rankings from D3football.com

2005 Midwest Conference football standings
| | Conf. | | | Overall |
| Team | W | | L | W | | L |
|---|---|---|---|---|---|---|
| Monmouth (IL) $^ | 9 | – | 0 | 10 | – | 1 |
| St. Norbert | 8 | – | 1 | 8 | – | 2 |
| Carroll (WI) | 6 | – | 3 | 6 | – | 4 |
| Ripon | 5 | – | 4 | 6 | – | 4 |
| Beloit | 5 | – | 4 | 5 | – | 5 |
| Lawrence | 4 | – | 5 | 4 | – | 5 |
| Knox | 3 | – | 6 | 4 | – | 6 |
| Lake Forest | 3 | – | 6 | 4 | – | 6 |
| Illinois College | 2 | – | 7 | 3 | – | 7 |
| Grinnell | 0 | – | 9 | 1 | – | 9 |
$ – Conference champion; ^ – NCAA Division III playoff participant

2006 Midwest Conference football standings
| | Conf. | | | Overall |
| Team | W | | L | W | | L |
|---|---|---|---|---|---|---|
| St. Norbert $^ | 9 | – | 0 | 10 | – | 1 |
| Monmouth (IL) | 7 | – | 2 | 7 | – | 3 |
| Ripon | 7 | – | 2 | 7 | – | 3 |
| Illinois College | 6 | – | 3 | 6 | – | 4 |
| Lake Forest | 5 | – | 4 | 5 | – | 5 |
| Lawrence | 4 | – | 5 | 5 | – | 5 |
| Carroll (WI) | 4 | – | 5 | 4 | – | 6 |
| Grinnell | 2 | – | 7 | 2 | – | 8 |
| Knox | 1 | – | 8 | 2 | – | 8 |
| Beloit | 0 | – | 9 | 1 | – | 9 |
$ – Conference champion; ^ – NCAA Division III playoff participant

2007 Midwest Conference football standings
| | Conf. | | | Overall |
| Team | W | | L | W | | L |
|---|---|---|---|---|---|---|
| St. Norbert $^ | 9 | – | 0 | 10 | – | 1 |
| Monmouth (IL) | 7 | – | 2 | 7 | – | 3 |
| Ripon | 7 | – | 2 | 7 | – | 3 |
| Carroll (WI) | 5 | – | 4 | 5 | – | 5 |
| Lake Forest | 5 | – | 4 | 5 | – | 5 |
| Illinois College | 4 | – | 5 | 4 | – | 6 |
| Lawrence | 4 | – | 5 | 4 | – | 6 |
| Knox | 2 | – | 7 | 3 | – | 7 |
| Beloit | 1 | – | 8 | 1 | – | 9 |
| Grinnell | 1 | – | 8 | 1 | – | 9 |
$ – Conference champion; ^ – NCAA Division III playoff participant

2008 Midwest Conference football standings
| | Conf. | | | Overall |
| Team | W | | L | W | | L |
|---|---|---|---|---|---|---|
| No. 16 Monmouth (IL) $^ | 9 | – | 0 | 11 | – | 1 |
| Ripon | 8 | – | 1 | 8 | – | 2 |
| St. Norbert | 7 | – | 2 | 7 | – | 3 |
| Carroll (WI) | 6 | – | 3 | 7 | – | 3 |
| Beloit | 4 | – | 5 | 5 | – | 5 |
| Illinois College | 4 | – | 5 | 4 | – | 6 |
| Lake Forest | 3 | – | 6 | 3 | – | 7 |
| Grinnell | 2 | – | 7 | 3 | – | 7 |
| Knox | 2 | – | 7 | 3 | – | 7 |
| Lawrence | 0 | – | 9 | 1 | – | 9 |
$ – Conference champion; ^ – NCAA Division III playoff participant; Rankings from D3football.com

2009 Midwest Conference football standings
| | Conf. | | | Overall |
| Team | W | | L | W | | L |
|---|---|---|---|---|---|---|
| No. 18 Monmouth (IL) $^ | 9 | – | 0 | 10 | – | 1 |
| St. Norbert | 8 | – | 1 | 9 | – | 1 |
| Ripon | 7 | – | 2 | 7 | – | 3 |
| Beloit | 5 | – | 4 | 6 | – | 4 |
| Carroll (WI) | 5 | – | 4 | 5 | – | 5 |
| Illinois College | 5 | – | 4 | 5 | – | 5 |
| Grinnell | 2 | – | 7 | 2 | – | 8 |
| Lake Forest | 2 | – | 7 | 2 | – | 8 |
| Lawrence | 1 | – | 8 | 2 | – | 8 |
| Knox | 1 | – | 8 | 1 | – | 9 |
$ – Conference champion; ^ – NCAA Division III playoff participant; Rankings from D3football.com

2010 Midwest Conference football standings
| | Conf. | | | Overall |
| Team | W | | L | W | | L |
|---|---|---|---|---|---|---|
| St. Norbert $^ | 7 | – | 2 | 7 | – | 4 |
| Carroll (WI) | 6 | – | 3 | 7 | – | 3 |
| Ripon | 6 | – | 3 | 7 | – | 3 |
| Monmouth (IL) | 6 | – | 3 | 6 | – | 4 |
| Grinnell | 5 | – | 4 | 6 | – | 4 |
| Beloit | 5 | – | 4 | 5 | – | 5 |
| Illinois College | 5 | – | 4 | 5 | – | 5 |
| Lake Forest | 2 | – | 7 | 2 | – | 8 |
| Lawrence | 2 | – | 7 | 2 | – | 8 |
| Knox | 1 | – | 8 | 1 | – | 9 |
$ – Conference champion; ^ – NCAA Division III playoff participant

2011 Midwest Conference football standings
| | Conf. | | | Overall |
| Team | W | | L | W | | L |
|---|---|---|---|---|---|---|
| No. 19 Monmouth (IL) $^ | 9 | – | 0 | 10 | – | 2 |
| Illinois College ^ | 8 | – | 1 | 9 | – | 2 |
| St. Norbert | 7 | – | 2 | 7 | – | 3 |
| Carroll (WI) | 6 | – | 3 | 7 | – | 3 |
| Ripon | 5 | – | 4 | 6 | – | 4 |
| Grinnell | 4 | – | 5 | 5 | – | 5 |
| Lake Forest | 3 | – | 6 | 3 | – | 7 |
| Beloit | 2 | – | 7 | 2 | – | 8 |
| Lawrence | 1 | – | 8 | 1 | – | 9 |
| Knox | 0 | – | 9 | 0 | – | 10 |
$ – Conference champion; ^ – NCAA Division III playoff participant; Rankings from D3football.com

2012 Midwest Conference football standings
| | Conf. | | | Overall |
| Team | W | | L | W | | L |
|---|---|---|---|---|---|---|
| Lake Forest + | 8 | – | 1 | 8 | – | 2 |
| St. Norbert +^ | 8 | – | 1 | 8 | – | 3 |
| Carroll (WI) | 7 | – | 2 | 8 | – | 2 |
| Illinois College | 7 | – | 2 | 8 | – | 2 |
| Monmouth (IL) | 5 | – | 4 | 5 | – | 5 |
| Ripon | 5 | – | 4 | 5 | – | 5 |
| Cornell (IA) | 4 | – | 5 | 4 | – | 6 |
| Grinnell | 2 | – | 7 | 2 | – | 8 |
| Knox | 2 | – | 7 | 2 | – | 8 |
| Lawrence | 2 | – | 8 | 2 | – | 8 |
| Beloit | 0 | – | 9 | 0 | – | 10 |
+ – Conference co-champions; ^ – NCAA Division III playoff participant

2013 Midwest Conference football standings
| | Conf. | | | Overall |
| Team | W | | L | W | | L |
|---|---|---|---|---|---|---|
| St. Norbert $^ | 8 | – | 1 | 8 | – | 3 |
| Illinois College | 7 | – | 2 | 8 | – | 2 |
| Lake Forest | 7 | – | 2 | 8 | – | 2 |
| Cornell (IA) | 7 | – | 2 | 7 | – | 3 |
| Ripon | 6 | – | 3 | 7 | – | 3 |
| Carroll (WI) | 5 | – | 4 | 6 | – | 4 |
| Monmouth (IL) | 5 | – | 4 | 5 | – | 5 |
| Grinnell | 2 | – | 7 | 2 | – | 8 |
| Beloit | 1 | – | 8 | 1 | – | 9 |
| Knox | 1 | – | 8 | 1 | – | 9 |
| Lawrence | 1 | – | 9 | 1 | – | 9 |
$ – Conference champion; ^ – NCAA Division III playoff participant

2014 Midwest Conference football standings
| | Conf. | | | Overall |
| Team | W | | L | W | | L |
|---|---|---|---|---|---|---|
North
| Macalester xy$^ | 5 | – | 0 | 9 | – | 2 |
| Carroll (WI) | 4 | – | 1 | 8 | – | 2 |
| St. Norbert | 3 | – | 2 | 6 | – | 4 |
| Ripon | 2 | – | 3 | 3 | – | 7 |
| Lawrence | 1 | – | 4 | 2 | – | 8 |
| Beloit | 0 | – | 5 | 3 | – | 7 |
South
| Illinois College xy | 5 | – | 0 | 7 | – | 3 |
| Monmouth (IL) | 4 | – | 1 | 8 | – | 2 |
| Cornell (IA) | 3 | – | 2 | 5 | – | 4 |
| Lake Forest | 2 | – | 3 | 4 | – | 6 |
| Grinnell | 1 | – | 4 | 3 | – | 7 |
| Knox | 0 | – | 5 | 2 | – | 8 |
Championship: Macalester 30, Illinois College 27
$ – Conference champion; x – Division champion/co-champions; y – Championship game participant; ^ – NCAA Division III playoff participant

2015 Midwest Conference football standings
| | Conf. | | | Overall |
| Team | W | | L | W | | L |
|---|---|---|---|---|---|---|
North
| St. Norbert xy$^ | 5 | – | 0 | 10 | – | 1 |
| Carroll (WI) | 4 | – | 1 | 6 | – | 4 |
| Ripon | 3 | – | 2 | 7 | – | 3 |
| Macalester | 2 | – | 3 | 4 | – | 6 |
| Beloit | 1 | – | 4 | 3 | – | 7 |
| Lawrence | 0 | – | 5 | 1 | – | 9 |
South
| Monmouth (IL) xy | 5 | – | 0 | 8 | – | 2 |
| Cornell (IA) | 3 | – | 2 | 5 | – | 5 |
| Illinois College | 3 | – | 2 | 5 | – | 5 |
| Lake Forest | 3 | – | 2 | 4 | – | 6 |
| Knox | 1 | – | 4 | 3 | – | 7 |
| Grinnell | 0 | – | 5 | 2 | – | 8 |
Championship: St. Norbert 16, Monmouth 7
$ – Conference champion; x – Division champion/co-champions; y – Championship game participant; ^ – NCAA Division III playoff participant

2016 Midwest Conference football standings
| | Conf. | | | Overall |
| Team | W | | L | W | | L |
|---|---|---|---|---|---|---|
| No. 21 Monmouth (IL) $^ | 8 | – | 0 | 10 | – | 1 |
| St. Norbert | 7 | – | 1 | 7 | – | 3 |
| Lake Forest | 6 | – | 2 | 8 | – | 2 |
| Macalester | 6 | – | 2 | 7 | – | 3 |
| Illinois College | 5 | – | 3 | 6 | – | 4 |
| Cornell (IA) | 4 | – | 4 | 5 | – | 5 |
| Beloit | 2 | – | 6 | 3 | – | 7 |
| Lawrence | 2 | – | 6 | 3 | – | 7 |
| Knox | 2 | – | 6 | 2 | – | 8 |
| Ripon | 2 | – | 6 | 2 | – | 8 |
| Grinnell | 0 | – | 8 | 0 | – | 10 |
$ – Conference champion; ^ – NCAA Division III playoff participant; Rankings from D3football.com

2017 Midwest Conference football standings
| | Conf. | | | Overall |
| Team | W | | L | W | | L |
|---|---|---|---|---|---|---|
North
| St. Norbert xy | 5 | – | 0 | 7 | – | 3 |
| Chicago | 3 | – | 2 | 6 | – | 4 |
| Macalester | 3 | – | 2 | 5 | – | 5 |
| Ripon | 3 | – | 2 | 5 | – | 5 |
| Lawrence | 1 | – | 4 | 2 | – | 8 |
| Beloit | 0 | – | 5 | 1 | – | 9 |
South
| Monmouth (IL) xy$^ | 5 | – | 0 | 9 | – | 2 |
| Lake Forest | 4 | – | 1 | 8 | – | 2 |
| Illinois College | 3 | – | 2 | 5 | – | 5 |
| Cornell (IA) | 2 | – | 3 | 4 | – | 6 |
| Knox | 1 | – | 4 | 5 | – | 5 |
| Grinnell | 0 | – | 5 | 1 | – | 9 |
Championship: Monmouth 9, St. Norbert 6
$ – Conference champion; x – Division champion/co-champions; y – Championship game participant; ^ – NCAA Division III playoff participant

2018 Midwest Conference football standings
| | Conf. | | | Overall |
| Team | W | | L | W | | L |
|---|---|---|---|---|---|---|
North
| No. 21 St. Norbert xy$^ | 5 | – | 0 | 10 | – | 2 |
| Chicago | 4 | – | 1 | 7 | – | 3 |
| Ripon | 3 | – | 2 | 7 | – | 3 |
| Macalester | 2 | – | 3 | 5 | – | 5 |
| Lawrence | 1 | – | 4 | 2 | – | 8 |
| Beloit | 0 | – | 5 | 1 | – | 9 |
South
| Monmouth (IL) xy | 5 | – | 0 | 8 | – | 2 |
| Lake Forest | 4 | – | 1 | 6 | – | 4 |
| Cornell (IA) | 2 | – | 3 | 5 | – | 5 |
| Illinois College | 2 | – | 3 | 4 | – | 6 |
| Knox | 2 | – | 3 | 2 | – | 8 |
| Grinnell | 0 | – | 5 | 2 | – | 8 |
Championship: St. Norbert 10, Monmouth 7
$ – Conference champion; x – Division champion/co-champions; y – Championship game participant; ^ – NCAA Division III playoff participant; Rankings from D3football.com

2019 Midwest Conference football standings
| | Conf. | | | Overall |
| Team | W | | L | W | | L |
|---|---|---|---|---|---|---|
North
| St. Norbert xy | 5 | – | 0 | 6 | – | 3 |
| Lake Forest | 4 | – | 1 | 7 | – | 3 |
| Ripon | 3 | – | 2 | 4 | – | 6 |
| Macalester | 2 | – | 3 | 4 | – | 6 |
| Beloit | 1 | – | 4 | 1 | – | 9 |
| Lawrence | 0 | – | 5 | 1 | – | 8 |
South
| Monmouth (IL) xy$^ | 4 | – | 0 | 7 | – | 3 |
| Chicago | 3 | – | 1 | 6 | – | 3 |
| Illinois College | 2 | – | 2 | 6 | – | 3 |
| Cornell (IA) | 1 | – | 3 | 4 | – | 5 |
| Knox | 0 | – | 4 | 3 | – | 6 |
| Grinnell * | 0 | – | 0 | 0 | – | 3 |
Championship: Monmouth 10, St. Norbert 7
$ – Conference champion; x – Division champion/co-champions; y – Championship game participant; ^ – NCAA Division III playoff participant; * – Grinnell canceled seven games, including all five divisional games.
