= 1925 Notre Dame Fighting Irish football team =

American college football season

1925 Notre Dame Fighting Irish football
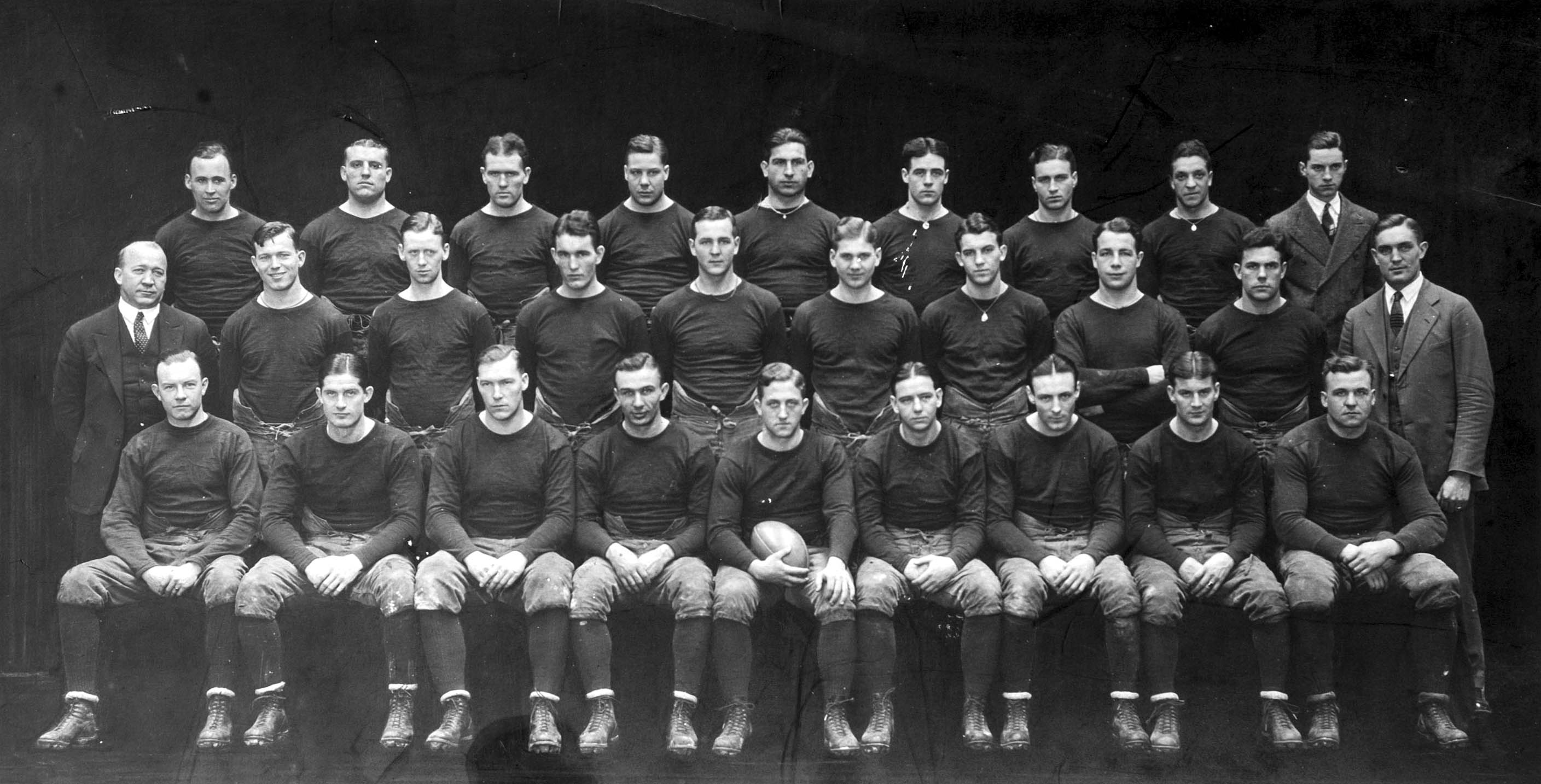
- Conference: Independent
- Record: 7–2–1
- Head coach: Knute Rockne (8th season)
- Offensive scheme: Notre Dame Box
- Base defense: 7–2–2
- Captain: Clem Crowe
- Home stadium: Cartier Field

1925 Midwestern college football independents records
	Conf.			Overall
Team	W	L	T	W		L		T
Northern Illinois State		–		6	–	1	–	0
Dayton		–		7	–	2	–	0
Marquette		–		7	–	2	–	0
Notre Dame		–		7	–	2	–	1
Haskell		–		9	–	3	–	1
Western State Normal		–		6	–	2	–	1
Loyola (IL)		–		6	–	2	–	0
Central Michigan		–		4	–	1	–	3
Adrian		–		6	–	3	–	0
Butler		–		5	–	2	–	2
Michigan Mines		–		2	–	1	–	0
Detroit City College		–		4	–	3	–	1
Detroit		–		5	–	4	–	0
Assumption (ON)		–		3	–	3	–	1
Kent State		–		1	–	1	–	3
Michigan State		–		3	–	5	–	0
Muncie Normal		–		2	–	5	–	0
John Carroll		–		2	–	6	–	1
Saint Louis		–		2	–	6	–	1
Valparaiso		–		1	–	6	–	0

The 1925 Notre Dame Fighting Irish football team was an American football team that represented the University of Notre Dame as an independent during the 1925 college football season. In its eighth season under head coach Knute Rockne, the team compiled a 7–2–1 record and outscored opponents by a total of 200 to 64. In games against major opponents, the Irish defeated Baylor, Minnesota, Georgia Tech, Carnegie Tech, lost to Army and Nebraska, and tied with Penn State.

Three Notre Dame players were recognized on Billy Evans' "National Honor Roll": tackle Stonewall McMannon; guard John "Clipper" Smith; and halfback Christie Flanagan. In addition, fullback Rex Enright received third-team honors on Walter Eckersall's 1925 All-America team. Enright also received first-team honors on Eckersall's 1925 All-Western college football team.

The team played its home games at Cartier Field in Notre Dame, Indiana.

== Schedule ==
Date	Opponent	Site	Result	Attendance	Source
September 26	Baylor	Cartier Field; Notre Dame, IN	W 41–0	13,000	
October 3	Lombard	Cartier Field; Notre Dame, IN	W 69–0	10,000	
October 10	Beloit	Cartier Field; Notre Dame, IN	W 19–3	6,000–10,000	
October 17	vs. Army	Yankee Stadium; Bronx, NY (rivalry)	L 0–27	65,000–80,000	
October 24	at Minnesota	Memorial Stadium; Minneapolis, MN	W 19–7	49,000–52,000	
October 31	at Georgia Tech	Grant Field; Atlanta, GA (rivalry)	W 13–0	12,000	
November 7	at Penn State	New Beaver Field; State College, PA (rivalry)	T 0–0	20,000	
November 14	Carnegie Tech	Cartier Field; Notre Dame, IN	W 26–0	26,000–27,000	
November 21	Northwestern	Cartier Field; Notre Dame, IN (rivalry)	W 13–10	27,000–32,000	
November 26	at Nebraska	Memorial Stadium; Lincoln, NE (rivalry)	L 0–17	41,000–45,000	

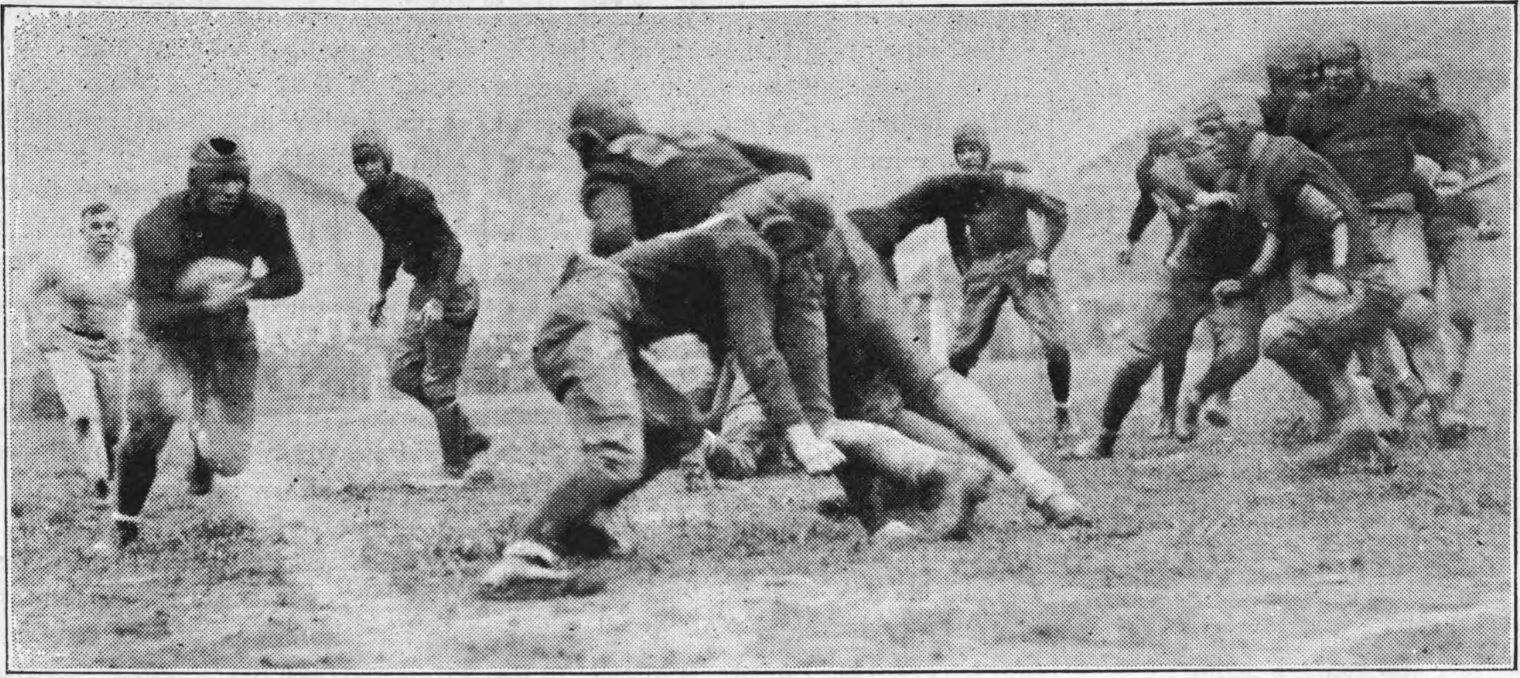
Christie Flanagan rushes during Notre Dame's game against Georgia Tech

== Personnel ==
=== Players ===
- Bud Boeringer, center, St. Paul, Minnesota
- Joe Boland, tackle, Philadelphia
- Francis "Lew" Cody, halfback, Lasalle, Illinois
- Clem Crowe, captain and left end, Lafayette, Indiana
- Red Edwards, quarterback, Weston, West Virginia
- Rex Enright, fullback, Rockford, Illinois
- Christie Flanagan, halfback, Port Arthur, Texas
- John "Freddy" Fredericks, center, Saginaw, Michigan
- Richard "Dick" Hanousek, guard/fullback, Antigo, Wisconsin
- Tom Hearden, halfback, Green Bay Wisconsin
- Ray Marelli, guard, Rockford, Illinois
- Frank Mayer, guard/tackle, Glencoe, Minnesota
- John "Stonewall" McManmon, tackle, Lowell, Massachusetts
- John "Big John" McMullen, tackle, Chicago
- Harry O'Boyle, halfback/fullback, Des Moines, Iowa
- Arthur "Count" Parisien, quarterback, Haverhill, Massachusetts
- Bull Polisky, tackle, Bellaire, Ohio
- Joseph "Flash" Prelli, halfback, Brentwood, California
- Joe Rigali, end, Oak Park, Illinois
- John "Cactus" Roach, halfback, Appleton, Wisconsin
- Clipper Smith, guard, Hartford, Connecticut
- Richard "Red" Smith, guard, Combined Locks, Wisconsin
- John "Ike" Voedisch, South Bend, Indiana
- John Wallace, end, Gary, Indiana
- Chile Walsh, end, Hollywood, California
- Elmer Wynne, fullback, Oronoque, Kansas

=== Coaching staff ===
- Head coach: Knute Rockne
- Assistant coaches: Hunk Anderson, Tom Lieb
- Freshman coach: George Keogan
- Assistant freshman coach: Wilbur Eaton
