= Greg Wallace (disambiguation) =

Greg (or Gregg) Wallace (or Wallis) may refer to:

- Greg Wallace (born c. 1948), American football coach
- Gregg Wallace (born 1964), English broadcaster and writer
- Greg Wallis (born 1990), politician in California
- Gregg Wallis (born 1982), baseball coach
