= 1925 Butler Bulldogs football team =

American college football season

1925 Butler Bulldogs football
- Conference: Independent
- Record: 5–2–2
- Head coach: Harlan Page (6th season)
- Captain: Louis Reichel
- Home stadium: Irwin Field

1925 Midwestern college football independents records
	Conf.			Overall
Team	W	L	T	W		L		T
Northern Illinois State		–		6	–	1	–	0
Dayton		–		7	–	2	–	0
Marquette		–		7	–	2	–	0
Notre Dame		–		7	–	2	–	1
Haskell		–		9	–	3	–	1
Western State Normal		–		6	–	2	–	1
Loyola (IL)		–		6	–	2	–	0
Central Michigan		–		4	–	1	–	3
Adrian		–		6	–	3	–	0
Butler		–		5	–	2	–	2
Michigan Mines		–		2	–	1	–	0
Detroit City College		–		4	–	3	–	1
Detroit		–		5	–	4	–	0
Assumption (ON)		–		3	–	3	–	1
Kent State		–		1	–	1	–	3
Michigan State		–		3	–	5	–	0
Muncie Normal		–		2	–	5	–	0
John Carroll		–		2	–	6	–	1
Saint Louis		–		2	–	6	–	1
Valparaiso		–		1	–	6	–	0

The 1925 Butler Bulldogs football team that represented Butler University as an independent during the 1925 college football season. In their sixth and final season under head coach Harlan Page, the Bulldogs compiled a record of 5–2–2 and shut out five of nine opponents. Butler played home games at Irwin Field in Indianapolis.

== Schedule ==
Date	Opponent	Site	Result	Attendance	Source
September 26	Earlham	Irwin Field; Indianapolis, IN	W 28–0		
October 3	DePauw	Irwin Field; Indianapolis, IN	T 6–6		
October 10	at Illinois	Memorial Stadium; Champaign, IL	L 13–16	40,000	
October 17	Franklin (IN)^{†}	Irwin Field; Indianapolis, IN	W 23–0		
October 24	Wabash	Irwin Field; Indianapolis, IN	T 0–0		
October 31	Rose Polytechnic	Indianapolis, IN	W 38–0		
November 7	at Minnesota	Memorial Stadium; Minneapolis, MN	L 7–33	20,000	
November 14	Dayton	Irwin Field; Indianapolis, IN	W 10–7		
November 21	at Centenary	Centenary Field; Shreveport, LA	W 9–0	5,000	
^{†}Homecoming
