= 1925 Loyola University Chicago football team =

American college football season

1925 Loyola University Chicago football
- Conference: Independent
- Record: 6–2
- Head coach: Roger Kiley (3rd season)

1925 Midwestern college football independents records
	Conf.			Overall
Team	W	L	T	W		L		T
Northern Illinois State		–		6	–	1	–	0
Dayton		–		7	–	2	–	0
Marquette		–		7	–	2	–	0
Notre Dame		–		7	–	2	–	1
Haskell		–		9	–	3	–	1
Western State Normal		–		6	–	2	–	1
Loyola (IL)		–		6	–	2	–	0
Central Michigan		–		4	–	1	–	3
Adrian		–		6	–	3	–	0
Butler		–		5	–	2	–	2
Michigan Mines		–		2	–	1	–	0
Detroit City College		–		4	–	3	–	1
Detroit		–		5	–	4	–	0
Assumption (ON)		–		3	–	3	–	1
Kent State		–		1	–	1	–	3
Michigan State		–		3	–	5	–	0
Muncie Normal		–		2	–	5	–	0
John Carroll		–		2	–	6	–	1
Saint Louis		–		2	–	6	–	1
Valparaiso		–		1	–	6	–	0

The 1925 Loyola University Chicago football team was an American football team that represented Loyola University Chicago as an independent during the 1925 college football season. In its third season under head coach Roger Kiley, the team compiled a 6–2 record and outscored opponents by a total of 70 to 39. The team played three of its home games at Loyola Field and one game each at Grant Park Stadium and Soldier Field.

== Schedule ==
Date	Opponent	Site	Result	Attendance	Source
September 26	at Marquette	Marquette Stadium; Milwaukee, WI	L 0–10		
October 10	Millikin	Loyola Field; Chicago, IL	W 12–0		
October 17	at St. Ambrose	LeClaire Field; Davenport, IA	W 13–0		
October 25	Dayton	Grant Park Stadium; Chicago, IL	W 6–2	10,000	
October 31	Lombard	Loyola Field; Chicago, IL	L 7–13		
November 14	at Saint Louis	St. Louis University Field; St. Louis, MO	W 13–7		
November 21	John Carroll^{†}	Loyola Field; Chicago, IL	W 13–7		
November 28	Haskell	Soldier Field; Chicago, IL	W 6–0	6,000	
^{†}Homecoming
