= 1925 Bradley Indians football team =

American college football season

1925 Bradley Indians football

IIAC co-champion
- Conference: Illinois Intercollegiate Athletic Conference
- Record: 9–0 (5–0 IIAC)
- Head coach: Alfred J. Robertson (6th season)
- Captain: "Doc" Ranes
- Home stadium: Tech field

1925 Illinois Intercollegiate Athletic Conference football standings
	Conf.					Overall
Team	W		L		T	W		L		T
Bradley +	5	–	0	–	0	9	–	0	–	0
Monmouth (IL) +	6	–	0	–	1	7	–	0	–	2
Millikin	5	–	0	–	1	6	–	1	–	1
McKendree	5	–	1	–	0	5	–	3	–	1
Lake Forest	2	–	1	–	0	5	–	2	–	0
Knox (IL)	2	–	1	–	0	2	–	6	–	0
St. Viator	3	–	2	–	0	5	–	3	–	1
Carthage	3	–	2	–	1	4	–	4	–	1
Augustana (IL)	4	–	3	–	1	4	–	3	–	1
Western Illinois	4	–	3	–	1	4	–	3	–	1
Eureka	5	–	4	–	0	5	–	4	–	0
Hedding	1	–	1	–	0	2	–	2	–	1
Shurtleff	3	–	4	–	1	4	–	5	–	1
Eastern Illinois	1	–	2	–	0	4	–	3	–	1
Lincoln (IL)	2	–	4	–	1	2	–	5	–	1
Illinois College	2	–	4	–	3	2	–	5	–	3
Mount Morris	1	–	2	–	0	2	–	5	–	0
Wheaton (IL)	1	–	5	–	0	1	–	7	–	0
Illinois State Normal	1	–	6	–	0	1	–	6	–	0
Illinois Wesleyan	0	–	5	–	1	1	–	6	–	1
Southern Illinois	0	–	2	–	0	0	–	5	–	1
Blackburn	0	–	2	–	0	0	–	3	–	0
North-Western College	0	–	6	–	0	1	–	6	–	0
$ – Conference champion

The 1925 Bradley Indians football team was an American football team that represented Bradley Polytechnic Institute (now known as Bradley University) during the 1925 college football season as a member of the Illinois Intercollegiate Athletic Conference (IIAC). In Alfred J. Robertson's sixth season as head coach, the team compiled a perfect record of 9–0 and shared the conference title with the Monmouth Fighting Scots. Bradley outscored its opponents 217 to 30 on the season.

Key players included right halfback Eddie "Red" Bland of Taylorville, Indiana. Halfback "Doc" Ranes was the team captain. Three Bradley players were selected as first-team players on the 1925 All-IIAC football team: Carlson at left end; Eugene McNaught at right guard; and Al DeCremer at left halfback.

== Schedule ==
Date	Opponent	Site	Result	Attendance	Source
September 26	at DePauw*	Greencastle, IN	W 10–3		
October 3	Western State Normal*	Tech field; Peoria, IL	W 6–2		
October 17	Chicago YMCA College*		W 55–7		
October 23	Illinois College	Tech field; Peoria, IL	W 30–0		
October 31	Augustana (IL)^{†}	Tech field; Peoria, IL	W 24–6		
November 6	St. Viator	Tech field; Peoria, IL	W 20–12		
November 14	at Illinois Wesleyan	Bloomington, IL	W 19–0		
November 21	Eureka	Tech field; Peoria, IL	W 46–0		
November 26	Lombard*	Tech field; Peoria, IL	W 7–0	5,000	
*Non-conference game; ^{†}Homecoming
