= Harry M. Bell =

American football and basketball coach

Biographical details
- Born: 1889; Winterset, Iowa, U.S.
- Died: February 17, 1949 (aged 60); Long Beach, California, U.S.
- Education: Drake (BS)

Coaching career (HC unless noted)

Football
- 1913: Fort Madison HS (IA)
- 1914: Burlington HS (IA)
- 1915–1918: North HS (IA)
- 1919: Drake (assistant)
- 1920–1923: Des Moines
- 1924–1929: Lombard
- 1930–1931: Butler
- 1932–1934: Corpus Christi HS (IL)
- 1935–1938: Illinois Wesleyan

Basketball
- 1920–1924: Des Moines
- 1932–1935: Corpus Christi HS (IL)
- 1935–1939: Illinois Wesleyan

Track
- c. 1934: Corpus Christi HS (IL)
- 1935–?: Illinois Wesleyan

Administrative career (AD unless noted)
- 1924–1930: Lombard
- 1930: Butler
- ?–1935: Corpus Christi HS (IL)
- 1935–1939: Illinois Wesleyan

Head coaching record
- Overall: 72–57–7 (college football); 51–31 (college basketball, Illinois Wesleyan only)

Accomplishments and honors

Championships
- Football; 3 IIAC (1924, 1929, 1936)

Harry M. Bell (1889 – February 17, 1949) was an American football, basketball, and track coach. He served in the head football coach at Des Moines University in Des Moines, Iowa from 1920 to 1923, Lombard College in Galesburg, Illinois in 1924 to 1929, Butler University in Indianapolis, Indiana from 1930 to 1931, and at Illinois Wesleyan University in Bloomington, Illinois from 1935 to 1938. Bell was also the head basketball coach at Illinois Wesleyan from 1935 to 1939, tallying a mark of 51–31.

In November 1932, Bell became the head football coach at Corpus Christi High School in Galesburg. He also taught English and served as the athletic director at Corpus Christi High School before he was hired by Illinois Wesleyan in 1935.

Bell was born in Winterset, Iowa. He died on February 17, 1949, at the age of 60, at a hospital in Long Beach, California.

== Head coaching record ==
=== College football ===
Year	Team	Overall	Conference	Standing	Bowl/playoffs
Des Moines Tigers (Independent) (1920–1921)
1920	Des Moines	7–2			
1921	Des Moines	5–3			
Des Moines Tigers (North Central Conference) (1922–1923)
1922	Des Moines	4–2–1	0–1–1	T–6th	
1923	Des Moines	5–4–1	2–1–1	3rd	
Des Moines:		21–11–2	2–2–2		
Lombard Olive (Illinois Intercollegiate Athletic Conference) (1924)
1924	Lombard	5–4	5–0	1st	
Lombard Olive (Independent) (1925–1928)
1925	Lombard	3–5			
1926	Lombard	5–3			
1927	Lombard	4–4			
1928	Lombard	3–4–1			
Lombard Olive (Illinois Intercollegiate Athletic Conference) (1929)
1929	Lombard	6–1–1	3–0	T–1st	
Lombard:		26–21–2	8–0		
Butler Bulldogs (Indiana Intercollegiate Conference) (1930–1931)
1930	Butler	2–7			
1931	Butler	3–5			
Butler:		5–12			
Illinois Wesleyan Titans (Illinois Intercollegiate Athletic Conference) (1935–1937)
1935	Illinois Wesleyan	7–3	4–1	T–5th	
1936	Illinois Wesleyan	5–3–1	5–0–1	T–1st	
1937	Illinois Wesleyan	5–3–1	3–2–1	T–9th	
Illinois Wesleyan Titans (Illinois College Conference) (1938)
1938	Illinois Wesleyan	3–4–1	2–1	T–3rd	
Illinois Wesleyan:		20–13–3	14–4–2		
Total:		72–57–7			
National championship Conference title Conference division title or championship game berth
