= 1934 Arkansas State Indians football team =

American college football season

1934 Arkansas State Indians football
- Conference: Arkansas Intercollegiate Conference
- Record: 2–5–1 (2–3–1 AIC)
- Head coach: Tommy Mills (1st season)
- Home stadium: Kays Field

The 1934 Arkansas State Indians football team represented Arkansas State College—now known as Arkansas State University—as a member of the Arkansas Intercollegiate Conference (AIC) during the 1934 college football season. Led by first-year head coach Tommy Mills, the Indians compiled an overall record of 2–5–1 with a mark of 2–3–1 in conference play.

== Schedule ==
Date	Time	Opponent	Site	Result	Source
September 29		at Tennessee Tech*	Cookeville, TN	L 0–6	
October 13	2:30 p.m.	at West Tennessee State Teachers*	Memorial Field; Memphis, TN	L 0–18	
October 19		Hendrix	Kays Field; Jonesboro, AR	W 6–0	
October 27		at Arkansas State Teachers	Conway, AR	L 0–25	
November 2		Little Rock	Kays Field; Jonesboro, AR	T 0–0	
November 9		Arkansas A&M	Kays Field; Jonesboro, AR	W 19–0	
November 23		at Magnolia A&M	Magnolia, AR	L 6-19	
November 30		at Arkansas College	Batesville, AR	L 0–12	
*Non-conference game; All times are in Central time
