= Tommy Mills =

American football player & coach (1883–1944)

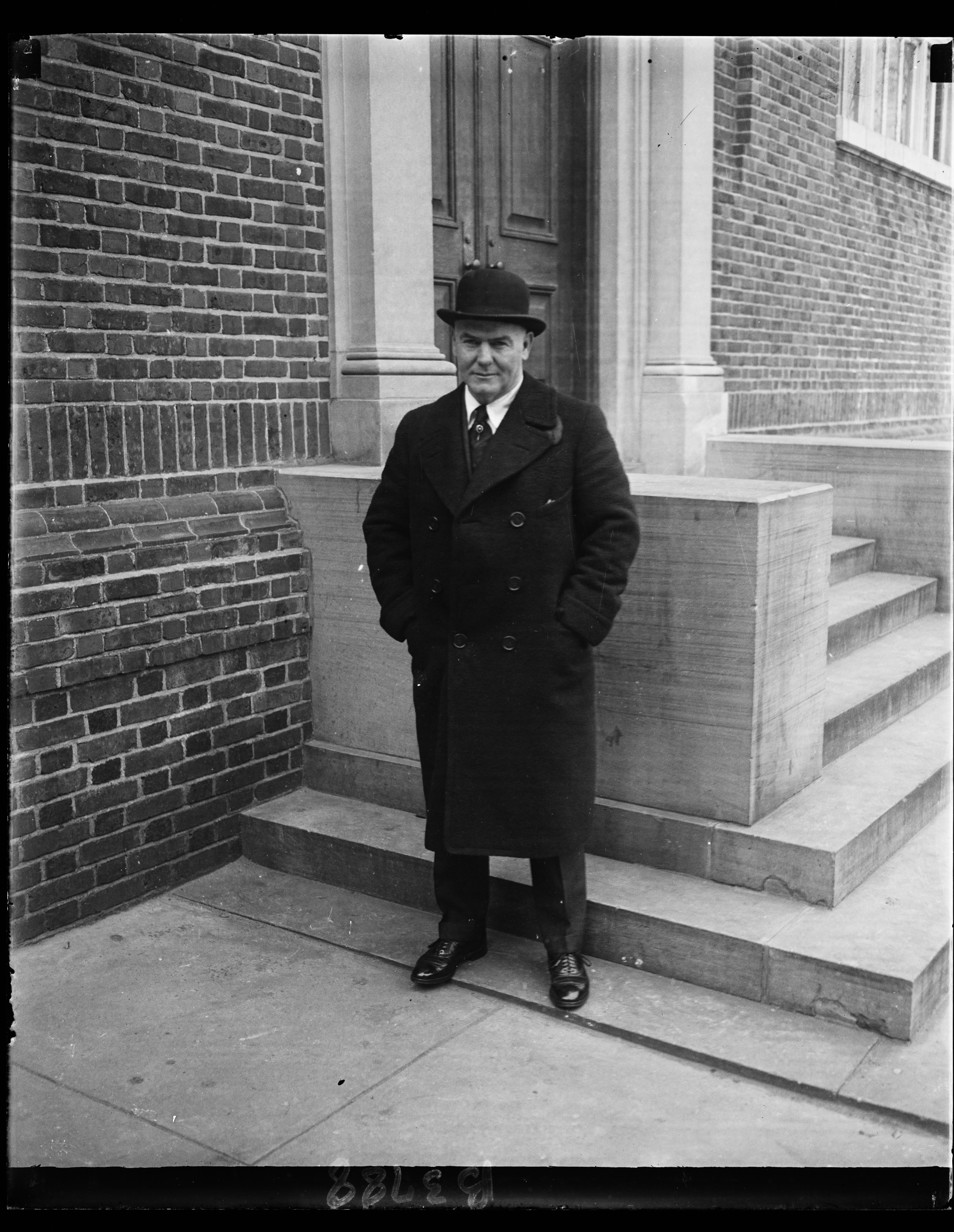

Biographical details
- Born: April 5, 1883; Beloit, Wisconsin, U.S.
- Died: February 25, 1944 (aged 60); Notre Dame, Indiana, U.S.

Playing career

Football
- c. 1904: Beloit
- Position: Halfback

Coaching career (HC unless noted)

Football
- 1915–1919: Omaha HS (NE)
- 1915–1919: Creighton
- 1920–1925: Beloit
- 1926–1929: Notre Dame (assistant)
- 1930–1932: Georgetown
- 1934–1935: Arkansas State

Basketball
- 1916–1920: Creighton
- 1920–1926: Beloit
- 1935–1936: Arkansas State

Baseball
- 1921–1924: Beloit
- 1927–1929: Notre Dame

Administrative career (AD unless noted)
- 1920–1926: Beloit
- 1934–1935: Arkansas State

Head coaching record
- Overall: 63–45–12 (college football); 119–41 (college basketball); 72–40–2 (college baseball)

Accomplishments and honors

Championships
- Football; 2 MWC (1923, 1925) Basketball; 2 MWC (1923–1924)

Thomas Emmet Mills (April 5, 1883 – February 25, 1944) was an American football player, coach of football, basketball, and baseball, and college athletics administrator. He served as the head football coach at Creighton University (1915–1919), Beloit College (1920–1925), Georgetown University (1930–1932), and Arkansas State College (1934–1935), compiling a career college football record of 63–45–12. Mills was the head baseball coach at the University of Notre Dame from 1927 to 1929, during which time he was also an assistant football coach at the school under Knute Rockne. In addition, Mills was the head basketball coach at Creighton (1916–1920), Beloit (1920–1926), and Arkansas State (1935–1936), amassing a career college basketball record of 119–41. Mills died at the age of 60 on February 25, 1944, of a heart attack at the Rockne Memorial Field House in Notre Dame, Indiana. He served as the director of the field house for the four years before his death.

== Head coaching record ==
=== College football ===
Year	Team	Overall	Conference	Standing	Bowl/playoffs
Creighton Blue and White (Independent) (1915–1919)
1915	Creighton	3–3–1			
1916	Creighton	4–1–2			
1917	Creighton	6–2–1			
1918	Creighton	3–0			
1919	Creighton	4–0–2			
Creighton:		20–6–6			
Beloit Gold (Independent) (1920–1921)
1920	Beloit	5–3			
1921	Beloit	5–2–1			
Beloit Gold / Blue Devils (Midwest Conference) (1922–1925)
1922	Beloit	3–3–1	0–1–1	7th	
1923	Beloit	6–1–1	4–0	T–1st	
1924	Beloit	3–3–1	1–3–1	7th	
1925	Beloit	6–2	3–0	T–1st	
Beloit:		28–14–4	8–4–2		
Georgetown Hoyas (Independent) (1930–1932)
1930	Georgetown	5–5			
1931	Georgetown	4–5–1			
1932	Georgetown	2–3 (Note: Mills resigned as head coach after five games. Jack Hagerty served as head coach for the final four games of the 1932 season, leading Georgetown to a record of 0–3–1. Georgetown finished the year with an overall record of 2–6–1.)			
Georgetown:		11–13–1			
Arkansas State Indians (Arkansas Intercollegiate Conference) (1934–1935)
1934	Arkansas State	2–5–1			
1935	Arkansas State	2–7			
Arkansas State:		4–12–1			
Total:		63–45–12			
National championship Conference title Conference division title or championship game berth

=== College basketball ===
Record table
Season	Team	Overall	Conference	Standing	Postseason
Creighton Bluejays (Independent) (1916–1920)
1916–17	Creighton	17–3			
1917–18	Creighton	11–0			
1918–19	Creighton	10–0			
1919–20	Creighton	15–3			
Creighton:		53–6			
Beloit Gold (Independent) (1920–1922)
1920–21	Beloit	5–8			
1921–22	Beloit	12–0			
Beloit Gold / Blue Devils (Midwest Conference) (1922–1926)
1922–23	Beloit	13–2	9–0	1st	
1923–24	Beloit	14–0	9–0	1st	
1924–25	Beloit	7–5	5–4	4th	
1925–26	Beloit	1–11	1–11	9th	
Beloit:		52–26	24–15		
Arkansas State Indians (Independent) (1935–1936)
1935–36	Arkansas State	14–9			
Arkansas State:		14–9			
Total:		119–41			
National champion Postseason invitational champion Conference regular season champion Conference regular season and conference tournament champion Division regular season champion Division regular season and conference tournament champion Conference tournament champion
