= 1925 Muncie Normal Hoosieroons football team =

American college football season

1925 Muncie Normal Hoosieroons football
- Conference: Independent
- Record: 2–5
- Head coach: Billy Williams (2nd season)
- Home stadium: Normal Field

1925 Midwestern college football independents records
	Conf.			Overall
Team	W	L	T	W		L		T
Northern Illinois State		–		6	–	1	–	0
Dayton		–		7	–	2	–	0
Marquette		–		7	–	2	–	0
Notre Dame		–		7	–	2	–	1
Haskell		–		9	–	3	–	1
Western State Normal		–		6	–	2	–	1
Loyola (IL)		–		6	–	2	–	0
Central Michigan		–		4	–	1	–	3
Adrian		–		6	–	3	–	0
Butler		–		5	–	2	–	2
Michigan Mines		–		2	–	1	–	0
Detroit City College		–		4	–	3	–	1
Detroit		–		5	–	4	–	0
Assumption (ON)		–		3	–	3	–	1
Kent State		–		1	–	1	–	3
Michigan State		–		3	–	5	–	0
Muncie Normal		–		2	–	5	–	0
John Carroll		–		2	–	6	–	1
Saint Louis		–		2	–	6	–	1
Valparaiso		–		1	–	6	–	0

The 1925 Muncie Normal Hoosieroons football team was an American football team that represented Muncie State Normal School (later renamed Ball State University) during the 1925 college football season. In its second and final season under head coach Billy Williams, the team compiled a 2–5 record and was outscored by a total of 132 to 58. The team played its home games at Normal Field in Muncie, Indiana.

== Schedule ==
Date	Opponent	Site	Result	Source
October 10	at Wabash	Ingalls Field; Crawfordsville, IN	L 0–67	
October 16	at Central Normal	Danville, IN	L 0–12	
October 24	Indiana Central^{†}	Normal Field; Muncie, IN	L 0–6	
October 30	at Manchester	North Manchester, IN	W 13–7	
November 6	Terre Haute Normal	Normal Field; Muncie, IN	L 7–20	
November 13	Merom College	Normal Field; Muncie, IN	W 32–0	
November 20	Earlham	Normal Field; Muncie, IN	L 6–20	
^{†}Homecoming
