= 1925 Haskell Indians football team =

American college football season

1925 Haskell Indians football
- Conference: Independent
- Record: 9–3–1
- Head coach: Dick Hanley (4th season)

1925 Midwestern college football independents records
| | Conf. | | | Overall |
| Team | W | L | T | W | | L | | T |
|---|---|---|---|---|---|---|---|---|
| Northern Illinois State | | – | | 6 | – | 1 | – | 0 |
| Dayton | | – | | 7 | – | 2 | – | 0 |
| Marquette | | – | | 7 | – | 2 | – | 0 |
| Notre Dame | | – | | 7 | – | 2 | – | 1 |
| Haskell | | – | | 9 | – | 3 | – | 1 |
| Western State Normal | | – | | 6 | – | 2 | – | 1 |
| Loyola (IL) | | – | | 6 | – | 2 | – | 0 |
| Central Michigan | | – | | 4 | – | 1 | – | 3 |
| Adrian | | – | | 6 | – | 3 | – | 0 |
| Butler | | – | | 5 | – | 2 | – | 2 |
| Michigan Mines | | – | | 2 | – | 1 | – | 0 |
| Detroit City College | | – | | 4 | – | 3 | – | 1 |
| Detroit | | – | | 5 | – | 4 | – | 0 |
| Assumption (ON) | | – | | 3 | – | 3 | – | 1 |
| Kent State | | – | | 1 | – | 1 | – | 3 |
| Michigan State | | – | | 3 | – | 5 | – | 0 |
| Muncie Normal | | – | | 2 | – | 5 | – | 0 |
| John Carroll | | – | | 2 | – | 6 | – | 1 |
| Saint Louis | | – | | 2 | – | 6 | – | 1 |
| Valparaiso | | – | | 1 | – | 6 | – | 0 |

The 1925 Haskell Indians football team was an American football team that represented the Haskell Institute (later renamed Haskell Indian Nations University) as an independent during the 1925 college football season. In its fourth season under head coach Dick Hanley, the team compiled a 9–3–1 record and outscored opponents by a total of 229 to 65.

The 1925 Haskell team traveled across the country, including games in Boston, Chicago, Los Angeles, Spokane, Washington, and Richmond, Virginia, and was described as having earned "the title of most-traveled team." The team reportedly traveled 45,000 miles from 1923 to 1925. Haskell played only one home game during the 1925 season, that one taking place at Lawrence High School. After the 1925 season, Haskell built its own football stadium, Haskell Memorial Stadium, at a cost of approximately $200,000.

Mayes McLain played for Haskell during the 1925 and 1926 seasons. In 1926, he set the all-time college football scoring record with 253 points on 38 touchdowns, 19 extra point kicks, and two field goals.

== Schedule ==
| Date | Opponent | Site | Result | Attendance | Source |
|---|---|---|---|---|---|
| September 19 | at Drury | Springfield, MO | W 40–0 | | |
| September 26 | Fairmount | Lawrence High School field; Lawrence, KS | W 35–0 | | |
| October 3 | at Tulsa | McNulty Park; Tulsa, OK | W 33–0 | | |
| October 12 | at Boston College | Braves Field; Boston, MA | L 6–7 | | |
| October 17 | at Bucknell | Bucknell University Memorial Stadium; Lewisburg, PA | T 0–0 | 8,000 | |
| October 23 | at Midland | Fremont, NE | W 29–0 | | |
| October 31 | at Gonzaga | Gonzaga Stadium; Spokane, WA | W 10–9 | 15,000 | |
| November 7 | at Dayton | University of Dayton Stadium; Dayton, OH | L 2–6 | 4,000 | |
| November 11 | vs. William & Mary | Richmond, VA | W 14–13 | 7,000 | |
| November 21 | at Creighton | Omaha, NE | W 16–7 | | |
| November 26 | at St. Xavier | Corcoran Field; Cincinnati, OH | W 34–8 | | |
| November 28 | at Loyola (IL) | Soldier Field; Chicago, IL | L 0–6 | 6,000 | |
| December 19 | at Los Angeles Athletic Club | Wrigley Park; Los Angeles, CA | W 10–9 | 6,500 | |
