= 1925 Northern Illinois State Teachers football team =

American college football season

1925 Northern Illinois State Teachers football
- Conference: Independent
- Record: 6–1
- Head coach: William Muir (3rd season)
- Captain: Junior Hahn
- Home stadium: Glidden Field

1925 Midwestern college football independents records
	Conf.			Overall
Team	W	L	T	W		L		T
Northern Illinois State		–		6	–	1	–	0
Dayton		–		7	–	2	–	0
Marquette		–		7	–	2	–	0
Notre Dame		–		7	–	2	–	1
Haskell		–		9	–	3	–	1
Western State Normal		–		6	–	2	–	1
Loyola (IL)		–		6	–	2	–	0
Central Michigan		–		4	–	1	–	3
Adrian		–		6	–	3	–	0
Butler		–		5	–	2	–	2
Michigan Mines		–		2	–	1	–	0
Detroit City College		–		4	–	3	–	1
Detroit		–		5	–	4	–	0
Assumption (ON)		–		3	–	3	–	1
Kent State		–		1	–	1	–	3
Michigan State		–		3	–	5	–	0
Muncie Normal		–		2	–	5	–	0
John Carroll		–		2	–	6	–	1
Saint Louis		–		2	–	6	–	1
Valparaiso		–		1	–	6	–	0

The 1925 Northern Illinois State Teachers football team represented Northern Illinois State Teachers College as an independent during the 1925 college football season. They were led by third-year head coach William Muir and played their home games at Glidden Field, located on the east end of campus. The Teachers finished the season with a 6–1 record. Junior Hahn was the team's captain.

While Northern Illinois State had been a member of the Illinois Intercollegiate Athletic Conference prior to the 1925 season, it withdrew from the conference prior to its first game against another member, the October 10 game against North-Western College. Despite its withdrawal, North-Western attempted to protest the result of the game to conference officials, claiming that Northern Illinois State had used ineligible players.

== Schedule ==
Date	Opponent	Site	Result	Source
September 25	St. Bede's	Glidden Field; DeKalb, IL	W 6–0	
October 10	at North-Western College	Naperville, IL	W 13–0	
October 16	at Milton	Milton, WI	W 7–2	
October 24	Illinois State Normal	Glidden Field; DeKalb, IL	W 8–0	
October 31	Chicago YMCA	Glidden Field; DeKalb, IL	L 0–3	
November 7	Mount Morris	Glidden Field; DeKalb, IL	W 12–0	
November 14	at Wheaton (IL)	Wheaton, IL	W 6–0	
