= 1925 Lombard Olive football team =

American college football season

1925 Lombard Olive football
- Conference: Western Interstate Conference
- Record: 3–5 (1–0 WIC)
- Head coach: Harry M. Bell (2nd season)
- Home stadium: Lombard Stadium

1925 Western Interstate Conference football standings
| | Conf. | | | | | Overall |
| Team | W | | L | | T | W | | L | | T |
|---|---|---|---|---|---|---|---|---|---|---|
| Lombard | 1 | – | 0 | – | 0 | 3 | – | 5 | – | 0 |
| Columbia (IA) | 3 | – | 1 | – | 1 | 4 | – | 3 | – | 1 |
| DePaul | 2 | – | 1 | – | 1 | 4 | – | 2 | – | 1 |
| St. Viator | 2 | – | 1 | – | 1 | 5 | – | 3 | – | 1 |
| Luther | 1 | – | 1 | – | 0 | 3 | – | 4 | – | 0 |
| La Crosse Normal | 0 | – | 2 | – | 1 | 1 | – | 4 | – | 2 |
| Valparaiso | 0 | – | 3 | – | 0 | 1 | – | 6 | – | 0 |

The 1925 Lombard Olive football team was an American football team that represented Lombard College as a member of the Western Interstate Conference (WIC) during the 1925 college football season.

== Schedule ==
| Date | Opponent | Site | Result | Attendance | Source |
|---|---|---|---|---|---|
| September 26 | Mount Morris* | Lombard Stadium; Galesburg, IL | W 32–0 | | |
| October 3 | at Notre Dame* | Cartier Field; Notre Dame, IN | L 0–69 | 10,000 | |
| October 17 | St. Viator | Lombard Stadium; Galesburg, IL | W 10–0 | | |
| October 24 | at Marquette* | Marquette Stadium; Milwaukee, WI | L 0–7 | | |
| October 31 | at Loyola (IL)* | Chicago, IL | W 13–7 | | |
| November 6 | Illinois Wesleyan* | Lombard Stadium; Galesburg, IL | L 0–16 | | |
| November 14 | at Lake Forest* | Lake Forest, IL | L 0–6 | | |
| November 26 | at Bradley* | Tech field; Peoria, IL | L 0–7 | 5,000 | |
*Non-conference game
