= Elmer Wynne =

American football player and coach (1901–1989)

Biographical details
- Born: January 20, 1901; Long Island, Kansas, U.S.
- Died: November 8, 1989 (aged 88); Brush, Colorado, U.S.

Playing career
- 1922: Nebraska
- 1925–1927: Notre Dame
- 1928: Chicago Bears
- 1929: Dayton Triangles
- Position: Fullback

Coaching career (HC unless noted)
- 1931–1932: Colorado Mines

Head coaching record
- Overall: 2–12–1

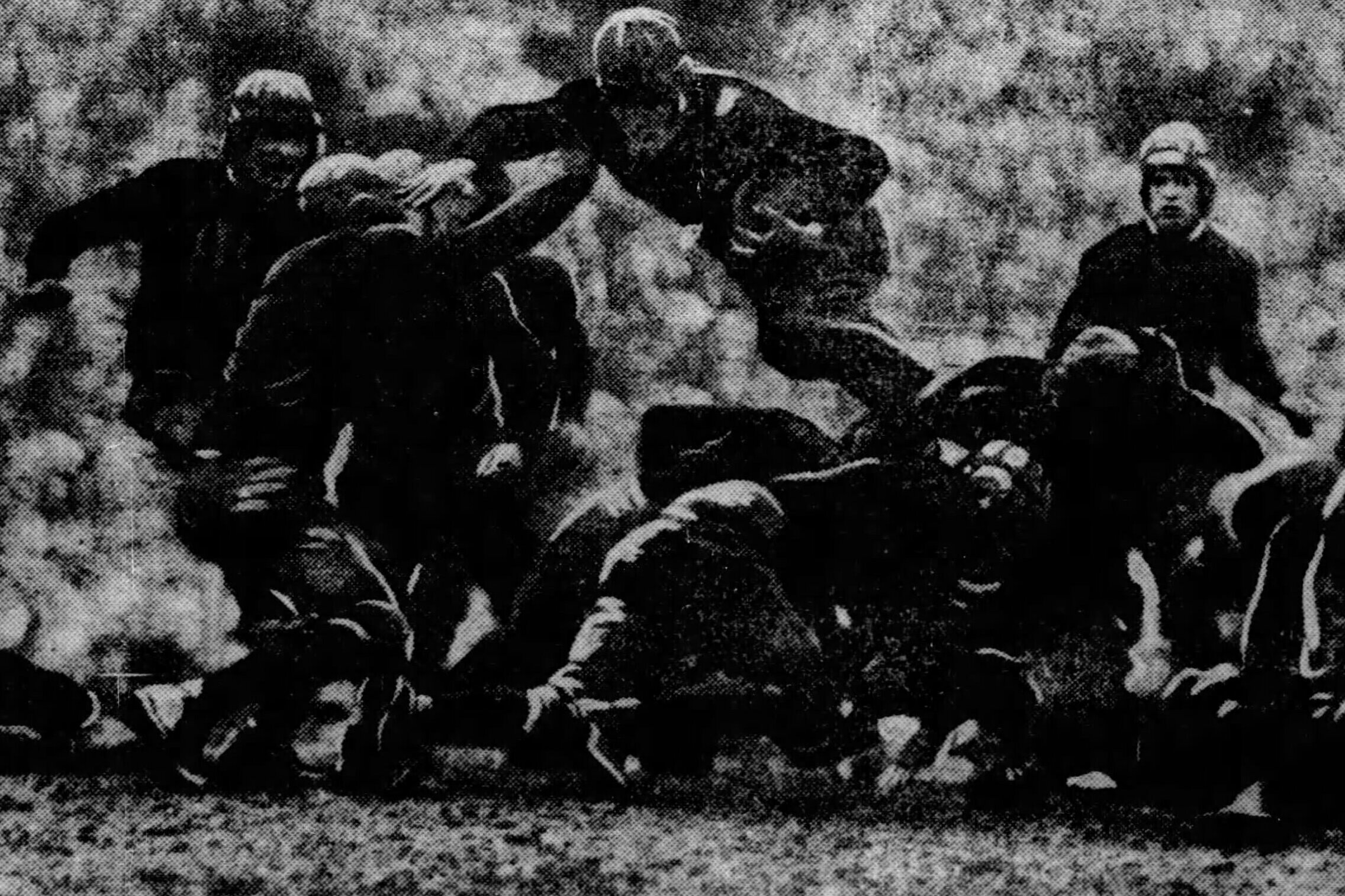
Wynne, playing for Notre Dame, leaps over the USC Trojans defensive line in a November 1926 game at Soldier Field in Chicago

Elmer Burton Wynne (January 20, 1901 – November 8, 1989) was an American football player and coach. He was a three-year lettermen at the University of Notre Dame from 1925 to 1927. Wynne then played professionally in the National Football League (NFL), with the Chicago Bears in 1928 and the Dayton Triangles in 1929. He was the head football coach at Colorado School of Mines from 1931 to 1932, compiling a record of 2–12–1.

== Head coaching record ==
Year	Team	Overall	Conference	Standing	Bowl/playoffs
Colorado Mines Orediggers (Rocky Mountain Conference) (1931–1932)
1931	Colorado Mines	1–5–1	0–4–1	11th	
1932	Colorado Mines	1–7	1–5	10th	
Colorado Mines:		2–12–1	1–9–1		
Total:		2–12–1			
