= Harry O'Boyle =

American football player (1904–1994)

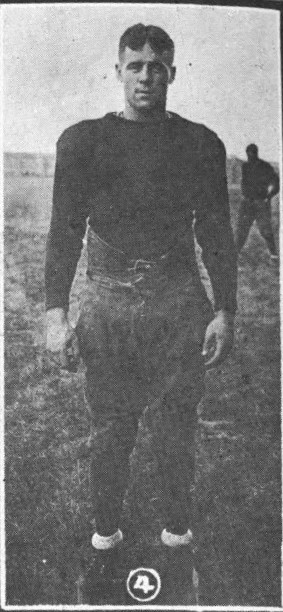

Profile
- Position: Blocking back

Personal information
- Born: October 31, 1904; Des Moines, Iowa, U.S.
- Died: May 5, 1994 (aged 89)
- Listed height: 5 ft 9 in (1.75 m)
- Listed weight: 178 lb (81 kg)

Career information
- College: Notre Dame

Career history
- Green Bay Packers (1928–1929, 1932); Philadelphia Eagles (1933)

Awards and highlights
- NFL champion (1929)

Career statistics
- Rushing attempts: 11
- Rushing yards: 18
- Touchdowns: 1
- Stats at Pro Football Reference

Harry O'Boyle (October 31, 1904 – May 5, 1994) was an American football blocking back in the National Football League (NFL). He first was a member of the Green Bay Packers for two seasons, however he did not see any playing time during a regular season game during his second season. After two seasons away from the NFL, he re-joined the Packers for the 1933 NFL season. The following season, he played with the Philadelphia Eagles.
