= 1925 Assumption Purple football team =

American college football season

1925 Assumption Purple football
- Conference: Independent
- Record: 3–3–1
- Head coach: Father O'Loane
- Captain: Kramer
- Home stadium: Sandwich Field

1925 Midwestern college football independents records
	Conf.			Overall
Team	W	L	T	W		L		T
Northern Illinois State		–		6	–	1	–	0
Dayton		–		7	–	2	–	0
Marquette		–		7	–	2	–	0
Notre Dame		–		7	–	2	–	1
Haskell		–		9	–	3	–	1
Western State Normal (MI)		–		6	–	2	–	1
Loyola (IL)		–		6	–	2	–	0
Central Michigan		–		4	–	1	–	3
Adrian		–		6	–	3	–	0
Butler		–		5	–	2	–	2
Michigan Mines		–		2	–	1	–	0
Detroit City College		–		4	–	3	–	1
Detroit		–		5	–	4	–	0
Assumption (ON)		–		3	–	3	–	1
Kent State		–		1	–	1	–	3
Michigan State		–		3	–	5	–	0
Muncie Normal		–		2	–	5	–	0
John Carroll		–		2	–	6	–	1
Saint Louis		–		2	–	6	–	1
Valparaiso		–		1	–	6	–	0

The 1925 Assumption Purple football team was an American football team that represented Assumption College of Sandwich, Ontario, Canada, during the 1925 college football season. Father O'Loane was the head coach, and Father V. Kennedy was the assistant coach. Kramer was the team captain.

== Schedule ==
Date	Opponent	Site	Result	Source
October 10	at Detroit City College	Codd Field; Detroit, MI	L 0–9	
October 17	at Defiance	Defiance, OH	T 3–3	
October 24	Tai Kun Club	Sandwich Field; Sandwich, ON	W 34–7	
October 31	Toledo	Sandwich Field; Sandwich, ON	W 6–2	
November 6	at Detroit freshmen	Dinan Field; Detroit, MI	L 0–48	
November 14	Fairviews	Sandwich Field; Sandwich, ON	W 7–0	
November 21	Adrian	Sandwich Field; Sandwich, ON	L 0–3	
