= 1925 Dayton Flyers football team =

American college football season

1925 Dayton Flyers football
- Conference: Independent
- Record: 7–2
- Head coach: Harry Baujan (3rd season)
- Home stadium: University of Dayton Stadium

1925 Midwestern college football independents records
	Conf.			Overall
Team	W	L	T	W		L		T
Northern Illinois State		–		6	–	1	–	0
Dayton		–		7	–	2	–	0
Marquette		–		7	–	2	–	0
Notre Dame		–		7	–	2	–	1
Haskell		–		9	–	3	–	1
Western State Normal		–		6	–	2	–	1
Loyola (IL)		–		6	–	2	–	0
Central Michigan		–		4	–	1	–	3
Adrian		–		6	–	3	–	0
Butler		–		5	–	2	–	2
Michigan Mines		–		2	–	1	–	0
Detroit City College		–		4	–	3	–	1
Detroit		–		5	–	4	–	0
Assumption (ON)		–		3	–	3	–	1
Kent State		–		1	–	1	–	3
Michigan State		–		3	–	5	–	0
Muncie Normal		–		2	–	5	–	0
John Carroll		–		2	–	6	–	1
Saint Louis		–		2	–	6	–	1
Valparaiso		–		1	–	6	–	0

The 1925 Dayton Flyers football team was an American football team that represented the University of Dayton as an independent during the 1925 college football season. In its third season under head coach Harry Baujan, the team compiled a 7–2 record and shut out five of nine opponents. Louis Mahrt was the team captain. At the end of the season, the Dayton Daily News called the team "the best in the history of the school." The team played its home games at the newly built University of Dayton Stadium in Dayton, Ohio.

== Schedule ==
Date	Opponent	Site	Result	Attendance	Source
October 3	Wilmington (OH)	University of Dayton Stadium; Dayton, OH	W 45–0	6,000	
October 10	at Toledo	Toledo, OH	W 29–6		
October 17	John Carroll	University of Dayton Stadium; Dayton, OH	W 17–0	7,500	
October 25	Loyola (IL)	Grant Park Stadium; Chicago, IL	L 2–6	10,000	
October 31	at Cincinnati	Nippert Stadium; Cincinnati, OH	W 23–0		
November 7	Haskell	University of Dayton Stadium; Dayton, OH	W 6–2	4,000	
November 14	at Butler	Irwin Field; Indianapolis, IN	L 7–10		
November 21	Otterbein	University of Dayton Stadium; Dayton, OH	W 48–0		
November 28	Bucknell	University of Dayton Stadium; Dayton, OH	W 19–0		
