= John Wallace (American football end) =

American football player (1904–1981)

Profile
- Position: End

Personal information
- Born: September 2, 1904; Coal City, Illinois, U.S.
- Died: July 3, 1981 (aged 76); Mission Viejo, California, U.S.
- Listed height: 6 ft 0 in (1.83 m)
- Listed weight: 180 lb (82 kg)

Career information
- High school: Emerson (IN)
- College: Notre Dame

Career history
- Chicago Bears (1928); Dayton Triangles (1929)

Career statistics
- Games: 16

John James Wallace (September 2, 1904 – July 3, 1981) was an American football player.

Wallace was born in 1904 in Coal City, Illinois. He attended Emerson High School in Gary, Indiana. He then enrolled at the University of Notre Dame where he played on Knute Rockne's Notre Dame Fighting Irish football teams from 1923 to 1926.

Wallace also played professional football in the National Football League (NFL) as an end for the Chicago Bears in 1928 and the Dayton Triangles in 1929. He appeared in 16 NFL games, five as a starter.

Wallace died in 1981 at Mission Viejo, California.
