= 1925 Marquette Golden Avalanche football team =

American college football season

1925 Marquette Golden Avalanche football
- Conference: Independent
- Record: 7–2
- Head coach: Frank Murray (4th season)
- Home stadium: Marquette Stadium

1925 Midwestern college football independents records
	Conf.			Overall
Team	W	L	T	W		L		T
Northern Illinois State		–		6	–	1	–	0
Dayton		–		7	–	2	–	0
Marquette		–		7	–	2	–	0
Notre Dame		–		7	–	2	–	1
Haskell		–		9	–	3	–	1
Western State Normal		–		6	–	2	–	1
Loyola (IL)		–		6	–	2	–	0
Central Michigan		–		4	–	1	–	3
Adrian		–		6	–	3	–	0
Butler		–		5	–	2	–	2
Michigan Mines		–		2	–	1	–	0
Detroit City College		–		4	–	3	–	1
Detroit		–		5	–	4	–	0
Assumption (ON)		–		3	–	3	–	1
Kent State		–		1	–	1	–	3
Michigan State		–		3	–	5	–	0
Muncie Normal		–		2	–	5	–	0
John Carroll		–		2	–	6	–	1
Saint Louis		–		2	–	6	–	1
Valparaiso		–		1	–	6	–	0

The 1925 Marquette Golden Avalanche football team was an American football team that represented Marquette University as an independent during the 1925 college football season. In its fourth season under head coach Frank Murray, the team compiled a 7–2 record.

== Schedule ==
Date	Opponent	Site	Result	Attendance	Source
September 26	Loyola (IL)	Marquette Stadium; Milwaukee, WI	W 10–0		
October 3	Saint Mary's (MN)	Marquette Stadium; Milwaukee, WI	W 14–0		
October 10	at Navy	Thompson Stadium; Annapolis, MD	L 0–19		
October 24	Lombard	Marquette Stadium; Milwaukee, WI	W 7–0		
October 31	Creighton	Marquette Stadium; Milwaukee, WI	W 28–0		
November 7	Kansas State	Marquette Stadium; Milwaukee, WI	L 0–2		
November 14	South Dakota State	Marquette Stadium; Milwaukee, WI	W 6–0		
November 21	North Dakota	Marquette Stadium; Milwaukee, WI	W 13–0		
November 26	Mercer	Marquette Stadium; Milwaukee, WI	W 30–0	10,000	
