= 1925 Western State Normal Hilltoppers football team =

American college football season

1925 Western State Normal Hilltoppers football
- Conference: Independent
- Record: 6–2–1
- Head coach: Earl Martineau (2nd season)
- Captain: Walter Farrer
- Home stadium: Normal field

1925 Midwestern college football independents records
	Conf.			Overall
Team	W	L	T	W		L		T
Northern Illinois State		–		6	–	1	–	0
Dayton		–		7	–	2	–	0
Marquette		–		7	–	2	–	0
Notre Dame		–		7	–	2	–	1
Haskell		–		9	–	3	–	1
Western State Normal		–		6	–	2	–	1
Loyola (IL)		–		6	–	2	–	0
Central Michigan		–		4	–	1	–	3
Adrian		–		6	–	3	–	0
Butler		–		5	–	2	–	2
Michigan Mines		–		2	–	1	–	0
Detroit City College		–		4	–	3	–	1
Detroit		–		5	–	4	–	0
Assumption (ON)		–		3	–	3	–	1
Kent State		–		1	–	1	–	3
Michigan State		–		3	–	5	–	0
Muncie Normal		–		2	–	5	–	0
John Carroll		–		2	–	6	–	1
Saint Louis		–		2	–	6	–	1
Valparaiso		–		1	–	6	–	0

The 1925 Western State Normal Hilltoppers football team represented Western State Normal School (later renamed Western Michigan University) as an independent during the 1925 college football season. In their second season under head coach Earl Martineau, the Hilltoppers compiled a 6–2–1 record and outscored their opponents, 125 to 47. Quarterback Walter Farrer was the team captain.

== Schedule ==
Date	Time	Opponent	Site	Result	Source
September 26	2:30 p.m.	Western Kentucky State Normal	Normal field; Kalamazoo, MI	W 20–0	
October 3		at Bradley	Tech field; Peoria, IL	L 2–6	
October 10	2:30 p.m.	at St. Thomas (MN)	Lexington Park; Saint Paul, MN	L 13–27	
October 17	2:30 p.m.	Valparaiso	Normal field; Kalamazoo, MI	W 45–0	
October 23	2:30 p.m.	Notre Dame freshmen	Normal field; Kalamazoo, MI	W 21–0	
October 31	2:00 p.m.	at Oshkosh Normal	Fairgrounds; Oshkosh, WI	W 7–6	
November 7	2:30 p.m.	Central Michigan	Normal field; Kalamazoo, MI (rivalry)	T 0–0	
November 14	2:30 p.m.	Chicago YMCA College	Normal field; Kalamazoo, MI	W 14–6	
November 26		at Albion	Alumni Field; Albion, MI	W 3–2	
All times are in Central time
