= Greg Wallace =

American football coach (born c. 1948)

Current position
- Title: Offensive assistant
- Team: Grinnell
- Conference: MWC

Biographical details
- Born: c. 1948 or 1949 (age 77–78); Belton, Missouri, U.S.
- Education: Missouri Valley College (1970); Central Missouri State University (1976)

Playing career

Football
- 1966–1969: Missouri Valley

Baseball
- 1966–1969: Missouri Valley
- Positions: Guard (football); Infielder (baseball)

Coaching career (HC unless noted)

Football
- 1970–1971: Odessa HS (MO) (assistant)
- 1972–1973: Odessa HS (MO)
- 1974–1976: Sherwood HS (MO)
- 1977: Indiana State (GA)
- 1978–1982: Centre (OL)
- 1983–1987: Centre (OC/OL)
- 1988–2008: Grinnell
- 2023–present: Grinnell (OA)

Baseball
- 1974–1976: Sherwood HS (MO)
- 1978–1987: Centre

Golf
- 1992–2006: Grinnell

Administrative career (AD unless noted)
- 1974–1976: Sherwood HS (MO)
- 2007–2016: Grinnell

Head coaching record
- Overall: 71–128–1 (college football)

Accomplishments and honors

Championships
- 1 MWC (1998); 1 MWC South Division (1997)

Awards
- 3× MWC Coach of the Year (1994, 1997–1998)

Greg Wallace (born c. 1948 or 1949) is an American college football coach. He is an offensive assistant for Grinnell College, a position he has held since 2023. He was the head football coach for Odessa High School from 1972 to 1973, Sherwood High School from 1974 to 1976, and Grinnell College from 1988 to 2008. He also coached for Indiana State and Centre. He played college football and baseball for Missouri Valley.

From 2007 to 2016, Wallace served as the athletic director for Grinnell College.

== Head coaching record ==
=== College football ===
Year	Team	Overall	Conference	Standing
Grinnell Pioneers (Midwest Conference) (1988–2008)
1988	Grinnell	2–6	1–5	6th (South)
1989	Grinnell	3–6	1–5	6th (South)
1990	Grinnell	0–8–1	0–7	6th (South)
1991	Grinnell	2–7	1–4	5th (South)
1992	Grinnell	0–9	0–5	6th (South)
1993	Grinnell	0–9	0–5	6th (South)
1994	Grinnell	4–5	2–3	4th (South)
1995	Grinnell	4–5	2–3	4th (South)
1996	Grinnell	4–5	2–3	4th (South)
1997	Grinnell	5–5	3–0	1st (South)
1998	Grinnell	10–0	9–0	1st
1999	Grinnell	7–3	7–2	2nd
2000	Grinnell	5–5	5–4	T–3rd
2001	Grinnell	5–5	5–3	4th
2002	Grinnell	4–6	4–5	7th
2003	Grinnell	3–7	2–7	10th
2004	Grinnell	6–4	5–4	T–4th
2005	Grinnell	1–9	0–9	10th
2006	Grinnell	2–8	2–7	8th
2007	Grinnell	1–9	1–8	T–9th
2008	Grinnell	3–7	2–7	T–8th
Grinnell:		71–128–1	54–96	
Total:		71–128–1		
National championship Conference title Conference division title or championship game berth
