= 1925 Adrian Bulldogs football team =

American college football season

1925 Adrian Bulldogs football
- Conference: Independent
- Record: 6–3
- Head coach: Dale R. Sprankle (3rd season)
- Home stadium: Adrian Athletic Field

1925 Midwestern college football independents records
	Conf.			Overall
Team	W	L	T	W		L		T
Northern Illinois State		–		6	–	1	–	0
Dayton		–		7	–	2	–	0
Marquette		–		7	–	2	–	0
Notre Dame		–		7	–	2	–	1
Haskell		–		9	–	3	–	1
Western State Normal		–		6	–	2	–	1
Loyola (IL)		–		6	–	2	–	0
Central Michigan		–		4	–	1	–	3
Adrian		–		6	–	3	–	0
Butler		–		5	–	2	–	2
Michigan Mines		–		2	–	1	–	0
Detroit City College		–		4	–	3	–	1
Detroit		–		5	–	4	–	0
Assumption (ON)		–		3	–	3	–	1
Kent State		–		1	–	1	–	3
Michigan State		–		3	–	5	–	0
Muncie Normal		–		2	–	5	–	0
John Carroll		–		2	–	6	–	1
Saint Louis		–		2	–	6	–	1
Valparaiso		–		1	–	6	–	0

The 1925 Adrian Bulldogs football team was an American football team that represented Adrian College as an independent during the 1925 college football season. In its third season under head coach Dale R. Sprankle, the team compiled a 6–3 record and outscored opponents by a total of 84 to 62. The team played its home games at Adrian Athletic Field in Adrian, Michigan.

== Schedule ==
Date	Opponent	Site	Result	Source
September 26	at Michigan State	College Field; East Lansing, MI	L 0–16	
October 3	Olivet	Adrian Athletic Field; Adrian, MI	W 7–6	
October 10	Manchester (IN)	Adrian Athletic Field; Adrian, MI	W 28–7	
October 17	Geneva	Beaver Falls, PA	L 0–21	
October 24	at Ashland	Ashland, OH	W 13–0	
October 31	Detroit City College	Adrian Athletic Field; Adrian, MI	W 20–0	
November 7	at Bethany (WV)	Wellsburg, WV	L 0–12	
November 14	Hillsdale	Adrian Athletic Field; Adrian, MI	W 13–0	
November 21	at Assumption (ON)*	Windsor, Ontario	W 3–0	
*Non-conference game
