= 1925 Central Michigan Dragons football team =

American college football season

1925 Central Michigan Dragons football
- Conference: Independent
- Record: 4–1–3
- Head coach: Lester Barnard (2nd season)

1925 Midwestern college football independents records
	Conf.			Overall
Team	W	L	T	W		L		T
Northern Illinois State		–		6	–	1	–	0
Dayton		–		7	–	2	–	0
Marquette		–		7	–	2	–	0
Notre Dame		–		7	–	2	–	1
Haskell		–		9	–	3	–	1
Western State Normal		–		6	–	2	–	1
Loyola (IL)		–		6	–	2	–	0
Central Michigan		–		4	–	1	–	3
Adrian		–		6	–	3	–	0
Butler		–		5	–	2	–	2
Michigan Mines		–		2	–	1	–	0
Detroit City College		–		4	–	3	–	1
Detroit		–		5	–	4	–	0
Assumption (ON)		–		3	–	3	–	1
Kent State		–		1	–	1	–	3
Michigan State		–		3	–	5	–	0
Muncie Normal		–		2	–	5	–	0
John Carroll		–		2	–	6	–	1
Saint Louis		–		2	–	6	–	1
Valparaiso		–		1	–	6	–	0

The 1925 Central Michigan Dragons football team represented Central Michigan Normal School, later renamed Central Michigan University, as an independent during the 1925 college football season. In their second and final season under head coach Lester Barnard, the Central Michigan football team compiled a 4–1–3 record, shut out six of eight opponents, and outscored all opponents by a combined total of 93 to 20. The team's victories included games against Northern State Teachers (8-0), Valparaiso (41-0), and Detroit City College (18–6). It played three scoreless ties (Detroit frosh, Western State Teachers, and Albion), and its sole loss was to Alma College by a 14–0 score.

After the 1925 season, Lester Barnard resigned as the team's head football coach and accepted a coaching position at Kalamazoo College, where his twin brother Chester was also a coach. In his two years as head coach at Central Michigan, Barnard compiled a record of 11–2–3, and his teams shut out 12 of 16 opponents and outscored all opponents, 251 to 39.

== Schedule ==
Date	Time	Opponent	Site	Result	Source
October 3		Carrollton Athletic Club	Mount Pleasant, MI	W 29–0	
October 17		at Alma	Alma, MI	L 0–14	
October 24		at Northern State Normal	Marquette, MI	W 8–0	
October 31		Detroit freshman	Mount Pleasant, MI	T 0–0	
November 7	2:30 p.m.	at Western State Normal	Normal field; Kalamazoo, MI (rivalry)	T 0–0	
November 14		Valparaiso	Mount Pleasant, MI	W 41–0	
November 21		Albion^{†}	Mount Pleasant, MI	T 0–0	
November 26		at Detroit City College	Codd Field; Detroit, MI	W 18–6	
^{†}Homecoming; All times are in Central time
