= 1925 Michigan State Spartans football team =

American college football season

1925 Michigan State Spartans football
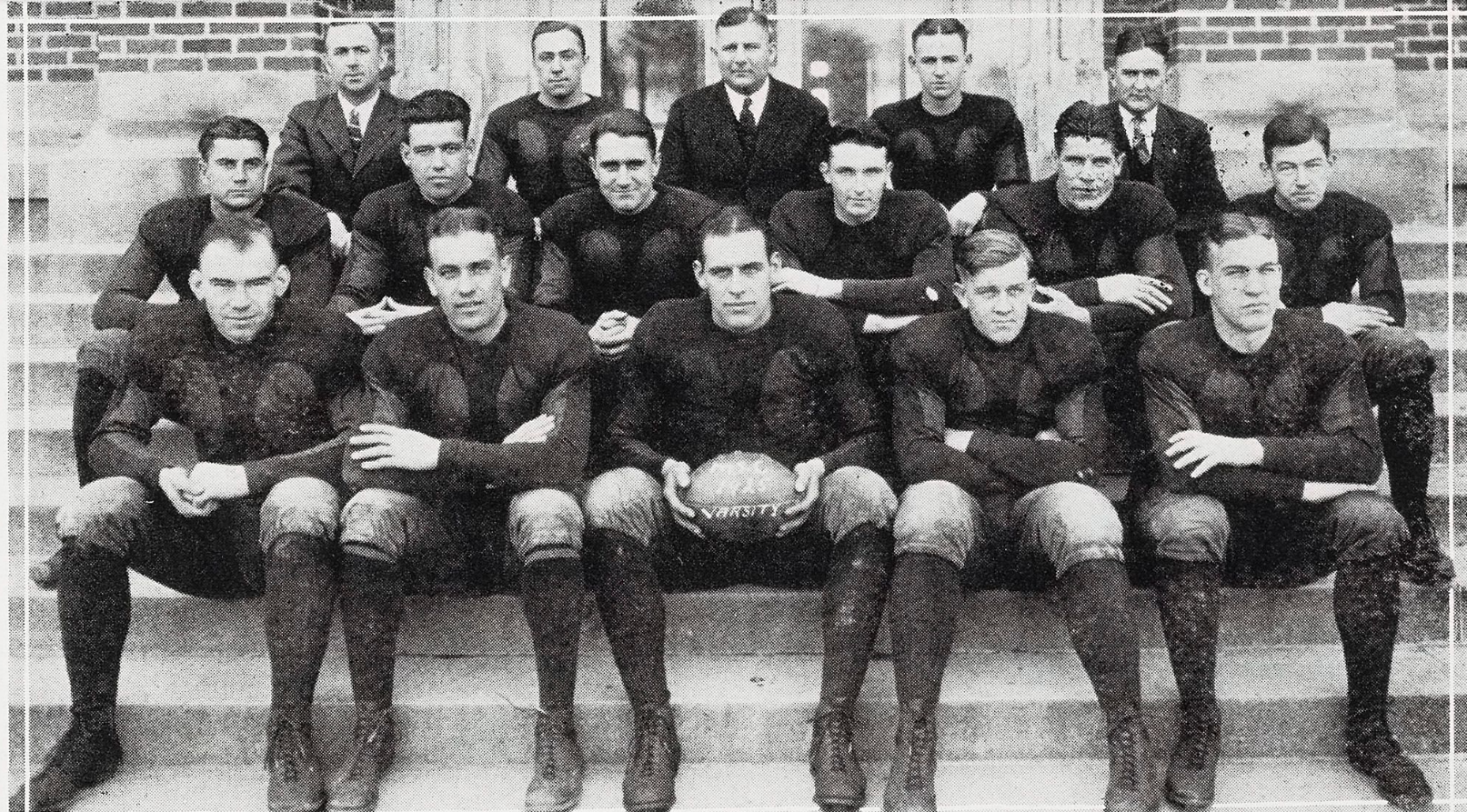
- Conference: Independent
- Record: 3–5
- Head coach: Ralph H. Young (3rd season)
- Captain: Donald H. Haskins
- Home stadium: College Field

1925 Midwestern college football independents records
	Conf.			Overall
Team	W	L	T	W		L		T
Northern Illinois State		–		6	–	1	–	0
Dayton		–		7	–	2	–	0
Marquette		–		7	–	2	–	0
Notre Dame		–		7	–	2	–	1
Haskell		–		9	–	3	–	1
Western State Normal		–		6	–	2	–	1
Loyola (IL)		–		6	–	2	–	0
Central Michigan		–		4	–	1	–	3
Adrian		–		6	–	3	–	0
Butler		–		5	–	2	–	2
Michigan Mines		–		2	–	1	–	0
Detroit City College		–		4	–	3	–	1
Detroit		–		5	–	4	–	0
Assumption (ON)		–		3	–	3	–	1
Kent State		–		1	–	1	–	3
Michigan State		–		3	–	5	–	0
Muncie Normal		–		2	–	5	–	0
John Carroll		–		2	–	6	–	1
Saint Louis		–		2	–	6	–	1
Valparaiso		–		1	–	6	–	0

The 1925 Michigan State Spartans football team was an American football team that represented Michigan State College as an independent during the 1925 college football season. In its third year under head coach Ralph H. Young, the team compiled a 3–5 record and was outscored by a total of 106 to 105.

== Schedule ==
Date	Opponent	Site	Result	Attendance	Source
September 26	Adrian	College Field; East Lansing, MI	W 16–0		
October 3	at Michigan	Ferry Field; Ann Arbor, MI (rivalry)	L 0–39	30,000	
October 10	Lake Forest	College Field; East Lansing, MI	L 0–6		
October 17	Centre	College Field; East Lansing, MI	W 15–13		
October 24	at Penn State	New Beaver Field; State College, PA (rivalry)	L 6–13	4,000	
November 1	Colgate	College Field; East Lansing, MI	L 0–14		
November 8	Toledo^{†}	College Field; East Lansing, MI	W 58–0		
November 15	at Wisconsin	Camp Randall Stadium; Madison, WI	L 10–21		
^{†}Homecoming

== Game summaries ==
=== Michigan ===
Michigan State at Michigan

Team	1	2	3	4	Total
Michigan State	0	0	0	0	0
• Michigan	13	0	26	0	39

- Date: October 3, 1925
- Location: Ferry Field • Ann Arbor, MI
- Game attendance: 30,000
- Referee: H. B. Hackett (West Point)

On October 3, 1925, the Spartans lost to Michigan by a 39 to 0 score before a crowd of 30,000 persons for a Ferry Field record. The game was the 20th meeting in the Michigan – Michigan State football rivalry. Michigan had won nine straight games, eight by shutouts, dating back to 1916. Michigan scored twice in the first quarter. The first touchdown came on a 65-yard run by Benny Friedman. Later in the quarter, Friedman completed a pass to Charles Grube for a 20-yard gain and then completed another pass to Bruce Gregory for a 30-yard gain and a touchdown. After a scoreless second quarter, Michigan led 13–0 at halftime. In the third quarter, Michigan scored three touchdowns. The first came on a pass from sophomore halfback Louis Gilbert to fellow sophomore Bennie Oosterbaan for a 40-yard gain and a touchdown. On the next drive, George Babcock ran 68 yards for a touchdown after "scooping up a fumble on the dead run." Gilbert kicked the extra point, and Michigan led, 27–0. Later in the quarter, Friedman intercepted a pass and then completed a pass to Oosterbaan for a 24-yard gain and a touchdown. The New York Times noted that Oosterbaan "sparkled in his play" and that both of his touchdowns came on "clever catches and smart running." Gilbert kicked two extra points, and Frederic Fuller kicked one.
