= 1925 Beloit Blue Devils football team =

American college football season

1925 Beloit Blue Devils football

MWC co-champion
- Conference: Midwest Conference
- Record: 6–2 (3–0 MWC)
- Head coach: Tommy Mills (6th season)

1925 Midwest Conference football standings
	Conf.					Overall
Team	W		L		T	W		L		T
Monmouth (IL) +	1	–	0	–	1	7	–	0	–	2
Carleton +	1	–	0	–	0	6	–	1	–	0
Cornell (IA) +	3	–	0	–	1	6	–	0	–	2
Beloit +	3	–	0	–	0	6	–	2	–	0
Lawrence	2	–	1	–	0	4	–	3	–	0
Coe	2	–	2	–	0	3	–	5	–	0
Ripon	0	–	3	–	0	2	–	5	–	0
Hamline	0	–	3	–	0	2	–	6	–	0
Knox	0	–	3	–	0	2	–	6	–	0
+ – Conference co-champions

The 1925 Beloit Blue Devils football team was an American football team that represented Beloit College as a member of the Midwest Conference (MWC) during the 1925 college football season. In Tommy Mills' sixth season as head coach at Beloit, the team compiled a 6–2 record, and outscored their opponents 123 to 44.

On October 10, Beloit played Notre Dame, which was coming off an undefeated campaign the year prior and had shut out its first two opponents of the season. Although Beloit lost 19–3, they were praised for putting up any points at all.

== Schedule ==
Date	Opponent	Site	Result	Attendance	Source
September 25	Milton*	Beloit, WI	W 27–6		
October 3	Northwestern (WI)*	Beloit, WI	W 40–0		
October 10	at Notre Dame*	Cartier Field; Notre Dame, IN	L 3–19	>6,000	
October 17	at Kalamazoo*	Kalamazoo, MI	L 3–10		
October 24	Knox^{†}	Beloit, WI	W 7–2		
October 31	Coe	Beloit, WI	W 16–7		
November 7	Ripon	Beloit, WI	W 14–0		
November 14	at Lawrence	Whiting Field; Appleton, WI	W 13–0		
*Non-conference game; ^{†}Homecoming
