= 1925 Saint Louis Billikens football team =

American college football season

1925 Saint Louis Billikens football
- Conference: Independent
- Record: 2–6–1
- Head coach: Dan J. Savage (3rd season)
- Captain: Frank Ramaciotti
- Home stadium: St. Louis University Field

1925 Midwestern college football independents records
	Conf.			Overall
Team	W	L	T	W		L		T
Northern Illinois State		–		6	–	1	–	0
Dayton		–		7	–	2	–	0
Marquette		–		7	–	2	–	0
Notre Dame		–		7	–	2	–	1
Haskell		–		9	–	3	–	1
Western State Normal		–		6	–	2	–	1
Loyola (IL)		–		6	–	2	–	0
Central Michigan		–		4	–	1	–	3
Adrian		–		6	–	3	–	0
Butler		–		5	–	2	–	2
Michigan Mines		–		2	–	1	–	0
Detroit City College		–		4	–	3	–	1
Detroit		–		5	–	4	–	0
Assumption (ON)		–		3	–	3	–	1
Kent State		–		1	–	1	–	3
Michigan State		–		3	–	5	–	0
Muncie Normal		–		2	–	5	–	0
John Carroll		–		2	–	6	–	1
Saint Louis		–		2	–	6	–	1
Valparaiso		–		1	–	6	–	0

The 1925 Saint Louis Billikens football team was an American football team that represented Saint Louis University as an independent during the 1925 college football season. In its third season under head coach Dan J. Savage, the team compiled a 2–6–1 record. The team played its home games at St. Louis University Field in St. Louis. Frank Ramaciotti was the team captain.

== Schedule ==
Date	Time	Opponent	Site	Result	Attendance	Source
October 3		Southwest Missouri State	St. Louis University Field; St. Louis, MO	T 0–0		
October 10		at Iowa	Iowa Field; Iowa City, IA	L 0–41		
October 17		Drury	St. Louis University Field; St. Louis, MO	W 25–7		
October 24		at Army	Michie Stadium; West Point, NY	L 0–19		
October 31		Missouri Mines	St. Louis University Field; St. Louis, MO	L 7–14	8,500	
November 7		at Detroit	University of Detroit Stadium; Detroit, MI	L 6–12		
November 14		Loyola (IL)	St. Louis University Field; St. Louis, MO	L 7–13		
November 21		Carnegie Tech^{†}	St. Louis University Field; St. Louis, MO	L 2–18	8,000	
November 26	2:00 p.m.	Vermont	St. Louis University Field; St. Louis, MO	W 7–0		
^{†}Homecoming; All times are in Central time
