= 1998 Grinnell Pioneers football team =

American college football season

1998 Grinnell Pioneers football

Midwest Conference champion
- Conference: Midwest Conference
- Record: 10–0 (9–0 MWC)
- Head coach: Greg Wallace (11th season)
- Home stadium: Ward Field

1998 Midwest Conference football standings
	Conf.			Overall
Team	W		L	W		L
Grinnell $	9	–	0	10	–	0
Beloit	7	–	2	7	–	3
Ripon	7	–	2	7	–	3
Knox	6	–	3	6	–	4
St. Norbert	5	–	4	5	–	5
Lake Forest	4	–	5	4	–	6
Carroll (WI)	3	–	6	4	–	6
Lawrence	2	–	7	2	–	8
Monmouth (IL)	2	–	7	2	–	8
Illinois College	0	–	9	0	–	10
$ – Conference champion

The 1998 Grinnell Pioneers football team represented Grinnell College of Grinnell, Iowa, as a member of the Midwest Conference (MWC) during the 1998 NCAA Division III football season. In their 11th year under head coach Greg Wallace, the Pioneers compiled a perfect 10–0 record (9–0 against conference opponents) and won the MWC championship. It was Grinnell's first perfect season since 1917.

Quarterback Troy Dougherty completed 208 of 351 passes for 2,790 yards and 32 touchdowns, tied an NCAA record with eight touchdown passes in a game, and was named Midwest Conference offensive player of the year.

== Schedule ==
Date	Opponent	Site	Result	Attendance	Source
September 12	Principia*	Grinnell, IA	W 66–0		
September 19	Beloit	Grinnell, IA	W 37–14		
September 26	at Lake Forest	Lake Forest, IL	W 39–31		
October 3	Carroll (WI)	Grinnell, IA	W 27–21		
October 10	at Illinois College	Jacksonville, IL	W 54–16		
October 17	Ripon	Grinnell, IA	W 47–3		
October 24	at St. Norbert	De Pere, WI	W 40–28		
October 31	Knox	Grinnell, IA	W 56–28		
November 7	at Monmouth (IL)	Monmouth, IL	W 37–27		
November 14	at Lawrence	Banta Bowl; Appleton, WI	W 44–28		
*Non-conference game
