= 1925 Detroit Titans football team =

American college football season

1925 Detroit Titans football
- Conference: Independent
- Record: 5–4
- Head coach: Gus Dorais (1st season)
- Home stadium: University of Detroit Stadium

1925 Midwestern college football independents records
	Conf.			Overall
Team	W	L	T	W		L		T
Northern Illinois State		–		6	–	1	–	0
Dayton		–		7	–	2	–	0
Marquette		–		7	–	2	–	0
Notre Dame		–		7	–	2	–	1
Haskell		–		9	–	3	–	1
Western State Normal		–		6	–	2	–	1
Loyola (IL)		–		6	–	2	–	0
Central Michigan		–		4	–	1	–	3
Adrian		–		6	–	3	–	0
Butler		–		5	–	2	–	2
Michigan Mines		–		2	–	1	–	0
Detroit City College		–		4	–	3	–	1
Detroit		–		5	–	4	–	0
Assumption (ON)		–		3	–	3	–	1
Kent State		–		1	–	1	–	3
Michigan State		–		3	–	5	–	0
Muncie Normal		–		2	–	5	–	0
John Carroll		–		2	–	6	–	1
Saint Louis		–		2	–	6	–	1
Valparaiso		–		1	–	6	–	0

The 1925 Detroit Titans football team represented the University of Detroit as an independent during the 1925 college football season. In their first season under head coach Gus Dorais, the Titans compiled a 5–4 record and were outscored by opponents by a combined total of 81 to 70. William K. Brett was the team captain.

== Schedule ==
Date	Opponent	Site	Result	Attendance	Source
September 26	Alma	University of Detroit Stadium; Detroit, MI	W 26–0		
October 3	Army	Michie Stadium; West Point, NY	L 6–31		
October 10	Columbia (IA)	University of Detroit Stadium; Detroit, MI	W 6–0		
October 17	Georgetown	University of Detroit Stadium; Detroit, MI	L 0–24		
October 24	Quantico Marines	University of Detroit Stadium; Detroit, MI	W 6–0		
October 31	John Carroll	Dunn Field; Cleveland, OH	W 14–6		
November 7	Saint Louis	University of Detroit Stadium; Detroit, MI	W 12–6		
November 14	Washington & Jefferson	University of Detroit Stadium; Detroit, MI	L 0–7		
November 26	Bucknell	University of Detroit Stadium; Detroit, MI	L 0–7	12,000	
