= 1925 Kent State Silver Foxes football team =

American college football season

1925 Kent State Silver Foxes football
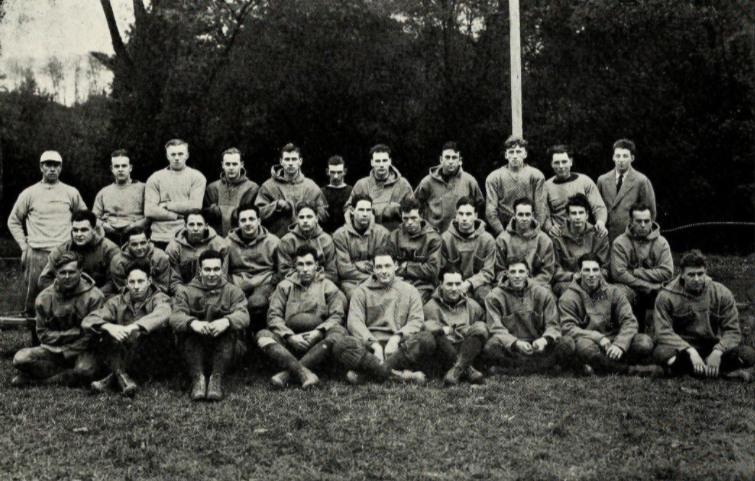
- Conference: Independent
- Record: 1–1–3
- Head coach: Merle E. Wagoner (1st season)
- Captain: Gus Peterka
- Home stadium: Rockwell Field

1925 Midwestern college football independents records
	Conf.			Overall
Team	W	L	T	W		L		T
Northern Illinois State		–		6	–	1	–	0
Dayton		–		7	–	2	–	0
Marquette		–		7	–	2	–	0
Notre Dame		–		7	–	2	–	1
Haskell		–		9	–	3	–	1
Western State Normal		–		6	–	2	–	1
Loyola (IL)		–		6	–	2	–	0
Central Michigan		–		4	–	1	–	3
Adrian		–		6	–	3	–	0
Butler		–		5	–	2	–	2
Michigan Mines		–		2	–	1	–	0
Detroit City College		–		4	–	3	–	1
Detroit		–		5	–	4	–	0
Assumption (ON)		–		3	–	3	–	1
Kent State		–		1	–	1	–	3
Michigan State		–		3	–	5	–	0
Muncie Normal		–		2	–	5	–	0
John Carroll		–		2	–	6	–	1
Saint Louis		–		2	–	6	–	1
Valparaiso		–		1	–	6	–	0

The 1925 Kent State Silver Foxes football team represented Kent State during the 1925 college football season. In its first season under head coach Merle E. Wagoner, Kent State compiled a 1–1–3 record and was outscored by a total of 24 to 13. On November 14, 1925, the team won the program's first victory on the field, defeating West Liberty by a 7-6 score. (The program's only prior victory was by default in 1920.)

The Chestnut Burr for 1926 summarized the 1925 football season as follows:

Athletics at Kent State were in an unusually depressed condition when Coach Merle Wagoner and Director Frank L. Oktavec came to take charge in the fall of '25. The college had lost 37 consecutive games scoring only one touchdown in all these games. Although Kent won but one game she can boast of going through a whole season with but one defeat. The success of this season cannot be attributed to any one player but we do owe Coach Wagoner much praise for the success of the past season. His general good spirits and his contagious enthusiasm have already won for him the respect of the college men and there is no doubt but what his success for another season will prove just as successful.

== Schedule ==
Date	Opponent	Site	Result	Source
October 17	Hiram	Kent, OH	T 0–0	
	at Edinboro	Edinboro, PA	T 0–0	
November 7	at Indiana Normal (PA)	Indiana, PA	T 6–6	
November 14	West Liberty Normal^{†}	Kent, OH	W 7–6	
November 21	Findlay	Kent, OH	L 0–12	
^{†}Homecoming

== Roster ==
The roster of the 1925 Kent state football team was as follows:

- Peterka, 185 pounds, fullback and captain
- Vair, 150 pounds, left end
- Jennings, 150 pounds, left tackle
- C. Davis, 180 pounds, right guard
- Chernin, 155 pounds, center
- F. Hall, 250 pounds, left guard
- R. Hall, 240 pounds, right tackle
- Menough, 145 pounds, quarterback
- Colville, 165 pounds, left tackle
- Crosby, 140 pounds, right end
- Feeley, 165 pounds, right halfback
- Francis, 175 pounds, left halfback
- Harvey, 150 pounds, left end
- Morris, 150 pounds, left guard
- Levering, 150 pounds, fullback
- Brown, 144 pounds, center
- N. McDermott, 144 pounds, quarterback
- Schwartz, 160 pounds, right halfback
- Hallihan, 155 pounds, center
- Spangler, 151 pounds, left guard
- Barry, 155 pounds, left guard
- Arnold, 172 pounds, right end
- A. Davis, 120 pounds, right end
- Burkett, 120 pounds, right end
- Deakins, 150 pounds, left guard
- Dunlevy, 160 pounds, right halfback
