= Kent State football (1920–1929) =

American college football seasons

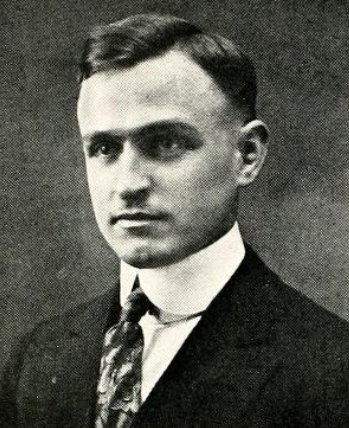
Paul G. Chandler, Kent State's first football coach

The Kent State football program represented Kent State Normal College (later Kent State University) in American football during its first decade from 1920 to 1929. The team was known as the Silver Foxes from 1920 to 1926 and as the Golden Flashes from 1927 forward. The team operated as an independent and compiled a record of 10–41–7 for the decade.

The program played its first game in 1920. It did not score any points or, with the exception of a claimed win by forfeit in 1920, win any games in 1920, 1921, or 1922. The 1923 team scored the program's first touchdown, but still failed to win a game. The first victory came in 1925, a 7–6 victory over West Liberty Normal. In 1928, the team had its first winning season, compiling a 4–2–2 record.

The team was initially given the nickname "Silver Foxes" because the school's president, John McGilvrey, raised silver foxes on a ranch adjacent to the campus.

The team had three head coaches during the decade. Paul G. Chandler, the head of the school's education department, was the head coach from 1920 to 1922 and compiled a record of 1–11–1. Frank Harsh was the head coach in 1923 and 1924, compiling a 0–9 record. Merle E. Wagoner took over as head coach in 1925 and remained as head coach for eight years, through the 1932 season.

== 1920 ==
1920 Kent State Silver Foxes football
- Conference: Independent
- Record: 1–2
- Head coach: Paul G. Chandler (1st season)
- Home stadium: Rockwell Field

1920 Midwestern college football independents records
| | Conf. | | | Overall |
| Team | W | L | T | W | | L | | T |
|---|---|---|---|---|---|---|---|---|
| Notre Dame | | – | | 9 | – | 0 | – | 0 |
| Michigan Mines | | – | | 2 | – | 0 | – | 0 |
| Butler | | – | | 7 | – | 1 | – | 0 |
| St. Xavier | | – | | 7 | – | 1 | – | 0 |
| Detroit | | – | | 8 | – | 2 | – | 0 |
| Marquette | | – | | 7 | – | 2 | – | 0 |
| Haskell | | – | | 7 | – | 2 | – | 1 |
| St. Ignatius (OH) | | – | | 4 | – | 2 | – | 0 |
| Iowa State Teachers | | – | | 4 | – | 2 | – | 1 |
| South Dakota State | | – | | 4 | – | 2 | – | 1 |
| Indiana State | | – | | 3 | – | 2 | – | 0 |
| Valparaiso | | – | | 5 | – | 3 | – | 0 |
| Nebraska | | – | | 5 | – | 3 | – | 1 |
| Central Michigan | | – | | 4 | – | 3 | – | 1 |
| Akron | | – | | 4 | – | 4 | – | 0 |
| Wabash | | – | | 3 | – | 4 | – | 0 |
| Western State Normal | | – | | 3 | – | 4 | – | 0 |
| North Dakota Agricultural | | – | | 2 | – | 3 | – | 1 |
| Michigan Agricultural | | – | | 4 | – | 6 | – | 0 |
| Earlham | | – | | 2 | – | 3 | – | 0 |
| Northern Illinois State | | – | | 3 | – | 5 | – | 0 |
| Dayton | | – | | 2 | – | 4 | – | 0 |
| Kent State | | – | | 1 | – | 2 | – | 0 |
| Saint Louis | | – | | 3 | – | 6 | – | 0 |
| Bowling Green | | – | | 1 | – | 4 | – | 0 |
| Toledo | | – | | 0 | – | 3 | – | 0 |

The 1920 Kent State Silver Foxes football team represented Kent State during the 1920 college football season. In its first season of intercollegiate football, the team compiled a 1–2 record with the sole victory coming by way of a forfeit.

The team was coached by Paul G. Chandler, the head of the school's education department.

Kent State began operating in 1912, and the 1920 football team was the first athletic team to represent the school in any sport. A football team had not been fielded earlier due in part to the fact that few men were enrolled at the school. The 1920 team included the majority of the men who were then enrolled. The surviving members of the 1920 team returned to campus and were honored at a 1970 football game.

The 1921 Kent State yearbook, The Chestnut Burr said the following of the 1920 football team:

Last year no one imagined that a foot-ball team was within the possibilities of our college, because we hadn't the first requisite — men. This year we have men enough in school to organize a football team. The boys practiced faithfully and played some good games. One College sent their team here for a scheduled game. When they came they declined to play. Their reason was that the weather was too inclement, but it was not too bad for our boys to play and for our girls to gather en masse to help our boys win by their cheering. It was quite evident to us that the incoming team was scared. They did not expect to find well trained players. When they found men ready to win their ardor cooled and they went home without playing the game.

The Chestnut Burr also described the excitement on campus prior to the first home game against Bowling Green:

Probably the most remarkable campaign by the girls was the snake dance throughout the town, one cold, crisp evening before the game with Bowling Green. In and out of shops and movies the screaming and jolly line ran, bellowing forth our yells and songs, which in no small way interpreted our deep loyalty and fighting spirit for K. S. N. C. We did not win the next day but we played fair and square which is really the true test of athletics.

=== Schedule ===
| Date | Opponent | Site | Result | Source |
|---|---|---|---|---|
| October 30 | at Ashland | Ashland, OH | L 0–6 | |
| November 6 | Bowling Green | Rockwell Field; Kent, OH (rivalry) | L 0–7 | |
| | St. Ignatius | | W 1–0 (forfeit) | |

== 1921 ==
1921 Kent State Silver Foxes football
- Conference: Independent
- Record: 0–2–1
- Head coach: Paul G. Chandler (2nd season)
- Captain: Claude Ryan
- Home stadium: Rockwell Field

1921 Midwestern college football independents records
| | Conf. | | | Overall |
| Team | W | L | T | W | | L | | T |
|---|---|---|---|---|---|---|---|---|
| Detroit Junior College | | – | | 6 | – | 0 | – | 2 |
| Notre Dame | | – | | 10 | – | 1 | – | 0 |
| Creighton | | – | | 8 | – | 1 | – | 0 |
| Detroit | | – | | 8 | – | 1 | – | 0 |
| South Dakota State | | – | | 7 | – | 1 | – | 0 |
| Kirksville Osteopaths | | – | | 6 | – | 1 | – | 0 |
| Iowa State Teachers | | – | | 5 | – | 1 | – | 1 |
| Wabash | | – | | 7 | – | 2 | – | 0 |
| Central Michigan | | – | | 7 | – | 2 | – | 1 |
| Butler | | – | | 6 | – | 2 | – | 0 |
| Western State Normal | | – | | 6 | – | 2 | – | 0 |
| Marquette | | – | | 6 | – | 2 | – | 1 |
| DePauw | | – | | 4 | – | 3 | – | 0 |
| Haskell | | – | | 5 | – | 4 | – | 0 |
| Michigan Mines | | – | | 1 | – | 1 | – | 0 |
| North Dakota Agricultural | | – | | 3 | – | 3 | – | 1 |
| Saint Louis | | – | | 4 | – | 4 | – | 1 |
| Valparaiso | | – | | 2 | – | 2 | – | 1 |
| Michigan Agricultural | | – | | 3 | – | 5 | – | 0 |
| Northern Illinois State | | – | | 3 | – | 5 | – | 0 |
| Earlham | | – | | 2 | – | 4 | – | 1 |
| St. Ignatius (OH) | | – | | 2 | – | 6 | – | 0 |
| Dayton | | – | | 1 | – | 7 | – | 1 |
| Kent State | | – | | 0 | – | 2 | – | 1 |

The 1921 Kent State Silver Foxes football team represented Kent State during the 1921 college football season. In its second season of intercollegiate football, the team compiled a 0–2–1 record and was outscored by a total of 20 to 0. Paul G. Chandler was again the head coach.

The Chestnut Burr of 1922 had only a paragraph dedicated to the football team, including the following: "Our football field saw a season of hard use when the fourteen sturdy Kent warriors tackled and charged each other in its tawny dust making the team of 1921. We went against everybody that would play us and because of our showing the best teams in the conference will play us next year. . . . With the increased number of men in school, our veteran players back, and a good number of high school graduates turned this way, we will keep up the good fight of 1920 and '21."

=== Schedule ===
| Date | Opponent | Site | Result | Source |
|---|---|---|---|---|
| October 1 | Bowling Green | Rockwell Field; Kent, OH (rivalry) | T 0–0 | |
| | John Carroll | | L 0–13 | |
| October 29 | Ashland | | L 0–7 | |

=== Roster ===
The following players received letters for their participation on the team: Claude Ryan, Captain; Louis Carnahan, Manager; Richard Renouf; G. A. Damann; L. D. Hibbard; Johnny Schwartz; Russell Hausman; Paul Spangler; Ralph Rogers; Howard Shepherd; J. J. Deetz; Oliver Wolcott; George Pordney; David Beckwith; Harold Pinach; and Howard Evans.

== 1922 ==
1922 Kent State Silver Foxes football
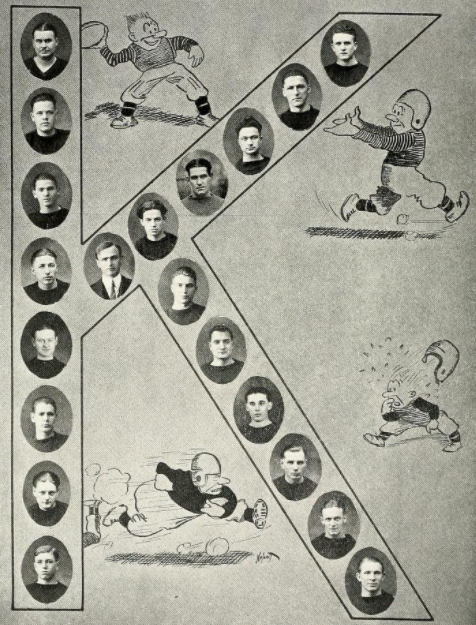
- Conference: Independent
- Record: 0–7
- Head coach: Paul G. Chandler (3rd season)
- Captain: Paul Spangler
- Home stadium: Rockwell Field

1922 Midwestern college football independents records
| | Conf. | | | Overall |
| Team | W | L | T | W | | L | | T |
|---|---|---|---|---|---|---|---|---|
| Western State Normal | | – | | 6 | – | 0 | – | 0 |
| Bradley | | – | | 9 | – | 0 | – | 1 |
| Marquette | | – | | 8 | – | 0 | – | 1 |
| Central Michigan | | – | | 6 | – | 0 | – | 2 |
| Notre Dame | | – | | 8 | – | 1 | – | 1 |
| Butler | | – | | 8 | – | 2 | – | 0 |
| Haskell | | – | | 8 | – | 2 | – | 0 |
| Detroit | | – | | 7 | – | 2 | – | 1 |
| Michigan Mines | | – | | 1 | – | 0 | – | 1 |
| Wabash | | – | | 7 | – | 3 | – | 0 |
| St. Ignatius (OH) | | – | | 4 | – | 1 | – | 3 |
| Dayton | | – | | 6 | – | 3 | – | 0 |
| Saint Louis | | – | | 6 | – | 3 | – | 1 |
| Valparaiso | | – | | 3 | – | 2 | – | 2 |
| Baldwin–Wallace | | – | | 4 | – | 3 | – | 1 |
| DePauw | | – | | 4 | – | 3 | – | 2 |
| Michigan Agricultural | | – | | 3 | – | 5 | – | 2 |
| Earlham | | – | | 2 | – | 6 | – | 0 |
| Kent State | | – | | 0 | – | 7 | – | 0 |

The 1922 Kent State Silver Foxes football team represented Kent State during the 1922 college football season. In its third season of intercollegiate football, all under head coach Paul G. Chandler, the team compiled a 0–7 record and was outscored by a total of 146 to 0. In three seasons under coach Chandler, Kent State did not score a point or win a game on the field, the sole victory coming by forfeit in 1920. Paul Spangler was the team's captain.

=== Schedule ===
| Date | Opponent | Site | Result | Source |
|---|---|---|---|---|
| September 23 | at Hiram | Hiram, OH | L 0–14 | |
| September 30 | at Mount Union | Alliance, OH | L 0–32 | |
| October 7 | at St. Ignatius | Cleveland, OH | L 0–34 | |
| October 14 | Ashland | Rockwell Field; Kent, OH | L 0–14 | |
| October 21 | at Baldwin-Wallace | Berea, OH | L 0–32 | |
| November 4 | Indiana (PA) | Rockwell Field; Kent, OH | L 0–14 | |
| November 11 | Bowling Green | Rockwell Field; Kent, OH (rivalry, Armistice Day) | L 0–6 | |

== 1923 ==
1923 Kent State Silver Foxes football
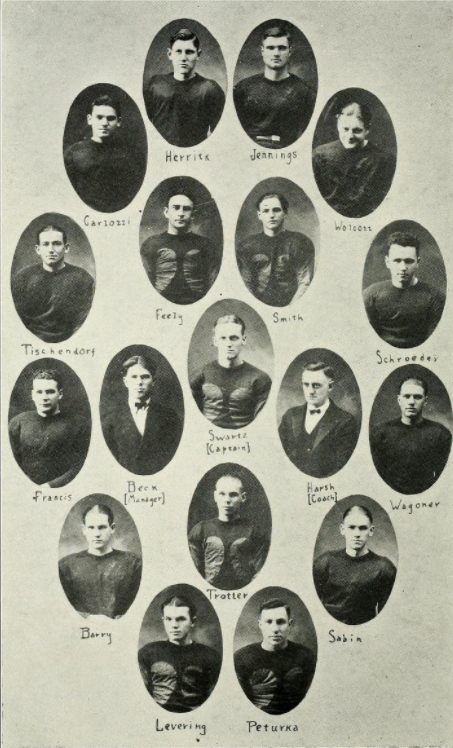
- Conference: Independent
- Record: 0–5
- Head coach: Frank Harsh (1st season)
- Home stadium: Rockwell Field

1923 Midwestern college football independents records
| | Conf. | | | Overall |
| Team | W | L | T | W | | L | | T |
|---|---|---|---|---|---|---|---|---|
| Marquette | | – | | 8 | – | 0 | – | 0 |
| Michigan Mines | | – | | 2 | – | 0 | – | 0 |
| Notre Dame | | – | | 9 | – | 1 | – | 0 |
| Western State Normal | | – | | 6 | – | 1 | – | 1 |
| Haskell | | – | | 11 | – | 2 | – | 1 |
| Butler | | – | | 7 | – | 2 | – | 0 |
| Central Michigan | | – | | 5 | – | 1 | – | 2 |
| Baldwin–Wallace | | – | | 5 | – | 2 | – | 1 |
| Cincinnati | | – | | 6 | – | 3 | – | 0 |
| Loyola (IL) | | – | | 6 | – | 3 | – | 0 |
| Saint Louis | | – | | 5 | – | 3 | – | 1 |
| Detroit | | – | | 4 | – | 3 | – | 2 |
| Wabash | | – | | 4 | – | 3 | – | 2 |
| John Carroll | | – | | 4 | – | 4 | – | 1 |
| Valparaiso | | – | | 2 | – | 2 | – | 1 |
| Dayton | | – | | 4 | – | 5 | – | 0 |
| Michigan Agricultural | | – | | 3 | – | 5 | – | 0 |
| Fairmount | | – | | 2 | – | 4 | – | 2 |
| Kent State | | – | | 0 | – | 5 | – | 0 |

The 1923 Kent State Silver Foxes football team represented Kent State during the 1923 college football season. In its first season under head coach Frank Harsh, the team compiled a 0–5 record, but did score the first touchdown in program history. Harsh was both coach of the football team and the school's director of athletics.

The Chestnut Burr for 1924 summarized the 1923 football season as follows:

Victory is not essential to success! . . . This is by way of introducing the 1923 football season at Kent State, the record of which shows no victories, but a season which may well be considered the most successful in school history.

There are many reasons why Kent State was not victorious on the gridiron during the past year. The squad was small and without experience. The starting of school one month later than usual prevented the all-important conditioning period. The team that was coached to start the season was early riddled by injuries and withdrawals. Light and inexperienced, the Blue and Gold was forced to meet on the gridiron some of the most formidable elevens in the Ohio Conference.
Please don't misinterpret: this is not written as a defense — the 1923 Kent State football team needs no defense.
Whatever may have been Coach Harsh's contributions in his first year at the helm of Kent State football, there is no gainsaying that the greatest was "FIGHT." Bruised, battered and beaten, Kent State's gallant warriors of the moleskin never relinquished that "FIGHT" and they were battling in the last minute of the last game with a spirit that augurs nothing but victory in the future. The Silver Foxes of 1923 gave to their school its first touchdown, but they also gave something infinitely more than that. They created a fighting spirit that will live — an undying determination that will make the football record at Kent State in the future a thing of joy.

All hail the season of 1923 which witnessed the birth of an unconquerable spirit! Honor the players of 1923 and enshrine them in memory's treasure-house!

=== Schedule ===
| Date | Opponent | Site | Result | Source |
|---|---|---|---|---|
| | at Akron | Akron, OH | L 0–32 | |
| | at Baldwin-Wallace | Berea, OH | L 0–118 | |
| | West Liberty | Kent, OH | L 6–7 | |
| | Slippery Rock | Kent, OH | L 0–82 | |
| | Indiana (PA) | Kent, OH | L 0–21 | |

== 1924 ==
1924 Kent State Silver Foxes football
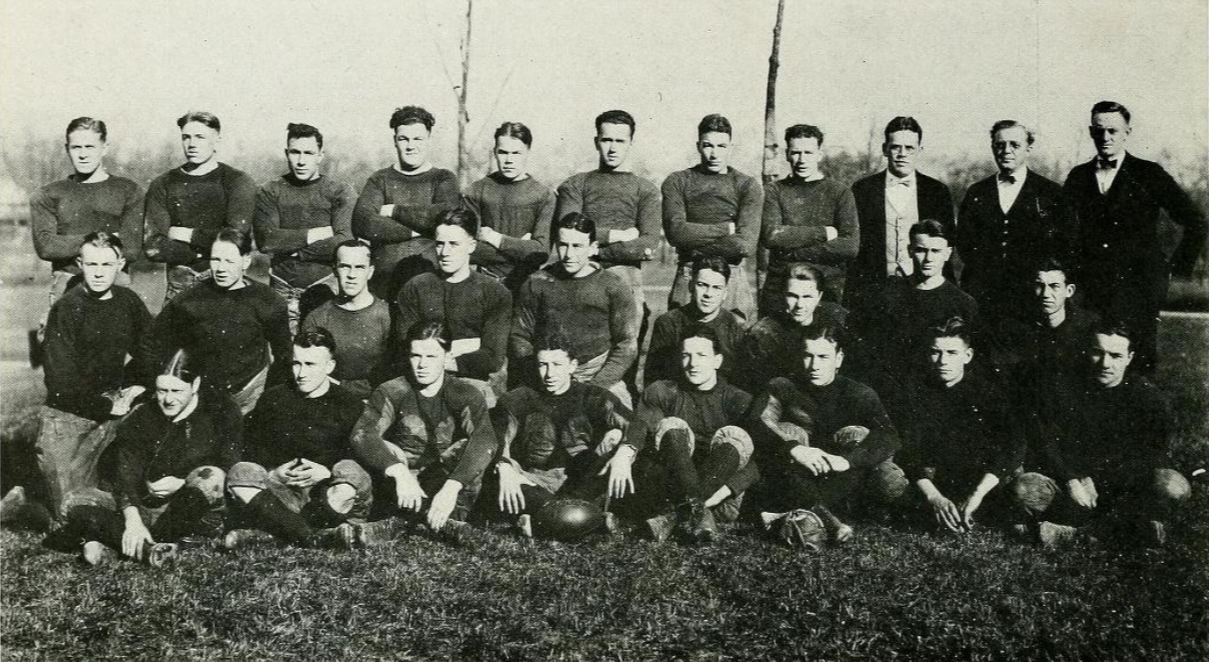
- Conference: Independent
- Record: 0–4
- Head coach: Frank Harsh (2nd season)
- Home stadium: Rockwell Field

1924 Midwestern college football independents records
| | Conf. | | | Overall |
| Team | W | L | T | W | | L | | T |
|---|---|---|---|---|---|---|---|---|
| No. 1 Notre Dame | | – | | 10 | – | 0 | – | 0 |
| Kirksville Osteopaths | | – | | 6 | – | 0 | – | 0 |
| Central Michigan | | – | | 7 | – | 1 | – | 0 |
| Western State Normal | | – | | 6 | – | 1 | – | 0 |
| John Carroll | | – | | 7 | – | 2 | – | 0 |
| Haskell | | – | | 7 | – | 2 | – | 1 |
| Indiana State | | – | | 6 | – | 2 | – | 0 |
| Loyola (IL) | | – | | 5 | – | 2 | – | 2 |
| Marquette | | – | | 5 | – | 2 | – | 0 |
| Dayton | | – | | 7 | – | 3 | – | 0 |
| Saint Louis | | – | | 6 | – | 3 | – | 0 |
| Michigan Agricultural | | – | | 5 | – | 3 | – | 0 |
| Wabash | | – | | 5 | – | 4 | – | 0 |
| Butler | | – | | 4 | – | 5 | – | 0 |
| Detroit | | – | | 4 | – | 5 | – | 0 |
| Muncie Normal | | – | | 1 | – | 3 | – | 0 |
| Michigan Mines | | – | | 0 | – | 2 | – | 1 |
| Kent State | | – | | 0 | – | 4 | – | 0 |
Rankings from Dickinson System

The 1924 Kent State Silver Foxes football team represented Kent State during the 1924 college football season. In its second season under head coach Frank Harsh, Kent State compiled a 0–4 record and was outscored 89 to 0. In two seasons under coach Harsh, the team lost all nine games and scored a total of six points.

The Chestnut Burr for 1925 summarized the 1924 football season as follows:

UNWEPT, UNHONORED AND UNSUNG, the football team of Kent State College battered through the 1924 season with no victories. The lusty bark of the Silver Fox pack, however, never lost its strength and even though pitted against superior odds at each fight, defeat was the last word to be said. . . . But now the season is over. Instead of blaming anyone for the results a Kent State is united stronger than ever, greater than before, and the spirit that soothed and sustained the founders lives yet in its students and great things yet will be heard of the college who "always lost."

=== Schedule ===
| Date | Opponent | Site | Result | Source |
|---|---|---|---|---|
| | Indiana (PA) | Rockwell Field; Kent, OH | L 0–29 | |
| | at Ashland | Ashland | L 0–20 | |
| | Hiram | Rockwell Field; Kent, OH | L 0–14 | |
| | at West Virginia State Normal | West Liberty, WV | L 0–26 | |

== 1925 ==
1925 Kent State Silver Foxes football
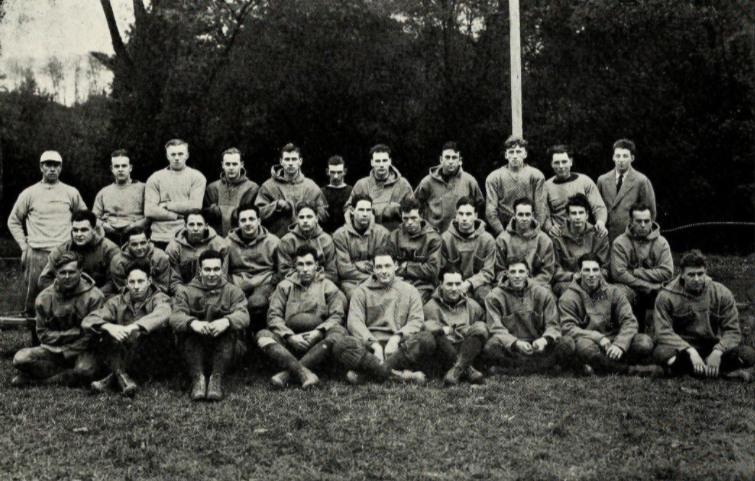
- Conference: Independent
- Record: 1–1–3
- Head coach: Merle E. Wagoner (1st season)
- Captain: Gus Peterka
- Home stadium: Rockwell Field

1925 Midwestern college football independents records
| | Conf. | | | Overall |
| Team | W | L | T | W | | L | | T |
|---|---|---|---|---|---|---|---|---|
| Northern Illinois State | | – | | 6 | – | 1 | – | 0 |
| Dayton | | – | | 7 | – | 2 | – | 0 |
| Marquette | | – | | 7 | – | 2 | – | 0 |
| Notre Dame | | – | | 7 | – | 2 | – | 1 |
| Haskell | | – | | 9 | – | 3 | – | 1 |
| Western State Normal | | – | | 6 | – | 2 | – | 1 |
| Loyola (IL) | | – | | 6 | – | 2 | – | 0 |
| Central Michigan | | – | | 4 | – | 1 | – | 3 |
| Adrian | | – | | 6 | – | 3 | – | 0 |
| Butler | | – | | 5 | – | 2 | – | 2 |
| Michigan Mines | | – | | 2 | – | 1 | – | 0 |
| Detroit City College | | – | | 4 | – | 3 | – | 1 |
| Detroit | | – | | 5 | – | 4 | – | 0 |
| Assumption (ON) | | – | | 3 | – | 3 | – | 1 |
| Kent State | | – | | 1 | – | 1 | – | 3 |
| Michigan State | | – | | 3 | – | 5 | – | 0 |
| Muncie Normal | | – | | 2 | – | 5 | – | 0 |
| John Carroll | | – | | 2 | – | 6 | – | 1 |
| Saint Louis | | – | | 2 | – | 6 | – | 1 |
| Valparaiso | | – | | 1 | – | 6 | – | 0 |

The 1925 Kent State Silver Foxes football team represented Kent State during the 1925 college football season. In its first season under head coach Merle E. Wagoner, Kent State compiled a 1–1–3 record and was outscored by a total of 24 to 13. On November 14, 1925, the team won the program's first victory on the field, defeating West Liberty by a 7-6 score. (The program's only prior victory was by default in 1920.)

The Chestnut Burr for 1926 summarized the 1925 football season as follows:

Athletics at Kent State were in an unusually depressed condition when Coach Merle Wagoner and Director Frank L. Oktavec came to take charge in the fall of '25. The college had lost 37 consecutive games scoring only one touchdown in all these games. Although Kent won but one game she can boast of going through a whole season with but one defeat. The success of this season cannot be attributed to any one player but we do owe Coach Wagoner much praise for the success of the past season. His general good spirits and his contagious enthusiasm have already won for him the respect of the college men and there is no doubt but what his success for another season will prove just as successful.

=== Schedule ===
| Date | Opponent | Site | Result | Source |
|---|---|---|---|---|
| October 17 | Hiram | Kent, OH | T 0–0 | |
| | at Edinboro | | T 0–0 | |
| November 7 | at Indiana (PA) | Indiana, Pa | T 6–6 | |
| November 14 | West Liberty Normal^{†} | Kent, OH | W 7–6 | |
| November 21 | Findlay | | L 0–12 | |
^{†}Homecoming

=== Roster ===
The roster of the 1925 Kent state football team was as follows:

- Peterka, 185 pounds, fullback and captain
- Vair, 150 pounds, left end
- Jennings, 150 pounds, left tackle
- C. Davis, 180 pounds, right guard
- Chernin, 155 pounds, center
- F. Hall, 250 pounds, left guard
- R. Hall, 240 pounds, right tackle
- Menough, 145 pounds, quarterback
- Colville, 165 pounds, left tackle
- Crosby, 140 pounds, right end
- Feeley, 165 pounds, right halfback
- Francis, 175 pounds, left halfback
- Harvey, 150 pounds, left end
- Morris, 150 pounds, left guard
- Levering, 150 pounds, fullback
- Brown, 144 pounds, center
- N. McDermott, 144 pounds, quarterback
- Schwartz, 160 pounds, right halfback
- Hallihan, 155 pounds, center
- Spangler, 151 pounds, left guard
- Barry, 155 pounds, left guard
- Arnold, 172 pounds, right end
- A. Davis, 120 pounds, right end
- Burkett, 120 pounds, right end
- Deakins, 150 pounds, left guard
- Dunlevy, 160 pounds, right halfback

== 1926 ==
1926 Kent State Silver Foxes football
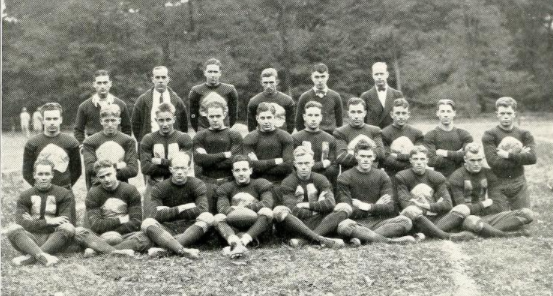
- Conference: Independent
- Record: 2–6
- Head coach: Merle E. Wagoner (2nd season)
- Captain: Donald Menough
- Home stadium: Rockwell Field

1926 Midwestern college football independents records
| | Conf. | | | Overall |
| Team | W | L | T | W | | L | | T |
|---|---|---|---|---|---|---|---|---|
| Haskell | | – | | 12 | – | 0 | – | 1 |
| No. 3 Notre Dame | | – | | 9 | – | 1 | – | 0 |
| Western State Normal | | – | | 7 | – | 1 | – | 0 |
| Michigan State Normal | | – | | 6 | – | 1 | – | 0 |
| Muncie Normal | | – | | 5 | – | 1 | – | 1 |
| Northern Illinois State | | – | | 5 | – | 1 | – | 1 |
| Marquette | | – | | 6 | – | 3 | – | 0 |
| Lombard | | – | | 5 | – | 3 | – | 0 |
| Loyola (IL) | | – | | 4 | – | 3 | – | 0 |
| Central Michigan | | – | | 3 | – | 4 | – | 1 |
| Michigan State | | – | | 3 | – | 4 | – | 1 |
| Detroit | | – | | 3 | – | 6 | – | 1 |
| Butler | | – | | 3 | – | 6 | – | 0 |
| Saint Louis | | – | | 3 | – | 6 | – | 0 |
| John Carroll | | – | | 2 | – | 5 | – | 1 |
| Kent State | | – | | 2 | – | 6 | – | 0 |
| Valparaiso | | – | | 1 | – | 4 | – | 1 |
| Michigan Mines | | – | | 0 | – | 2 | – | 1 |
Rankings from Dickinson System

The 1926 Kent State Silver Foxes football team represented Kent State during the 1926 college football season. In its second season under head coach Merle E. Wagoner, Kent State compiled a 2–6 record and was outscored by a total of 176 to 35.

In the final game of the season, the Silver Foxes gave up two first-quarter touchdowns to Wilmington College. Kent State came back with touchdowns by Searle and Schwartz, but the extra points were missed and the Silver Foxes trailed, 14-12. With one minute remaining in the game, Joe DeLeone drop-kicked the game-winning field goal. Kent State won by a 15-14 score.

=== Schedule ===
| Date | Opponent | Site | Result | Source |
|---|---|---|---|---|
| September 25 | at Wittenberg | Springfield, OH | L 0–27 | |
| October 9 | West Liberty State Normal | Rockwell Field; Kent, OH | L 2–25 | |
| October 16 | at Heidelberg | Tiffin, OH | L 0–25 | |
| October 23 | at Ashland | Ashland, OH | L 0–55 | |
| October 30 | Edinboro State Teachers | Rockwell Field; Kent, OH | W 12–0 | |
| November 6 | at Findlay | Findlay, OH | L 6–7 | |
| November 13 | Indiana Normal (PA)^{†} | Rockwell Field; Kent, OH | L 0–23 | |
| November 20 | Wilmington | Rockwell Field; Kent, OH | W 15–14 | |
^{†}Homecoming

=== Roster ===
The following 24 players received varsity letters for their participation in the 1926 football team:

- Colville, senior
- Feeley, senior
- Rogers, senior
- Peterka, senior
- Williamson, senior
- Gandee, senior
- Schwartz, senior
- Donald Menough, Ravenna, Ohio, junior, captain
- Burkett, junior
- Levering, junior
- C. Davis, junior
- Chernin, junior
- Thomas, junior
- A. Davis, junior
- Vair, sophomore
- Curtiss, sophomore
- Searl, sophomore
- R. Hall, sophomore
- Spanlger, sophomore
- Graber, sophomore
- McDermott, sophomore
- Dunlavy, sophomore
- Kelso, freshman
- M. McDermott, freshman

== 1927 ==
1927 Kent State Golden Flashes football
- Conference: Independent
- Record: 1–5–1
- Head coach: Merle E. Wagoner (3rd season)
- Home stadium: Rockwell Field

1927 Midwestern college football independents records
| | Conf. | | | Overall |
| Team | W | L | T | W | | L | | T |
|---|---|---|---|---|---|---|---|---|
| No. 4 Notre Dame | | – | | 7 | – | 2 | – | 1 |
| Detroit | | – | | 7 | – | 2 | – | 0 |
| Ball Teachers | | – | | 5 | – | 2 | – | 1 |
| Marquette | | – | | 6 | – | 3 | – | 0 |
| Michigan Tech | | – | | 2 | – | 1 | – | 0 |
| Haskell | | – | | 5 | – | 3 | – | 1 |
| Butler | | – | | 4 | – | 3 | – | 1 |
| John Carroll | | – | | 3 | – | 2 | – | 3 |
| Saint Louis | | – | | 5 | – | 5 | – | 0 |
| Lombard | | – | | 4 | – | 4 | – | 0 |
| Loyola (IL) | | – | | 4 | – | 4 | – | 0 |
| Michigan State | | – | | 4 | – | 5 | – | 0 |
| Northern Illinois State | | – | | 1 | – | 4 | – | 1 |
| Kent State | | – | | 1 | – | 5 | – | 1 |
| Valparaiso | | – | | 1 | – | 5 | – | 0 |
Rankings from Dickinson System

The 1927 Kent State Golden Flashes football team represented Kent State during the 1927 college football season. In its third season under head coach Merle E. Wagoner, Kent State compiled a 1–5–1 record and was outscored by a total of 80 to 25.

On defense, the team was markedly improved, giving up only 79 points in seven games. On offense, however, the team was shut out in five games and totaled only 25 points on the season.

During the football season, students began a band organization. "Although this effort was not as auspicious as it might have been, the seed was sown, and indications are that there will be a strong band next year."

=== Schedule ===
| Date | Opponent | Site | Result | Source |
|---|---|---|---|---|
| September 24 | at Kenyon | Gambier, OH | T 6–6 | |
| October 8 | Slippery Rock | Rockwell Field; Kent, OH | L 0–6 | |
| October 15 | Bowling Green | Rockwell Field; Kent, OH (rivalry) | L 0–13 | |
| October 22 | Cedarville | Rockwell Field; Kent, OH | W 19–18 | |
| October 29 | at Edinboro State Teachers | Edinboro, PA | L 0–6 | |
| November 12 | at Indiana (PA) | College Field; Indiana, PA | L 0–7 | |
| November 18 | at Wilmington | Wilmington, OH | L 0–24 | |

=== Roster ===
The following players participated on the 1927 team:

- Chernin;
- "Curtie" Curtiss, end
- A. Davis, end
- Chet Davis
- H. Dunlavy, guard
- Earley, guard
- W. "Ole" Fisher, halfback
- Graber, tackle
- L. Hinkle, end
- "C Major" Hinkle, guard
- "Cocky" Hinkle, fullback
- "Bob" Kelso, tackle
- Kilbourne;
- W. "Red" McCaslin, tackle
- Donald Menough, quarterback and acting captain
- "Jimmy" Menough, halfback
- "Tiny" Paulus, guard
- Pettay, guard
- "Ted" Sapp, tackle
- Jake Searl, quarterback and captain elect for 1928
- Sloop, halfback
- "Dud" Vair, end
- Claude Vair, manager

== 1928 ==
1928 Kent State Golden Flashes football
- Conference: Independent
- Record: 4–2–2
- Head coach: Merle E. Wagoner (4th season)
- Home stadium: Rockwell Field

1928 Midwestern college football independents records
| | Conf. | | | Overall |
| Team | W | L | T | W | | L | | T |
|---|---|---|---|---|---|---|---|---|
| Detroit | | – | | 9 | – | 0 | – | 0 |
| Butler | | – | | 6 | – | 2 | – | 0 |
| John Carroll | | – | | 6 | – | 3 | – | 0 |
| Kent State | | – | | 4 | – | 2 | – | 2 |
| Marquette | | – | | 5 | – | 3 | – | 1 |
| Ball Teachers | | – | | 3 | – | 2 | – | 2 |
| Notre Dame | | – | | 5 | – | 4 | – | 0 |
| DePaul | | – | | 4 | – | 4 | – | 1 |
| Haskell | | – | | 5 | – | 5 | – | 0 |
| Michigan Tech | | – | | 2 | – | 2 | – | 1 |
| Saint Louis | | – | | 4 | – | 4 | – | 1 |
| Wabash | | – | | 4 | – | 4 | – | 1 |
| Loyola (IL) | | – | | 4 | – | 4 | – | 0 |
| Lombard | | – | | 3 | – | 4 | – | 1 |
| Michigan State | | – | | 3 | – | 4 | – | 1 |
| Detroit City College | | – | | 2 | – | 5 | – | 1 |
| Valparaiso | | – | | 1 | – | 6 | – | 0 |

The 1928 Kent State Golden Flashes football team represented Kent State during the 1928 college football season. In its fourth season under head coach Merle E. Wagoner, Kent State compiled a 4–2–2 record and outscored by a total of 89 to 34.

In addition to compiling the program's first winning season, the 1928 team set programs records for points scored in a game (26 against Cedarville) and in a season (89). The team also gained 347 yards against Cedarville, which was 100 more than the team had ever gained in a previous game.

The Chestnut Burr of 1929 noted the remarkable improvement of the 1928 team, building on the prior year's fine defensive work with improved offensive output.

=== Schedule ===
| Date | Opponent | Site | Result | Source |
|---|---|---|---|---|
| September 29 | at Kenyon | Gambier, OH | W 25–6 | |
| October 6 | at John Carroll | Cleveland, OH | L 0–12 | |
| October 13 | at Defiance | Defiance, OH | T 0–0 | |
| October 20 | at Akron | Buchtel Field; Akron, OH (rivalry) | L 6–8 | |
| October 27 | Cedarville | Rockwell Field; Kent, OH | W 26–0 | |
| November 3 | Rio Grande | Rockwell Field; Kent, OH | W 13–0 | |
| November 12 | Indiana (PA) | Bowers Field; Kent, OH (Armistice Day) | W 13–0 | |
| November 24 | at Bowling Green | Bowling Green, OH (rivalry) | T 6–6 | |

=== Roster ===
The roster of the 1928 team included:

- Jack Chernin, center
- Sherman Crow, guard
- Frank Curtiss, end
- Archie Davis, end
- Willard Fisher, end
- Claude Graber, guard
- Clarence Hinkle, guard
- "Cocky" Kilbourne, fullback
- Jimmie Menough, halfback
- Ted Sapp, tackle
- "Jake" Searl, captain
- Ralph Spangler, tackle
- Arthur Stejaskal, halfback

== 1929 ==
1929 Kent State Golden Flashes football
- Conference: Independent
- Record: 1–7
- Head coach: Merle E. Wagoner (5th season)
- Home stadium: Rockwell Field

1929 Midwestern college football independents records
| | Conf. | | | Overall |
| Team | W | L | T | W | | L | | T |
|---|---|---|---|---|---|---|---|---|
| No. 1 Notre Dame | | – | | 9 | – | 0 | – | 0 |
| Detroit | | – | | 7 | – | 1 | – | 1 |
| Haskell | | – | | 8 | – | 2 | – | 0 |
| Loyola (IL) | | – | | 5 | – | 2 | – | 1 |
| Michigan State | | – | | 5 | – | 3 | – | 0 |
| John Carroll | | – | | 5 | – | 3 | – | 1 |
| Marquette | | – | | 4 | – | 3 | – | 1 |
| Butler | | – | | 4 | – | 4 | – | 0 |
| Michigan Tech | | – | | 2 | – | 2 | – | 1 |
| Wabash | | – | | 4 | – | 5 | – | 0 |
| Saint Louis | | – | | 3 | – | 4 | – | 1 |
| DePaul | | – | | 2 | – | 7 | – | 0 |
| Kent State | | – | | 1 | – | 7 | – | 0 |
| Valparaiso | | – | | 1 | – | 7 | – | 0 |
| Ball State | | – | | 0 | – | 7 | – | 0 |
Rankings from Dickinson System

The 1929 Kent State Golden Flashes football team represented Kent State during the 1929 college football season. In its fifth season under head coach Merle E. Wagoner, Kent State compiled a 1–7 record and was outscored by a total of 162 to 20.

The Chestnut Burr called the 1929 season a "building year" noting that most of the team would return for the 1930 season when Kent State would be a member of the Ohio Conference. The same publication also noted that the team's playing all but two of its games on the road, for the second straight year, was a "very regrettable feature" that put a burden on the team and deprived them of the support of the student body. The Chestnut Burr noted that the lack of home games was the result of "the lack of a suitable playing field" and called for the situation to be "remedied at once for the benefit of the entire school."

=== Schedule ===
| Date | Opponent | Site | Result | Attendance | Source |
|---|---|---|---|---|---|
| September 28 | Oberlin | Rockwell Field; Kent, OH | L 0–19 | | |
| October 5 | at Akron | Buchtel Field; Akron, OH | L 0–25 | | |
| October 12 | at Heidelberg | Tiffin, OH | L 2–25 | | |
| October 19 | at Kenyon | Gambier, OH | L 15–21 | | |
| October 25 | at John Carroll | Cleveland, OH | L 0–32 | | |
| November 11 | Rio Grande | Rockwell Field; Kent, OH (Armistice Day) | W 3–0 | 4,500 | |
| November 16 | Baldwin-Wallace | Bowers Field; Kent, OH | L 0–18 | | |
| November 23 | at Indiana (PA) | Indiana, PA | L 0–21 | | |

=== Roster ===
The roster of the 1929 Kent State football team included the following:

- Deak Abbot, tackle
- William Disbro, halfback
- Elmer Dunlevy, guard
- Frank Fanelli, guard
- Louis Fogg, guard
- Clyde Hall, end
- James Hagerdon, end
- Chas Kilbourne, fullback and honorary captain
- James Mennow, halfback
- Ted Sapp, tackle
- Ward Seacrist, end
- Jake Searl, quarterback
- Arthur Stejskal, halfback
- Kermit Taylor, guard
- Alexander Young, halfback
