= 1924 in Michigan =

- Decades: 1900s; 1910s; 1920s; 1930s; 1940s
- See also: History of Michigan; Historical outline of Michigan; List of years in Michigan; 1924 in the United States

Events from the year 1924 in Michigan.

== Office holders ==
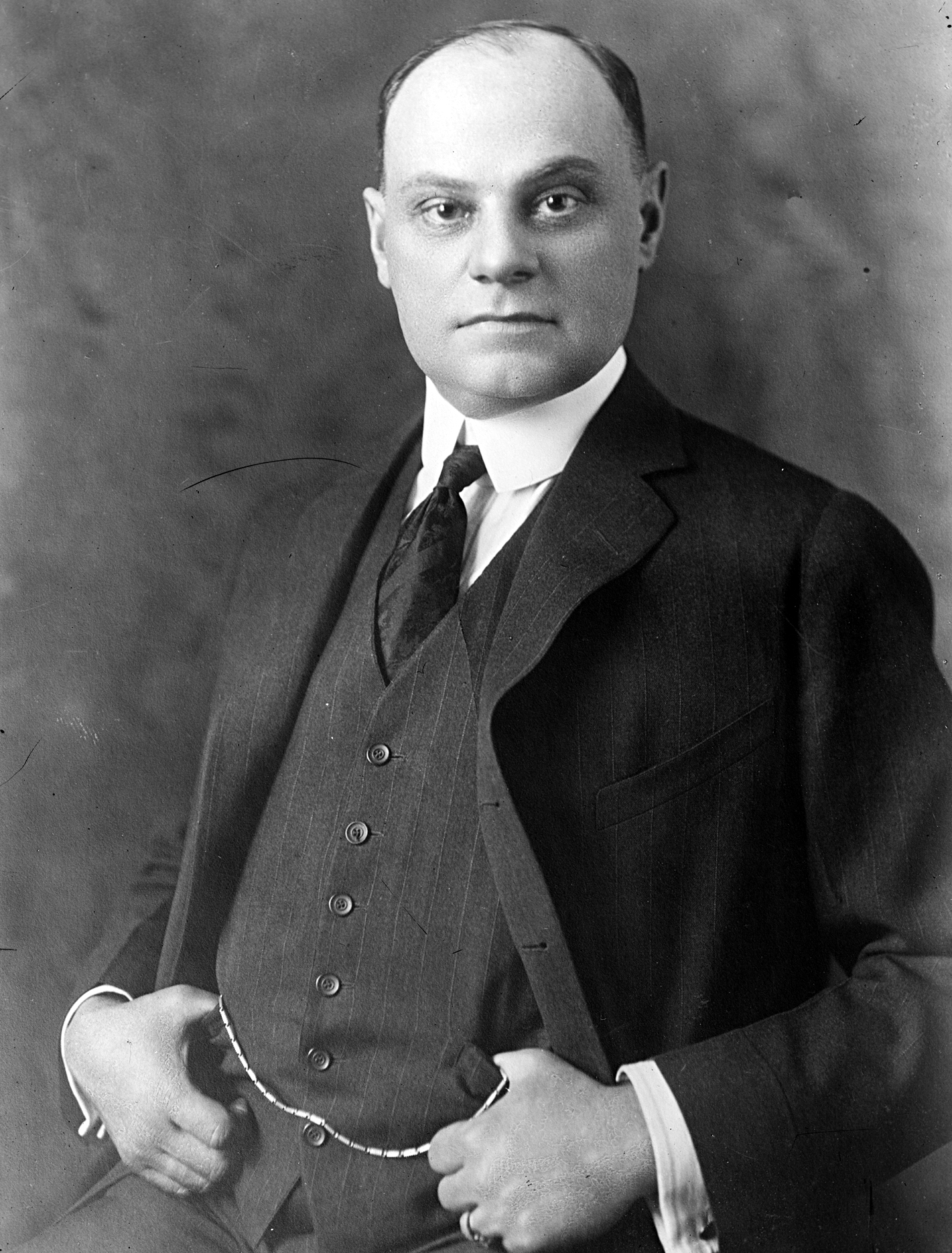
Gov. Groesbeck

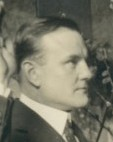
Mayor Smith

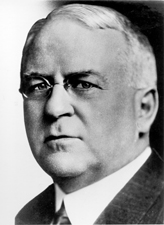
Sen. Couzens

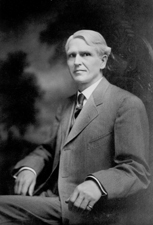
Sen. Ferris

=== State office holders ===
- Governor of Michigan: Alex J. Groesbeck (Republican)
- Lieutenant Governor of Michigan: Thomas Read (Republican)
- Michigan Attorney General: Andrew B. Dougherty (Republican)
- Michigan Secretary of State: Charles J. DeLand (Republican)
- Speaker of the Michigan House of Representatives: George W. Welsh (Republican)
- Chief Justice, Michigan Supreme Court: George M. Clark

=== Mayors of major cities ===
- Mayor of Detroit: John C. Lodge/John W. Smith
- Mayor of Grand Rapids: Julius Tisch/Elvin Swarthout
- Mayor of Flint: David R. Cuthbertson/Judson L. Transue
- Mayor of Lansing: Alfred H. Doughty
- Mayor of Saginaw: Ben N. Mercer
- Mayor of Ann Arbor: George E. Lewis

=== Federal office holders ===
- U.S. Senator from Michigan: James J. Couzens (Republican)
- U.S. Senator from Michigan: Woodbridge N. Ferris (Democrat)
- House District 1: Robert H. Clancy (Democrat)
- House District 2: Earl C. Michener (Republican)
- House District 3: Arthur B. Williams (Republican)
- House District 4: John C. Ketcham (Republican)
- House District 5: Carl E. Mapes (Republican)
- House District 6: Grant M. Hudson (Republican)
- House District 7: Louis C. Cramton (Republican)
- House District 8: Bird J. Vincent (Republican)
- House District 9: James C. McLaughlin (Republican)
- House District 10: Roy O. Woodruff (Republican)
- House District 11: Frank D. Scott (Republican)
- House District 12: W. Frank James (Republican)
- House District 13: Clarence J. McLeod (Republican)

== Population ==
In the 1920 United States census, Michigan was recorded as having a population of 3,668,412, ranking as the seventh most populous state in the country. By 1930, Michigan's population had increased by 32.0% to 4,842,325.

=== Cities ===
The following is a list of cities in Michigan with a population of at least 15,000 based on 1920 U.S. Census data. Historic census data from 1910 and 1930 is included to reflect trends in population increases or decreases.

1920 Rank	City	County	1910 Pop.	1920 Pop.	1930 Pop.	Change 1920-30
1	Detroit	Wayne	465,766	993,678	1,568,662	57.9%
2	Grand Rapids	Kent	112,571	137,634	168,592	22.5%
3	Flint	Genesee	38,550	91,599	156,492	70.8%
4	Saginaw	Saginaw	50,510	61,903	80,715	30.4%
5	Lansing	Ingham	31,229	57,327	78,397	36.8%
6	Hamtramck	Wayne	3,559	48,615	56,268	15.7%
7	Kalamazoo	Kalamazoo	39,437	48,487	54,786	13.0%
8	Jackson	Jackson	31,433	48,374	55,187	14.1%
9	Bay City	Bay	45,166	47,554	47,355	−0.4%
10	Highland Park	Wayne	4,120	46,499	52,959	13.9%
11	Muskegon	Muskegon	24,062	36,570	41,390	15.2%
12	Battle Creek	Calhoun	25,267	36,164	45,573	26.0%
13	Pontiac	Oakland	14,532	34,273	64,928	89.4%
14	Port Huron	St. Clair	18,863	25,944	31,361	20.9%
15	Ann Arbor	Washtenaw	14,817	19,516	26,944	38.1%
16	Ironwood	Gogebic	12,821	15,739	14,299	−9.1%

=== Boom cities of the 1920s ===
The 1920s saw an explosion of growth in the population of small cities near Detroit, with some communities growing more than three fold. Dearborn was the most extreme case, growing 20-fold from 2,470 to 50,358 persons.

1920 Rank	City	County	1910 Pop.	1920 Pop.	1930 Pop.	Change 1920-30
	Warren	Macomb	2,346	6,780	24,024	254.3%
	Royal Oak	Oakland	1,071	6,007	22,904	281.3%
	Ferndale	Oakland	--	2,640	20,855	690.0%
	Dearborn	Wayne	911	2,470	50,358	1,938.8%

=== Counties ===
The following is a list of counties in Michigan with populations of at least 40,000 based on 1920 U.S. Census data. Historic census data from 1910 and 1930 are included to reflect trends in population increases or decreases.

1920 Rank	County	Largest city	1910 Pop.	1920 Pop.	1930 Pop.	Change 1920-30
1	Wayne	Detroit	531,591	1,177,645	1,888,946	60.4%
2	Kent	Grand Rapids	159,145	183,041	240,511	31.4%
3	Genesee	Flint	64,555	125,668	211,641	68.4%
4	Saginaw	Saginaw	89,290	100,286	120,717	20.4%
5	Oakland	Pontiac	49,576	90,050	211,251	134.6%
6	Ingham	Lansing	53,310	81,554	116,587	43.0%
7	Calhoun	Battle Creek	56,638	72,918	87,043	19.4%
8	Houghton	Houghton	88,098	71,930	52,851	-26.5%
9	Jackson	Jackson	53,426	72,539	92,304	27.2%
10	Kalamazoo	Kalamazoo	60,327	71,225	91,368	28.3%
11	Bay	Bay City	68,238	69,548	69,474	-0.1%
12	Berrien	Niles	53,622	62,653	81,066	29.4%
13	Muskegon	Muskegon	40,577	62,362	84,630	35.7%
14	St. Clair	Port Huron	52,341	58,009	67,563	16.5%
15	Washtenaw	Ann Arbor	44,714	49,520	65,530	32.3%
16	Lenawee	Adrian	47,907	47,767	49,849	4.4%
17	Ottawa	Holland	45,301	47,660	54,858	15.1%
18	Marquette	Marquette	46,739	45,786	44,076	−3.7%

== Sports ==
=== Baseball ===
- 1924 Detroit Tigers season – Under player-manager Ty Cobb, the Tigers compiled an 82–72 record and finished third in the American League. The team's statistical leaders included Johnny Bassler with a .346 batting average, Harry Heilmann with 10 home runs and 114 RBIs, and Cobb with 211 hits. Earl Whitehill led the pitching staff with a 17–9 record and 233 innings pitched.
- 1924 Michigan Wolverines baseball season –

=== American football ===
- 1924 Michigan Wolverines football team – Under head coach George Little, the Wolverines compiled a 6–2 record, outscored opponents by a combined score of 155 to 54, and finished fourth in the Big Ten Conference. Quarterback Tod Rockwell led the team in scoring.
- 1924 Michigan State Spartans football team – Under head coach Ralph H. Young, the Spartans compiled a 5–3 record.
- 1924 Michigan State Normal Normalites football team – Under head coach James Brown, the Normalites compiled a 2–5–1 record.
- 1924 Detroit Titans football team – Under head coach James F. Duffy, the Titans finished with a 4–5 record.
- 1924 Central Michigan Normalites football team – Under head coach Lester Barnard, the Central Michigan football team compiled a 7–1 record.
- 1924 Western State Hilltoppers football team – Under head coach Earl Martineau, the Hilltoppers compiled a 5–1–1 record.

=== Basketball ===
- 1923–24 Michigan Wolverines men's basketball team – Under head coach E. J. Mather, the Wolverines compiled a 10–7 record. Howard M. Birks was the team captain.

=== Ice hockey ===
- 1923–24 Michigan Wolverines men's ice hockey team –

=== Other ===
- Michigan Open

== Chronology of events ==
=== November ===
- November 4 - A number of elections occurred, including:
  - President of the United States - Incumbent president Calvin Coolidge won in Michigan with 75.37% of the popular vote.
  - United States Senate - Incumbent Republican United States Senator James J. Couzens was for the first time elected to the Senate after being appointed to fill the vacancy left by Truman Handy Newberry's resignation in 1922.
  - United States House of Representatives - All of Michigan's 13 U.S. Representatives won re-election except for Democrat Robert H. Clancy, who was defeated by Republican John B. Sosnowski, making Michigan's delegation to the House entirely Republican.
  - Michigan Governor - Incumbent Republican governor, Alex J. Groesbeck, defeated Democratic nominee Edward Frensdorf.
  - Michigan House of Representatives - Cora Reynolds Anderson became the first woman and the first Native American to be elected to the state House.

== Births ==
- January 1 – Arthur Danto, art critic and professor, in Ann Arbor, MI
- January 31 – A. Alfred Taubman, businessman, in Pontiac, MI
- March 6 – Ed Mierkowicz, baseball outfielder, in Wyandotte, MI
- April 18 – Connie Binsfeld, 60th Lieutenant Governor of Michigan, in Munising, MI
- May 3 – Isadore Singer, mathematician, in Detroit
- June 3 – Jay Van Andel, co-founder of Amway, in Grand Rapids, MI
- July 10 – Major Holley, jazz upright bassist, in Detroit
- July 22 – Margaret Whiting, singer, in Detroit
- July 23 – Avern Cohn, federal judge, in Detroit
- October 15 – Lee Iacocca, automobile executive, in Allentown, PA
- December 6 – Dorothy Comstock Riley, lawyer and judge, in Detroit
- December 31 – Frank J. Kelley, Michigan Attorney General (1961–1999), in Detroit

== Deaths ==
- May 11 - Moses Fleetwood Walker, first African-American to play MLB and a U-M alumnus, at age 67 in Cleveland
- August 3 - Charles E. Townsend, United States Senator from Michigan (1911-1923), at age 67 in Jackson
- August 25 - John Owen, set world record in 100-yard dash, at age 63 in a horseback riding accident on Mackinac Island

=== Gallery of 1924 deaths ===
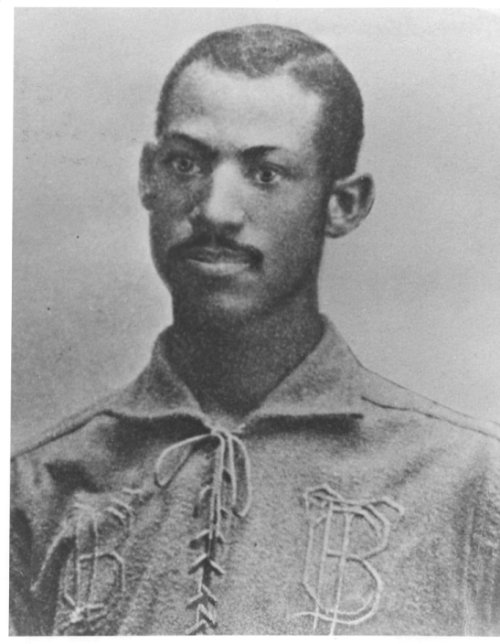
Moses Fleetwood Walker
