= List of Kent State Golden Flashes football seasons =

This is a list of seasons completed by the Kent State Golden Flashes football team of the National Collegiate Athletic Association (NCAA) Division I Football Bowl Subdivision (FBS). (Note: The Division I-A, I-AA and I-AAA designations were confusing and as a result, misapplied by the public, boosters and media when referring not only to their local football programs but also to other sports such as basketball. The Division I Board of Directors, composed of Division I presidents and chancellors voted on the change in August 2006. The Football Bowl Subdivision (formerly I-A) includes those programs that compete in an effort to participate in the postseason bowl system. The NCAA Football Championship Subdivision (formerly I-AA) includes those programs that compete in an effort to participate in the NCAA championship postseason structure (one of the 88 NCAA national championships). NCAA.org) Kent State fielded their first team in 1920 coached by Paul G. Chandler and are currently coached by Mark Carney. They complete in the Mid-American Conference and the East division. They were previously a member of the Ohio Athletic Conference from 1932 through 1950.

== Seasons ==
Legend

^{†} National Champions
^{‡} Conference Champions
^{#} Division Champions
^ Bowl game berth (Note: The yellow color is used only when Kent State reaches a bowl but does not hold a share in the conference title. In any case that Kent State has a share of the conference championship, the green color is used.)
* Playoff berth (Note: The blue color is used only when Kent State receives a playoff berth but does not hold a share in the conference title. In any case that Kent State has a share of the conference championship, the green color is used.)

Season	Coach	Conference	Conference Results				Season Results			Postseason result	Final Ranking	
Season	Coach	Conference	Finish	Wins	Losses	Ties	Wins	Losses	Ties (Note: Overtime rules in college football were introduced in 1996, making ties impossible.)	Postseason result	AP (Note: The Associated Press began conducting a weekly college football poll in 1936.)	Coaches' (Note: The college football coaches' poll has been sponsored by multiple organizations since its creation in 1950. Its current sponsor is USA Today.)
Kent State Golden Flashes
1920	Paul G. Chandler	Independent	—	—	—	—	1	2	0	—		
1921	Paul G. Chandler	Independent	—	—	—	—	0	2	1	—		
1922	Paul G. Chandler	Independent	—	—	—	—	0	7	—	—		
1923	Frank Harsh	Independent	—	—	—	—	0	5	0	—		
1924	Frank Harsh	Independent	—	—	—	—	0	4	0	—		
1925	Merle E. Wagoner	Independent	—	—	—	—	1	1	3	—		
1926	Merle E. Wagoner	Independent	—	—	—	—	2	6	0	—		
1927	Merle E. Wagoner	Independent	—	—	—	—	1	5	1	—		
1928	Merle E. Wagoner	Independent	—	—	—	—	4	2	2	—		
1929	Merle E. Wagoner	Independent	—	—	—	—	1	7	1	—		
1930	Merle E. Wagoner	Independent	—	—	—	—	3	3	1	—		
1931	Merle E. Wagoner	Independent	—	—	—	—	3	4	0	—		
1932	Merle E. Wagoner	Ohio Athletic Conference	18th	5	2	0	5	2	0	—		
1933	Joe Begala	Ohio Athletic Conference	T–9th	2	2	3	2	2	3	—		
1934	Joe Begala	Ohio Athletic Conference	11th	2	3	3	2	2	3	—		
1935	Donald Starn	Ohio Athletic Conference	16th	2	5	0	3	5	0	—		
1936	Donald Starn	Ohio Athletic Conference	6th	4	2	0	5	4	0	—		
1937	Donald Starn	Ohio Athletic Conference	9th	3	3	1	3	4	4	—		
1938	Donald Starn	Ohio Athletic Conference	T–8th	3	2	0	6	2	0	—		
1939	Donald Starn	Ohio Athletic Conference	13th	1	3	1	3	4	1	—		
1940	Donald Starn	Ohio Athletic Conference	2nd	4	0	0	8	1	0	—		
1941	Donald Starn	Ohio Athletic Conference	12th	1	3	0	2	5	1	—		
1942	Donald Starn	Ohio Athletic Conference	7th	1	1	0	5	2	0	—		
1943	Kent State did not play football during the 1943, 1944 and 1945 seasons because of World War II											
1944	Kent State did not play football during the 1943, 1944 and 1945 seasons because of World War II											
1945	Kent State did not play football during the 1943, 1944 and 1945 seasons because of World War II											
1946	Trevor J. Rees	Ohio Athletic Conference	9th	1	1	0	6	2	0	—		
1947	Trevor J. Rees	Ohio Athletic Conference	T–5th	2	1	0	4	4	0	—		
1948	Trevor J. Rees	Ohio Athletic Conference	3rd	3	0	0	6	2	1	—		
1949	Trevor J. Rees	Ohio Athletic Conference	3rd	2	0	0	5	3	0	—		
1950	Trevor J. Rees	Ohio Athletic Conference	7th	2	1	0	5	4	0	—		
1951	Trevor J. Rees	Mid-American Conference	3rd	2	1	0	4	3	2	—		
1952	Trevor J. Rees	Mid-American Conference	T–4th	2	2	0	5	4	0	—		
1953	Trevor J. Rees	Mid-American Conference	3rd	3	1	0	7	2	0	—		
1954^{^}	Trevor J. Rees	Mid-American Conference	2nd	7	1	0	8	2	0	Lost Refrigerator Bowl to Delaware Fightin' Blue Hens, 7–19		
1955	Trevor J. Rees	Mid-American Conference	T–2nd	4	1	1	6	2	1	—		
1956	Trevor J. Rees	Mid-American Conference	3rd	4	2	0	7	2	0	—		
1957	Trevor J. Rees	Mid-American Conference	7th	1	5	0	3	6	0	—		
1958	Trevor J. Rees	Mid-American Conference	2nd	5	1	7	2	0	0	—		
1959	Trevor J. Rees	Mid-American Conference	T–4th	3	3	0	5	3	0	—		
1960	Trevor J. Rees	Mid-American Conference	3rd	4	2	0	6	3	0	—		
1961	Trevor J. Rees	Mid-American Conference	7th	1	5	0	2	8	0	—		
1962	Trevor J. Rees	Mid-American Conference	5th	2	4	0	3	6	0	—		
1963	Trevor J. Rees	Mid-American Conference	T–6th	1	5	0	3	5	1	—		
1964	Leo Strang	Mid-American Conference	6th	1	4	1	3	3	1	—		
1965	Leo Strang	Mid-American Conference	T–3rd	3	2	1	5	4	1	—		
1966	Leo Strang	Mid-American Conference	5th	2	4	0	4	6	0	—		
1967	Leo Strang	Mid-American Conference	6th	1	5	0	4	6	0	—		
1968	Dave Puddington	Mid-American Conference	6th	1	5	0	1	9	0	—		
1969	Dave Puddington	Mid-American Conference	T–5th	1	4	0	5	5	0	—		
1970	Dave Puddington	Mid-American Conference	T–5th	1	4	0	3	7	0	—		
1971	Don James	Mid-American Conference	6th	0	5	0	3	8	0	—		
1972^{‡^}	Don James	Mid-American Conference	1st	4	1	0	6	5	1	Lost Tangerine Bowl to Tampa Spartans, 18–21		
1973	Don James	Mid-American Conference	2nd	4	1	0	9	2	0	—		
1974	Don James	Mid-American Conference	T–4th	2	3	0	7	4	0	—		
1975	Dennis Fitzgerald	Mid-American Conference	8th	1	6	0	4	7	0	—		
1976	Dennis Fitzgerald	Mid-American Conference	T–2nd	6	2	0	8	4	0	—		
1977	Dennis Fitzgerald	Mid-American Conference	6th	5	4	0	6	5	0	—		
1978	Ron Blackledge	Mid-American Conference	8th	2	6	0	4	7	0	—		
1979	Ron Blackledge	Mid-American Conference	10th	1	8	0	1	10	0	—		
1980	Ron Blackledge	Mid-American Conference	T–8th	3	6	0	3	8	0	—		
1981	Ed Chlebek	Mid-American Conference	7th	3	6	0	4	7	0	—		
1982	Ed Chlebek	Mid-American Conference	10th	0	9	0	0	11	0	—		
1983	Dick Scesniak	Mid-American Conference	9th	1	8	0	1	10	0	—		
1984	Dick Scesniak	Mid-American Conference	T–8th	3	6	0	4	7	0	—		
1985	Dick Scesniak	Mid-American Conference	9th	2	6	0	3	8	0	—		
1986	Glen Mason	Mid-American Conference	T–2nd	5	3	0	5	6	0	—		
1987	Glen Mason	Mid-American Conference	T–2nd	5	3	0	7	4	0	—		
1988	Dick Crum	Mid-American Conference	7th	3	5	0	5	6	0	—		
1989	Dick Crum	Mid-American Conference	9th	0	8	0	0	11	0	—		
1990	Dick Crum	Mid-American Conference	T–7th	2	6	0	2	9	0	—		
1991	Pete Cordelli	Mid-American Conference	9th	1	7	0	1	10	0	—		
1992	Pete Cordelli	Mid-American Conference	8th	2	7	0	2	9	0	—		
1993	Pete Cordelli	Mid-American Conference	10th	0	9	0	0	11	0	—		
1994	Jim Corrigall	Mid-American Conference	8th	2	7	0	2	9	0	—		
1995	Jim Corrigall	Mid-American Conference	10th	0	7	1	1	9	1	—		
1996	Jim Corrigall	Mid-American Conference	10th	1	7	—	2	9	—	—		
1997	Jim Corrigall	Mid-American Conference	T–4th (East)	3	5	—	3	8	—	—		
1998	Dean Pees	Mid-American Conference	6th (East)	0	8	—	0	11	—	—		
1999	Dean Pees	Mid-American Conference	6th (East)	2	6	—	2	9	—	—		
2000	Dean Pees	Mid-American Conference	7th (East)	1	7	—	1	10	—	—		
2001	Dean Pees	Mid-American Conference	T–3rd (East)	5	3	—	6	5	—	—		
2002	Dean Pees	Mid-American Conference	6th (East)	1	7	—	3	9	—	—		
2003	Dean Pees	Mid-American Conference	4th (East)	4	4	—	5	7	—	—		
2004	Doug Martin	Mid-American Conference	4th (East)	4	4	—	5	6	—	—		
2005	Doug Martin	Mid-American Conference	6th (East)	0	8	—	1	10	—	—		
2006	Doug Martin	Mid-American Conference	2nd (East)	5	3	—	6	6	—	—		
2007	Doug Martin	Mid-American Conference	7th (East)	1	7	—	3	9	—	—		
2008	Doug Martin	Mid-American Conference	T–4th (East)	3	5	—	4	8	—	—		
2009	Doug Martin	Mid-American Conference	4th (East)	4	4	—	5	7	—	—		
2010	Doug Martin	Mid-American Conference	4th (East)	4	4	—	5	7	—	—		
2011	Darrell Hazell	Mid-American Conference	3rd (East)	4	4	—	5	7	—	—		
2012^{#^}	Darrell Hazell	Mid-American Conference	1st (East)	8	0	—	11	3	—	Lost MAC Championship Game to Northern Illinois Huskies, 37–44; Lost GoDaddy.com Bowl to Arkansas State Red Wolves, 13–17		
2013	Paul Haynes	Mid-American Conference	5th (East)	3	5	—	4	8	—	—		
2014	Paul Haynes	Mid-American Conference	7th (East)	1	6	—	2	9	—	—		
2015	Paul Haynes	Mid-American Conference	T-5th (East)	2	6	—	3	9	—	—		
2016	Paul Haynes	Mid-American Conference	5th (East)	2	6	—	3	9	—	—		
2017	Paul Haynes	Mid-American Conference	6th (East)	1	7	—	2	10	—	—		
2018	Sean Lewis	Mid-American Conference	6th (East)	1	7	—	2	10	—	—		
2019	Sean Lewis	Mid-American Conference	T-2nd (East)	5	3	—	7	6	—	Won Frisco Bowl over Utah State Aggies, 51–41		
2020	Sean Lewis	Mid-American Conference	T-2nd (East)	3	1	—	3	1	—	—		
2021	Sean Lewis	Mid-American Conference	1st (East)	6	2	—	7	7	—	Lost MAC Championship Game to Northern Illinois Huskies, 23-41; Lost Famous Idaho Potato Bowl to Wyoming Cowboys, 38-52		
2022	Sean Lewis	Mid-American Conference	T-4th (East)	4	4	—	5	7	—	—		
2023	Kenni Burns	Mid-American Conference	6th (East)	0	8	—	1	11	—	—		
2024	Kenni Burns	Mid-American Conference	12th	0	8	—	0	12	—	—		
2025	Mark Carney	Mid-American Conference	T–6th	4	4	—	5	7	—	—		
Total				—	—	—	369	604	28	(only includes regular season games)		
Total				33	32	10	—	—	—	(only includes Ohio Athletic Conference games)		
Total				184	337	4	—	—	—	(only includes Mid-American Conference games)		
Total				—	—	—	1	5	0	(only includes post-season games; 6 appearances)		
Total				217	369	14	370	611	28	(all games)		
♦ Denotes a tie for first place and conference co-champion

== See also ==
- Kent State Golden Flashes
