= List of Kent State Golden Flashes men's basketball head coaches =

The following is a list of Kent State Golden Flashes men's basketball head coaches. There have been 24 head coaches of the Golden Flashes in their 107-season history.

Kent State's current head coach is Rob Senderoff. He was hired as the Golden Flashes' head coach in April 2011, replacing Geno Ford, who left to become the head coach at Bradley.

No.	Tenure	Coach	Years	Record	Pct.
1	1913–1915	Alexander Whyte	2	10–4	.714
2	1915–1917	Donald Ulrich	2	6–14	.300
3	1919–1923	Paul G. Chandler	4	11–24	.314
4	1923–1925	Frank Harsh	2	8–17	.320
5	1925–1933	Merle E. Wagoner	8	43–81	.347
6	1933–1935	Gus Peterka	2	13–15	.464
7	1935–1943	Donald Starn	8	98–81	.547
8	1944–1946	William A. Satterlee	2	13–21	.382
9	1946–1948	Harry C. Adams	2	28–19	.596
10	1948–1951; 1955–1957	David E. McDowell	5	71–49	.592
11	1951–1955	Clarence Haerr	4	37–52	.416
12	1957–1961	Bill Bertka	4	36–57	.387
13	1961–1966	Robert F. Doll	5	33–77	.300
14	1966–1974	Frank Truitt	8	74–121	.379
15	1974–1978 (Note: Hughes was fired in January 1978. Mike Boyd served as interim head coach for the remainder of the 1977–78 season.)	Rex Hughes	4	27–63	.300
16	1978*	Mike Boyd	1	5–11	.313
17	1978–1982	Ed Douma	4	40–66	.377
18	1982–1992	Jim McDonald	10	148–139	.516
19	1992–1996	Dave Grube	4	45–63	.417
20	1996–2001	Gary Waters	5	92–60	.605
21	2001–2002	Stan Heath	1	30–6	.833
22	2002–2008	Jim Christian	6	138–58	.704
23	2008–2011	Geno Ford	3	68–37	.648
24	2011–present	Rob Senderoff	12	247–147	.627
Totals		24 coaches	107 seasons	1,321–1,282	.507
Records updated through end of 2022–23 season * - Denotes interim head coach. Source
