= Paul Chandler =

Paul Chandler may refer to:

- Paul Chandler (hostage), British man kidnapped with his wife in 2009 and taken to Somalia
- Paul G. Chandler (educator) (1889–1986), American football, basketball and baseball coach, educator, and college president
- Paul G. Chandler (author), author and former Episcopal bishop
