= 1924–25 Kent State Silver Foxes men's basketball team =

American college basketball season

1924–25 Kent State Silver Foxes men's basketball
- Conference: Independent
- Record: 4–8
- Head coach: Frank Harsh (2nd season)

The 1924–25 Kent State Silver Foxes men's basketball team was the men's basketball team at what is now Kent State University in Kent, Ohio, then known as Kent State Normal College.

The men's basketball team played 12 games in late 1924 and early 1925, finishing with a record of 4–8. It was the second year for coach Frank Harsh.

Ted Huge served as team captain with M.A. Walcott as manager. Starters comprised Huge, John Shedden, August Peterka, Howard Shepard, Glenn Francis, Edward Evans, Eugene Feeley, William Cowan and Ben Schroeder, with Herman Chapman, Walter Kirm, Samuel Pliskin, as reserves.

This was the last season in which practice and home games were held off-campus. The new Wills Gymnasium was under construction and would open later in 1925. Until the new facility was ready, practices and games would be held at various locations as they had been since the founding of the basketball team in 1913, such as the atrium of the original Administration Building (known as Cartwright Hall since 2006), in the basement of the original heating plant, in the local Congregational Church gymnasium, and at Kent Roosevelt High School.

== Schedule and results ==
Date time, TV	Opponent	Result	Record	Site city, state
*	at Western Reserve	L 14–21	0–1	Adelbert Gymnasium; Cleveland, OH
*	Western Reserve	L 20–25	0–2	Kent, OH
*	Hiram	L 18–48	0–3	
*	at Slippery Rock	L 23–38	0–4	Slippery Rock, PA
*	Ashland	L 31–40	0–5	
January 24, 1925*	at Defiance	L 26–35	0–6	Sisson Gymnasium; Defiance, OH
*	Spencerian	W 41–11	1–6	Cleveland, OH
February 10, 1925*	Davey Institute	W 51–30	2–6	Kent, OH
*	Davey Institute	L 15–17	2–7	Kent, OH
*	Hiram	L 28–37	2–8	
March 4, 1925*	Slippery Rock	W 32–31	3–8	Kent, OH
*	Spencerian	W 41–40 ^{4OT}	4–8	Kent Roosevelt High; Kent, OH
*Non-conference game. (#) Tournament seedings in parentheses. Sources

== See also ==
- List of Kent State Golden Flashes men's basketball seasons
