= Ray Sermon =

American football and basketball player and coach (1893–1965)

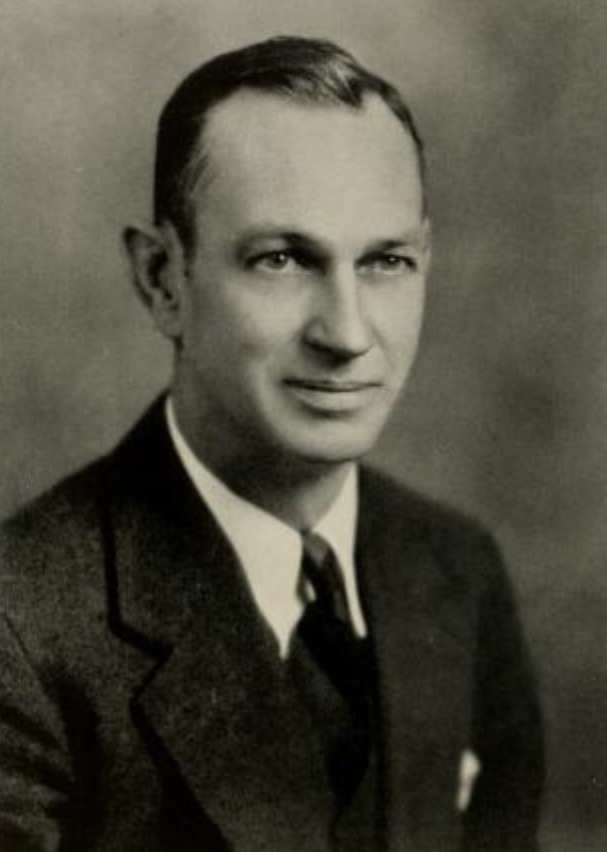
- Sermon at NC State in 1940

Biographical details
- Born: March 1, 1893; Independence, Missouri, U.S.
- Died: October 12, 1965 (aged 72); Raleigh, North Carolina, U.S.

Playing career

Football
- 1911–1913: Warrensburg
- 1915–1916: Springfield
- 1921–1923: Kirksville Osteopaths
- Position: Quarterback (football)

Coaching career (HC unless noted)

Football
- 1914: Wentworth Military Academy (MO)
- 1917: Central (MO)
- 1918–1919: Missouri Mines
- 1921–1924: Kirksville Osteopaths
- 1925: NC State (backfield)

Basketball
- 1921–1925: Kirksville Osteopaths
- 1930–1940: NC State

Administrative career (AD unless noted)
- 1931–1937: NC State

Head coaching record
- Overall: 27–17–1 (college football)

Raymond Rollins Sermon (March 1, 1893 – October 12, 1965) was an American college football, college basketball, college baseball, and track coach and college athletics administrator. He served as the head football coach at Central College—now known as Central Methodist University—in Fayette, Missouri in 1917 and Missouri School of Mines and Metallurgy—now known as Missouri University of Science and Technology—in Rolla, Missouri from 1918 to 1919, and Kirksville Osteopathy College—renamed from A.T. Still College of Osteopathy and Surgery in 1924 and now known as A.T. Still University—in Kirksville, Missouri from 1921 to 1924.

Sermon attended Warrensburg Teachers College—now known as the University of Central Missouri, where he was captain of the football, basketball, baseball, and track teams. As a quarterback in football, he was named to the "All Missouri" team in 1913. Sermon coached at Wentworth Military Academy in Lexington, Missouri during the 1914–15 academic year. He then attended the International YMCA College—now known as Springfield College—in Springfield, Massachusetts, playing on the football team in 1915 and 1916.

At Kirksville Osteopath, Sermon also played on the football team for three years and coached basketball, baseball, and golf. He left Kirksville in 1925 to become the backfield coach for the football team at North Carolina State University.

Sermon served as the head men's basketball at NC State from 1930 to 1940.

Sermon died on October 12, 1965.

== Head coaching record ==
=== College football ===
Year	Team	Overall	Conference	Standing	Bowl/playoffs
Central Eagles (Independent) (1917)
1917	Central	4–2			
Central:		4–2			
Missouri Mines Miners (Independent) (1918)
1918	Missouri Mines	1–2			
Missouri Mines Miners (Missouri Intercollegiate Athletic Association) (1919)
1919	Missouri Mines	3–5	2–2	T–5th	
Missouri Mines:		4–7	2–2		
Kirksville Osteopaths (Independent) (1921–1924)
1921	Kirksville Osteopaths	6–1			
1922	Kirksville Osteopaths	5–3			
1923	Kirksville Osteopaths	2–4–1			
1924	Kirksville Osteopaths	6–0			
Kirksville Osteopaths:		19–8–1			
Total:		27–17–1			
