= Billy Williams (coach) =

American sports coach and college athletics administrator

- Williams pictured in Orient 1925, Ball State yearbook

Biographical details
- Born: August 8, 1892; Sullivan County, Indiana, U.S.
- Died: July 14, 1973 (aged 80); Muncie, Indiana, U.S.
- Education: Indiana State

Coaching career (HC unless noted)

Football
- 1924–1925: Muncie State

Basketball
- 1922–1925: Muncie State

Baseball
- 1922–1926: Muncie State
- 1928–1958: Ball Teachers / Ball State

Administrative career (AD unless noted)
- 1921–1958: Muncie State / Ball Teachers / Ball State

Head coaching record
- Overall: 3–8 (football); 36–34–1 (basketball); 207–228–4 (baseball)

Paul Beauchamp "Billy" Williams (August 8, 1892 – July 14, 1973) was an American football, basketball, and baseball coach and college athletics administrator. He served as the head football coach at Muncie State Normal School—now known as Ball State University from 1924 to 1925, compiling a record of 3–8. He was the Ball Teachers College's head basketball from 1922 to 1925, tallying a mark of 36–34–1, and the school's head baseball coach from 1922 to 1926 and from 1928 to 1958, amassing a record of 207–228–4. In addition, Williams served as the school's athletic director from 1921 until 1958. He died on July 14, 1973, at a nursing home in Muncie, Indiana.

== Head coaching record ==
=== Football ===
Year	Team	Overall	Conference	Standing	Bowl/playoffs
Muncie Normal Hoosieroons (Independent) (1924–1925)
1924	Muncie Normal	1–3			
1925	Muncie Normal	2–5			
Muncie Normal:		3–8			
Total:		3–8			
