= 1924 Kent State Silver Foxes football team =

American college football season

1924 Kent State Silver Foxes football
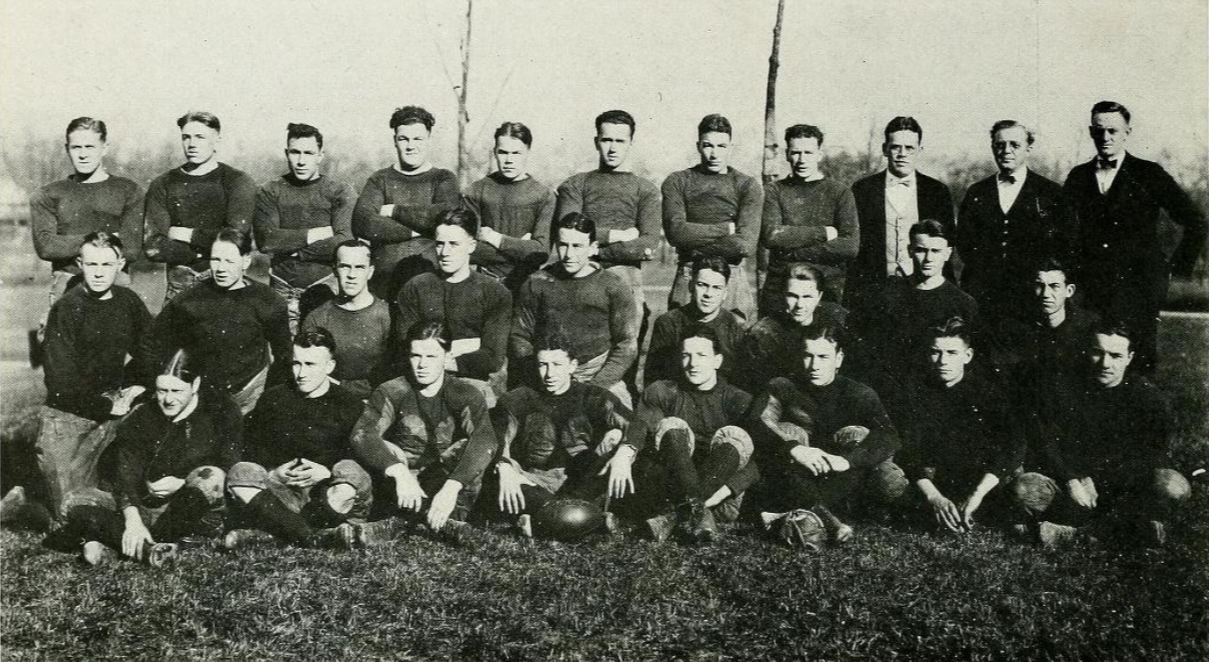
- Conference: Independent
- Record: 0–4
- Head coach: Frank Harsh (2nd season)
- Home stadium: Rockwell Field

1924 Midwestern college football independents records
	Conf.			Overall
Team	W	L	T	W		L		T
No. 1 Notre Dame		–		10	–	0	–	0
Kirksville Osteopaths		–		6	–	0	–	0
Central Michigan		–		7	–	1	–	0
Western State Normal		–		6	–	1	–	0
John Carroll		–		7	–	2	–	0
Haskell		–		7	–	2	–	1
Indiana State		–		6	–	2	–	0
Loyola (IL)		–		5	–	2	–	2
Marquette		–		5	–	2	–	0
Dayton		–		7	–	3	–	0
Saint Louis		–		6	–	3	–	0
Michigan Agricultural		–		5	–	3	–	0
Wabash		–		5	–	4	–	0
Butler		–		4	–	5	–	0
Detroit		–		4	–	5	–	0
Muncie Normal		–		1	–	3	–	0
Michigan Mines		–		0	–	2	–	1
Kent State		–		0	–	4	–	0
Rankings from Dickinson System

The 1924 Kent State Silver Foxes football team represented Kent State during the 1924 college football season. In its second season under head coach Frank Harsh, Kent State compiled a 0–4 record and was outscored 89 to 0. In two seasons under coach Harsh, the team lost all nine games and scored a total of six points.

The Chestnut Burr for 1925 summarized the 1924 football season as follows:

UNWEPT, UNHONORED AND UNSUNG, the football team of Kent State College battered through the 1924 season with no victories. The lusty bark of the Silver Fox pack, however, never lost its strength and even though pitted against superior odds at each fight, defeat was the last word to be said. . . . But now the season is over. Instead of blaming anyone for the results a Kent State is united stronger than ever, greater than before, and the spirit that soothed and sustained the founders lives yet in its students and great things yet will be heard of the college who "always lost."

== Schedule ==
Date	Opponent	Site	Result	Source
	Indiana (PA)	Rockwell Field; Kent, OH	L 0–29	
	at Ashland	Ashland	L 0–20	
	Hiram	Rockwell Field; Kent, OH	L 0–14	
	at West Virginia State Normal	West Liberty, WV	L 0–26	
