= James M. Brown (coach) =

American sports coach (1892–1965)

Biographical details
- Born: January 13, 1892
- Died: September 1, 1965 (aged 73); Ann Arbor, Michigan, U.S.

Playing career

Football
- 1912: Colgate

Coaching career (HC unless noted)

Football
- 1919: Detroit (assistant)
- 1923–1924: Michigan State Normal

Basketball
- 1919–1922: Detroit

Head coaching record
- Overall: 4–10–2 (football); 24–28 (basketball)

James M. "Bingo" Brown (January 13, 1892 – September 1, 1965) was an American football, basketball, and baseball coach. He served as the head football coach at Michigan State Normal College—now known as Eastern Michigan University—from 1923 to 1924, compiling a record of 4–10–2. He was also the head basketball coach at the University of Detroit—now known as the University of Detroit Mercy—from 1919 to 1922, tallying a mark of 24–28.

Brown attended Colgate University, where he played college football before graduating in 1916. During World War I, he served as an infantry lieutenant in the United States Army, seeing action during the Meuse-Argonne Offensive. At the University of Detroit, he also served as an assistant football coach under head coach James F. Duffy. Brown died at the age of 73, on September 1, 1965, at St. Joseph Hospital in Ann Arbor, Michigan.

== Head coaching record ==
=== Football ===
Year	Team	Overall	Conference	Standing	Bowl/playoffs
Michigan State Normal Normalites (Michigan Intercollegiate Athletic Association) (1923–1924)
1923	Michigan State Normal	2–5–1	1–3–1	T–4th	
1924	Michigan State Normal	2–5–1	2–3	4th	
Michigan State Normal:		4–10–2	4–6–1		
Total:		4–10–2			
