= 1924 Wabash Little Giants football team =

American college football season

1924 Wabash Little Giants football
- Conference: Independent
- Record: 5–4
- Head coach: Robert E. Vaughan (6th season)

1924 Midwestern college football independents records
	Conf.			Overall
Team	W	L	T	W		L		T
No. 1 Notre Dame		–		10	–	0	–	0
Kirksville Osteopaths		–		6	–	0	–	0
Central Michigan		–		7	–	1	–	0
Western State Normal		–		6	–	1	–	0
John Carroll		–		7	–	2	–	0
Haskell		–		7	–	2	–	1
Indiana State		–		6	–	2	–	0
Loyola (IL)		–		5	–	2	–	2
Marquette		–		5	–	2	–	0
Dayton		–		7	–	3	–	0
Saint Louis		–		6	–	3	–	0
Michigan Agricultural		–		5	–	3	–	0
Wabash		–		5	–	4	–	0
Butler		–		4	–	5	–	0
Detroit		–		4	–	5	–	0
Muncie Normal		–		1	–	3	–	0
Michigan Mines		–		0	–	2	–	1
Kent State		–		0	–	4	–	0
Rankings from Dickinson System

The 1924 Wabash Little Giants football team represented Wabash College as an independent during the 1924 college football season. Led by sixth-year head coach Robert E. Vaughan, the Little Giants compiled a record of 5–4.

== Schedule ==
Date	Opponent	Site	Result	Attendance	Source
September 27	at Purdue	Stuart Field; West Lafayette, IN	L 7–21		
October 3	Monmouth (IL)	Crawfordsville, IN	W 26–7		
October 11	at Notre Dame	Cartier Field; Notre Dame, IN	L 0–34	13,000	
October 18	Hanover	Crawfordsville, IN	W 7–0		
October 25	at Butler	Indianapolis, IN	L 0–12		
November 1	Franklin (IN)	Crawfordsville, IN	W 23–7		
November 10	Chicago YMCA College	Crawfordsville, IN	W 34–6		
November 15	at Indiana	Jordan Field; Bloomington, IN	L 7–21		
November 22	at DePauw	Greencastle, IN	W 21–0		
