= 1924 Saint Louis Billikens football team =

American college football season

1924 Saint Louis Billikens football
- Conference: Independent
- Record: 6–3
- Head coach: Dan J. Savage (2nd season)
- Home stadium: St. Louis University Athletic Field

1924 Midwestern college football independents records
	Conf.			Overall
Team	W	L	T	W		L		T
No. 1 Notre Dame		–		10	–	0	–	0
Kirksville Osteopaths		–		6	–	0	–	0
Central Michigan		–		7	–	1	–	0
Western State Normal		–		6	–	1	–	0
John Carroll		–		7	–	2	–	0
Haskell		–		7	–	2	–	1
Indiana State		–		6	–	2	–	0
Loyola (IL)		–		5	–	2	–	2
Marquette		–		5	–	2	–	0
Dayton		–		7	–	3	–	0
Saint Louis		–		6	–	3	–	0
Michigan Agricultural		–		5	–	3	–	0
Wabash		–		5	–	4	–	0
Butler		–		4	–	5	–	0
Detroit		–		4	–	5	–	0
Muncie Normal		–		1	–	3	–	0
Michigan Mines		–		0	–	2	–	1
Kent State		–		0	–	4	–	0
Rankings from Dickinson System

The 1924 Saint Louis Billikens football team was an American football team that represented Saint Louis University as an independent during the 1924 college football season. In their second season under head coach Dan J. Savage, the Billikens compiled a 6–3 record and outscored their opponents, 110 to 90. The team played its home games at St. Louis University Athletic Field on the school's campus in St. Louis.

== Schedule ==
Date	Opponent	Site	Result	Source
September 27	Southwest Missouri State	St. Louis University Athletic Field; St. Louis, MO	W 8–0	
October 4	at Army	Michie Stadium; West Point, NY	L 0–17	
October 11	Missouri Mines	St. Louis University Athletic Field; St. Louis, MO	W 24–14	
October 18	Loyola (IL)	St. Louis University Athletic Field; St. Louis, MO	W 13–7	
October 25	Detroit	St. Louis University Athletic Field; St. Louis, MO	L 7–13	
November 1	St. Xavier	St. Louis University Athletic Field; St. Louis, MO	W 18–7	
November 8	Michigan Agricultural	St. Louis University Athletic Field; St. Louis, MO	W 9–3	
November 15	Oglethorpe	St. Louis University Athletic Field; St. Louis, MO	W 18–6	
November 27	Centenary	St. Louis University Athletic Field; St. Louis, MO	L 13–23	
