= James F. Duffy =

American football player and coach (1892–1961)

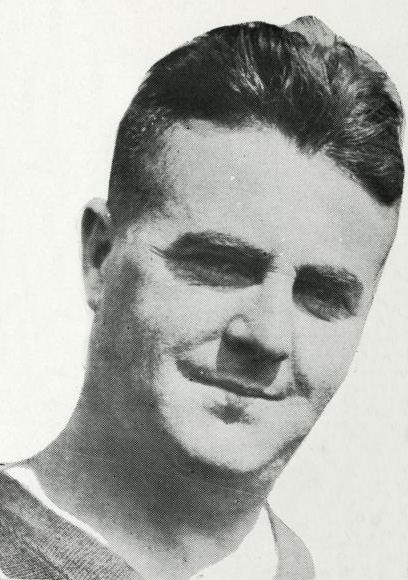
- Duffy pictured in The Red and White 1923, Detroit yearbook

Biographical details
- Born: June 3, 1892; Pittsfield, Massachusetts, U.S.
- Died: February 23, 1961 (aged 68); Detroit, Michigan, U.S.

Playing career
- c. 1915: Colgate
- Position(s): Quarterback

Coaching career (HC unless noted)
- c. 1915: Colgate (assistant)
- 1916: Eastern HS (MI)
- 1917: Detroit
- 1919–1922: Detroit
- 1924: Detroit

Head coaching record
- Overall: 43–12–1 (college)

James Francis Duffy Jr. (June 3, 1892 – February 23, 1961) was an American football player and coach. A Massachusetts native, Duffy played college football as a quarterback at Colgate University. He was the head coach of the University of Detroit football team for six seasons between 1917 and 1924 and led the program to national prominence. His coaching career was interrupted by one year of military service during World War I and by his retirement after the 1922 season. In his first five years as the team's head coach, his teams compiled a 39–7–1 record. He returned to coaching in 1924 and sustained the only losing record of his career. After retiring from football, Duffy practiced law and served for a time as Michigan's boxing commissioner.

== Early years ==
Duffy was born in Pittsfield, Massachusetts, in 1892. He was the son of James F. Duffy Sr. and Helen W. Duffy. He attended preparatory school at the Tilton School in New Hampshire and later attended Colgate University where he was a quarterback for the football team. He suffered a broken collarbone and became an assistant coach on the Colgate football team.

In 1916, Duffy accepted a position as the football coach at Eastern High School in Detroit.

== University of Detroit ==
In August 1917, following the sudden resignation of Gil Dobie, Duffy was hired as the football coach at the University of Detroit.

In his first year as head coach, Duffy led the 1917 team to an 8–1 record. In his first game, Detroit defeated Toledo by a 145–0 score that stands as the school's single-game scoring record. The team's only loss in 1917 was to Fielding H. Yost's Michigan Wolverines by a 14–3 score.

Duffy missed the University of Detroit's 1918 season due to wartime military service. In the spring of 1918, Duffy enlisted in the United States Navy and was stationed at the Cleveland Naval Station, Great Lakes Naval Station, and Pelham Bay. He was commissioned as an ensign.

After being discharged from the Navy, Duffy returned to the University of Detroit as athletic director. He also coached the football team and led the 1919 team to an 8–1 record. His team recorded five shutouts and outscored all opponents, 257 to 30.

Duffy continued to lead the football team to winning records in 1920 (8–2), 1921 (8–1), and 1922 (7–2–1). His 1921 team was undefeated in the regular season but lost to fellow undefeated Washington & Jefferson in a postseason playoff game to determine which team would play in the 1922 Rose Bowl. Washington & Jefferson went on to win the Rose Bowl and has been recognized as the co-national champion for 1921.

After the 1922 season, Duffy retired as the school's head football coach in order to begin a law practice. In March 1924, Durfy agreed to return for one year in his old position. His 1924 team compiled a 4–5 record.

In six seasons as head coach, Duffy compiled a record of 43–12–1, giving him the highest winning percentage (.777) of any coach in Detroit Titans history. His 43 wins ranks second in school history behind Gus Dorais. During Duffy's time as the school's head coach, the team was "ranked among the country's gridiron giants."

Duffy's players at the University of Detroit included Father Celestin J. Steiner who later became the university's chancellor and federal judge Thomas Patrick Thornton. More than 20 of Duffy's players went on to play in the National Football League (NFL), including Tillie Voss (nine years in the NFL), Gus Sonnenberg (eight years in the NFL), Eddie Moegle (scored the first touchdown for a Detroit NFL team), Walt Clago (played in the NFL on Sundays while serving on the Detroit Police Department), and Dutch Lauer (four years in the NFL).

== Later years ==
Duffy received a law degree from the University of Detroit. He began his law practice in 1923 at Denby, Kennedy & O'Brien. In 1933, he was appointed by Gov. William Comstock to the State Athletic Board of Control as Michigan's boxing commissioner. At the time, the Detroit Free Press described him as "a chunky grey-eyed nervous little man 'with the map of Ireland stamped upon his face.'"

Duffy did not marry. He died at the Detroit Veterans' Hospital in Detroit in 1961.

== Head coaching record ==
=== College ===
Year	Team	Overall	Conference	Standing	Bowl/playoffs
Detroit Tigers (Independent) (1917)
1917	Detroit	8–1			
Detroit Titans (Independent) (1919–1922)
1919	Detroit	8–1			
1920	Detroit	8–2			
1921	Detroit	8–1			
1922	Detroit	7–2–1			
Detroit Titans (Independent) (1924)
1924	Detroit	4–5			
Detroit:		43–12–1			
Total:		43–12–1			
