= 1924 Kirksville Osteopaths football team =

American college football season

1924 Kirksville Osteopaths football
- Conference: Independent
- Record: 6–0
- Head coach: Ray Sermon (4th season)
- Home stadium: Teachers College Stadium

1924 Midwestern college football independents records
	Conf.			Overall
Team	W	L	T	W		L		T
No. 1 Notre Dame		–		10	–	0	–	0
Kirksville Osteopaths		–		6	–	0	–	0
Central Michigan		–		7	–	1	–	0
Western State Normal		–		6	–	1	–	0
John Carroll		–		7	–	2	–	0
Haskell		–		7	–	2	–	1
Indiana State		–		6	–	2	–	0
Loyola (IL)		–		5	–	2	–	2
Marquette		–		5	–	2	–	0
Dayton		–		7	–	3	–	0
Saint Louis		–		6	–	3	–	0
Michigan Agricultural		–		5	–	3	–	0
Wabash		–		5	–	4	–	0
Butler		–		4	–	5	–	0
Detroit		–		4	–	5	–	0
Muncie Normal		–		1	–	3	–	0
Michigan Mines		–		0	–	2	–	1
Kent State		–		0	–	4	–	0
Rankings from Dickinson System

The 1924 Kirksville Osteopaths football team was an American football team that represented Kirksville Osteopathy College—now known as A.T. Still University—as an independent during the 1924 college football season. Led by Ray Sermon in his fourth and final year as head coach, the team compiled a perfect record 6–0.

== Schedule ==
Date	Time	Opponent	Site	Result	Source
October 11	3:00 p.m.	Missouri Military Academy	Teachers College Stadium; Kirksville, MO	W 25–7	
October 17	2:30 p.m.	Kemper Military Academy	Teachers College Stadium; Kirksville, MO	W 20–3	
October 24		Kirksville	Kirksville, MO	W 25–0	
November 1	2:30 p.m.	Warrensburg	Teachers College Stadium; Kirksville, MO	W 27–7	
November 6		Wentworth Military Academy	Kirksville, MO	W 51–0	
November 27		at St. Benedict's	Atchison, KS	W 7–3	
All times are in Central time
