= 1924 Dayton Flyers football team =

American college football season

1924 Dayton Flyers football
- Conference: Independent
- Record: 7–3
- Head coach: Harry Baujan (2nd season)
- Home stadium: Varsity Field

1924 Midwestern college football independents records
	Conf.			Overall
Team	W	L	T	W		L		T
No. 1 Notre Dame		–		10	–	0	–	0
Kirksville Osteopaths		–		6	–	0	–	0
Central Michigan		–		7	–	1	–	0
Western State Normal		–		6	–	1	–	0
John Carroll		–		7	–	2	–	0
Haskell		–		7	–	2	–	1
Indiana State		–		6	–	2	–	0
Loyola (IL)		–		5	–	2	–	2
Marquette		–		5	–	2	–	0
Dayton		–		7	–	3	–	0
Saint Louis		–		6	–	3	–	0
Michigan Agricultural		–		5	–	3	–	0
Wabash		–		5	–	4	–	0
Butler		–		4	–	5	–	0
Detroit		–		4	–	5	–	0
Muncie Normal		–		1	–	3	–	0
Michigan Mines		–		0	–	2	–	1
Kent State		–		0	–	4	–	0
Rankings from Dickinson System

The 1924 Dayton Flyers football team was an American football team that represented the University of Dayton as an independent during the 1924 college football season. In its second season under head coach Harry Baujan, the team compiled a 7–3 record.

== Schedule ==
Date	Opponent	Site	Result	Source
September 27	at Carnegie Tech	Tech Bowl; Pittsburgh, PA	L 3–14	
October 4	Rio Grande	Varsity Field; Dayton, OH	W 64–0	
October 11	Davis & Elkins	Varsity Field; Dayton, OH	W 27–7	
October 18	Duquesne	Varsity Field; Dayton, OH	W 28–0	
October 25	Loyola of Chicago	Varsity Field; Dayton, OH	L 6–7	
November 1	at Cincinnati	Carson Field; Cincinnati, OH	W 21–0	
November 8	Toledo	Varsity Field; Dayton, OH	W 52–6	
November 15	at Canisius	Buffalo, NY	L 13–14	
November 22	John Carroll	Varsity Field; Dayton, OH	W 20–6	
November 27	Wilmington	Wilmington, OH	W 27–0	
