= 1924 Marquette Golden Avalanche football team =

American college football season

1924 Marquette Golden Avalanche football
- Conference: Independent
- Record: 5–2
- Head coach: Frank Murray (3rd season)
- Captain: Dilweg
- Home stadium: Marquette Stadium

1924 Midwestern college football independents records
	Conf.			Overall
Team	W	L	T	W		L		T
No. 1 Notre Dame		–		10	–	0	–	0
Kirksville Osteopaths		–		6	–	0	–	0
Central Michigan		–		7	–	1	–	0
Western State Normal		–		6	–	1	–	0
John Carroll		–		7	–	2	–	0
Haskell		–		7	–	2	–	1
Indiana State		–		6	–	2	–	0
Loyola (IL)		–		5	–	2	–	2
Marquette		–		5	–	2	–	0
Dayton		–		7	–	3	–	0
Saint Louis		–		6	–	3	–	0
Michigan Agricultural		–		5	–	3	–	0
Wabash		–		5	–	4	–	0
Butler		–		4	–	5	–	0
Detroit		–		4	–	5	–	0
Muncie Normal		–		1	–	3	–	0
Michigan Mines		–		0	–	2	–	1
Kent State		–		0	–	4	–	0
Rankings from Dickinson System

The 1924 Marquette Golden Avalanche football team was an American football team that represented Marquette University as an independent during the 1924 college football season. In its third season under head coach Frank Murray, the team compiled a 5–2 record.

== Schedule ==
Date	Opponent	Site	Result	Attendance	Source
October 4	Saint Mary's (MN)	Milwaukee, WI	W 26–0		
October 11	at Navy	Farragut Field; Annapolis, MD	W 21–3		
October 18	John Carroll	Marquette Stadium; Milwaukee, WI	W 10–3		
November 1	Creighton	Marquette Stadium; Milwaukee, WI	L 7–21	15,000	
November 8	at Boston College	Braves Field; Boston, MA	L 7–34	14,000	
November 16	North Dakota	Marquette Stadium; Milwaukee, WI	W 26–0		
November 27	Vermont	Marquette Stadium; Milwaukee, WI	W 61–7	12,000	
