= 1924 Muncie Normal Hoosieroons football team =

American college football season

1924 Muncie Normal Hoosieroons football
- Conference: Independent
- Record: 1–3
- Head coach: Billy Williams (1st season)
- Home stadium: Normal Field

1924 Midwestern college football independents records
	Conf.			Overall
Team	W	L	T	W		L		T
No. 1 Notre Dame		–		10	–	0	–	0
Kirksville Osteopaths		–		6	–	0	–	0
Central Michigan		–		7	–	1	–	0
Western State Normal		–		6	–	1	–	0
John Carroll		–		7	–	2	–	0
Haskell		–		7	–	2	–	1
Indiana State		–		6	–	2	–	0
Loyola (IL)		–		5	–	2	–	2
Marquette		–		5	–	2	–	0
Dayton		–		7	–	3	–	0
Saint Louis		–		6	–	3	–	0
Michigan Agricultural		–		5	–	3	–	0
Wabash		–		5	–	4	–	0
Butler		–		4	–	5	–	0
Detroit		–		4	–	5	–	0
Muncie Normal		–		1	–	3	–	0
Michigan Mines		–		0	–	2	–	1
Kent State		–		0	–	4	–	0
Rankings from Dickinson System

The 1924 Ball Teachers Hoosieroons football team was an American football team that represented Muncie State Normal School (later renamed Ball State University) during the 1924 college football season. In the first season in school history, the team compiled a 1–3 record and was outscored by a total of 11 to 87. The team played its home games at Normal Field in Muncie, Indiana. Their coach was Billy Williams.

== Schedule ==
Date	Opponent	Site	Result
October 18	at Indiana State	Terre Haute, IN	L 0–47
October 31	at Indiana Central	Indianapolis, IN	L 2–13
November 7	Central Normal	Normal Field; Muncie, IN	W 9–6
November 22	at Earlham	Richmond, IN	L 0–21
