= Lester Barnard =

American sports coach (1894–1985)

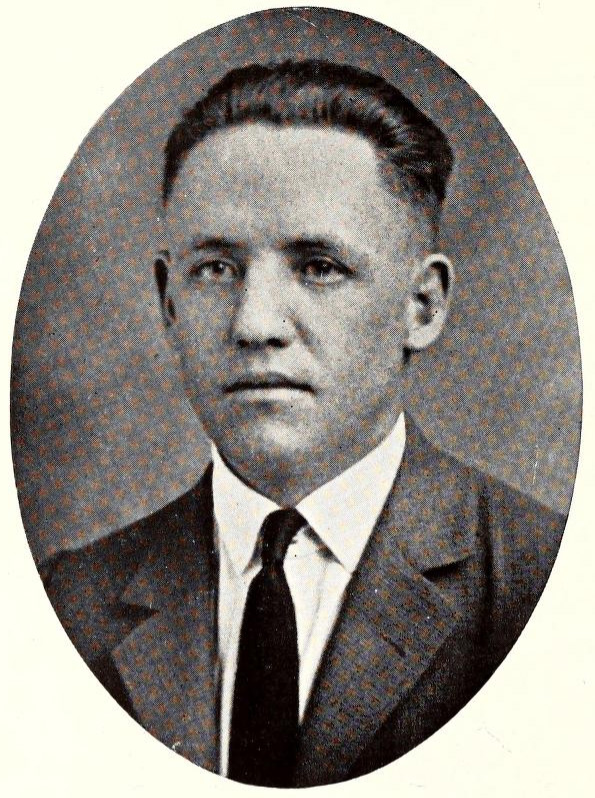
- Barnard pictured in The DeSoto 1923, Memphis yearbook

Biographical details
- Born: October 25, 1894; Rogersville, Missouri, U.S.
- Died: June 1, 1985 (aged 90); Orange County, California, U.S.

Playing career

Football
- 1913–1916: Springfield Normal
- 1918: Great Lakes Navy
- 1919: Northwestern

Basketball
- 1913–1917: Springfield Normal
- Position: End (football)

Coaching career (HC unless noted)

Football
- 1920–1921: Okmulgee HS (OK)
- 1922–1923: West Tennessee State Normal
- 1924–1925: Central Michigan
- 1928–1957: South HS (MN)

Basketball
- 1920–1922: Okmulgee HS (OK)
- 1922–1924: West Tennessee State Normal
- 1924–1926: Central Michigan

Baseball
- 1924: West Tennessee

Head coaching record
- Overall: 22–7–6 (college football); 22–37 (college basketball)

Lester Smith Barnard (October 25, 1894 – June 1, 1985) was an American football, basketball, baseball, and track coach. He served as the head football coach at West Tennessee Normal State School—now known as the University of Memphis—from 1922 to 1923 and Central Michigan University from 1924 to 1925, compiling a career college football coaching record of 22–7–6. Barnard was also the head basketball coach at West Tennessee from 1922 to 1924 and Central Michigan from 1924 to 1926, tallying a career college basketball mark of 22–37. He was a twin brother of Chester S. Barnard. In 1985, he died at the age of 90 in California.

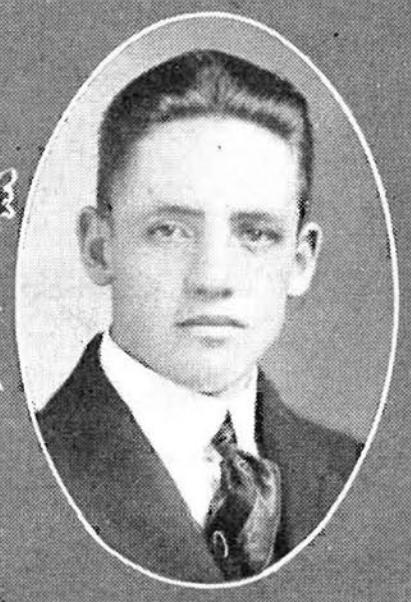
Barnard pictured in Ozarko 1916, Missouri State yearbook (while attending the college)

== Head coaching record ==
=== College football ===
Year	Team	Overall	Conference	Standing	Bowl/playoffs
West Tennessee State Normal (Independent) (1922)
1922	West Tennessee State Normal	5–2–3			
1923	West Tennessee State Normal	6–3			
West Tennessee State Normal:		11–5–3			
Central Michigan Normalites/Dragons (Independent) (1924–1925)
1924	Central Michigan	7–1			
1925	Central Michigan	4–1–3			
Central Michigan:		11–2–3			
Total:		22–7–6			
