= 1924 Michigan State Normal Normalites football team =

American college football season

1924 Michigan State Normal Normalites football
- Conference: Michigan Intercollegiate Athletic Association
- Record: 2–5–1 (2–3 MIAA)
- Head coach: James M. Brown (2nd season)
- Captain: Elwood A. Watson

1924 Michigan Intercollegiate Athletic Association football standings
	Conf.					Overall
Team	W		L		T	W		L		T
Hillsdale $	5	–	0	–	0	6	–	1	–	1
Albion	4	–	1	–	0	6	–	3	–	0
Alma	3	–	2	–	0	3	–	5	–	0
Michigan State Normal	2	–	3	–	0	2	–	5	–	1
Olivet	1	–	4	–	0	2	–	6	–	0
Kalamazoo	0	–	5	–	0	2	–	6	–	0
$ – Conference champion

The 1924 Michigan State Normal Normalites football team was an American football team that represented Michigan State Normal College (later renamed Eastern Michigan University) as a member of the Michigan Intercollegiate Athletic Association (MIAA) during the 1924 college football season. In their second and final season under head coach James M. Brown, the Normalites compiled a 2–5–1 record and were outscored by a total of 69 to 46. Elwood A. Watson was the team captain.

== Schedule ==
Date	Opponent	Site	Result	Source
September 27	at Adrian*	Adrian, MI	T 7–7	
October 4	Toledo*	Ypsilanti, MI	L 0–7	
October 11	at Hillsdale	Hillsdale, MI	L 13–14	
October 18	at Alma	Alma, MI	L 0–9	
October 25	Central Michigan*	Ypsilanti, MI (rivalry)	L 0–13	
November 1	Kalamazoo	Ypsilanti, MI	W 14–0	
November 15	at Albion	Albion, MI	L 0–13	
November 22	Olivet	Ypsilanti, MI	W 12–6	
*Non-conference game
