= 1924 Haskell Indians football team =

American college football season

1924 Haskell Indians football
- Conference: Independent
- Record: 7–2–1
- Head coach: Dick Hanley (3rd season)
- Captain: Ansel Carpenter (aka White Weasel)
- Home stadium: Haskell Field

1924 Midwestern college football independents records
	Conf.			Overall
Team	W	L	T	W		L		T
No. 1 Notre Dame		–		10	–	0	–	0
Kirksville Osteopaths		–		6	–	0	–	0
Central Michigan		–		7	–	1	–	0
Western State Normal		–		6	–	1	–	0
John Carroll		–		7	–	2	–	0
Haskell		–		7	–	2	–	1
Indiana State		–		6	–	2	–	0
Loyola (IL)		–		5	–	2	–	2
Marquette		–		5	–	2	–	0
Dayton		–		7	–	3	–	0
Saint Louis		–		6	–	3	–	0
Michigan Agricultural		–		5	–	3	–	0
Wabash		–		5	–	4	–	0
Butler		–		4	–	5	–	0
Detroit		–		4	–	5	–	0
Muncie Normal		–		1	–	3	–	0
Michigan Mines		–		0	–	2	–	1
Kent State		–		0	–	4	–	0
Rankings from Dickinson System

The 1924 Haskell Indians football team was an American football team that represented the Haskell Institute (later renamed Haskell Indian Nations University) as an independent during the 1924 college football season. In its third season under head coach Dick Hanley, the team compiled a 7–2–1 record and outscored opponents by a total of 219 to 70.

Three Haskell players were selected by Leslie Edmonds of the Topeka Capital as first-team players on his 1924 All-Kansas football team: John Levi at fullback and Theodore "Tiny" Roebuck and Jack Norton, aka Charging Skunk, at the guard positions. In addition, George Levi was selected to the second team at the halfback position. John Levi was described as "the greatest Indian football players since the days of Jim Thorpe."

== Schedule ==
Date	Time	Opponent	Site	Result	Attendance	Source
September 27		Des Moines Still College	Haskell Field; Lawrence, KS	W 12–0		
October 4		at Tulsa	McNulty Park; Tulsa, OK	W 26–3		
October 11		at Minnesota	Memorial Stadium; Minneapolis, MN	L 0–20	18,000	
October 18		Midland	Haskell Field; Lawrence, KS	W 28–0		
October 25		at Creighton	Western League Park; Omaha, NE	T 7–7	9,000	
November 1	2:00 p.m.	at Boston College	Braves Field; Boston, MA	L 7–34	30,000	
November 8		at Brown	Andrews Field; Providence, RI	W 17–13		
November 22		at Butler	Indianapolis, IN	W 20–7		
November 27		at St. Xavier	Corcoran Field; Cincinnati, OH	W 47–6		
December 6		vs. Oklahoma Baptist	Muskogee, OK	W 55–0		

== Roster ==
Team photo of the 1924 Haskell Indians football team.
