= 1924 Detroit Titans football team =

American college football season

1924 Detroit Titans football
- Conference: Independent
- Record: 4–5
- Head coach: James F. Duffy (6th season)
- Home stadium: University of Detroit Stadium

1924 Midwestern college football independents records
	Conf.			Overall
Team	W	L	T	W		L		T
No. 1 Notre Dame		–		10	–	0	–	0
Kirksville Osteopaths		–		6	–	0	–	0
Central Michigan		–		7	–	1	–	0
Western State Normal		–		6	–	1	–	0
John Carroll		–		7	–	2	–	0
Haskell		–		7	–	2	–	1
Indiana State		–		6	–	2	–	0
Loyola (IL)		–		5	–	2	–	2
Marquette		–		5	–	2	–	0
Dayton		–		7	–	3	–	0
Saint Louis		–		6	–	3	–	0
Michigan Agricultural		–		5	–	3	–	0
Wabash		–		5	–	4	–	0
Butler		–		4	–	5	–	0
Detroit		–		4	–	5	–	0
Muncie Normal		–		1	–	3	–	0
Michigan Mines		–		0	–	2	–	1
Kent State		–		0	–	4	–	0
Rankings from Dickinson System

The 1924 Detroit Titans football team represented the University of Detroit as an independent during the 1924 college football season. The Titans compiled a 4–5 record and were outscored by opponents by a combined total of 120 to 94.

After retiring as the University of Detroit's head football coach at the end of the 1922 season, James F. Duffy began a law practice. In March 1924, Durfy agreed to return for one year in his old position. Duffy's assistant coaches in 1924 were Steamer Horning (line coach), John Barrett, and Dutch Lauer. Tom Maher was the team captain.

The 1924 season was the program's first with a losing record since the war-shortened 1918 season.

== Schedule ==
Date	Opponent	Site	Result	Source
September 27	Alma	University of Detroit Stadium; Detroit, MI	W 19–13	
October 4	Ohio Wesleyan	University of Detroit Stadium; Detroit, MI	L 0–3	
October 11	Army	Michie Stadium; West Point, NY	L 0–20	
October 18	Columbia (IA)	University of Detroit Stadium; Detroit, MI	W 19–3	
October 25	at Saint Louis	St. Louis University Athletic Field; St. Louis, MO	W 13–7	
November 1	Washington & Jefferson	University of Detroit Stadium; Detroit, MI	L 6–18	
November 8	John Carroll	University of Detroit Stadium; Detroit, MI	L 7–10	
November 15	Quantico Marines	University of Detroit Stadium; Detroit, MI	L 0–28	
November 27	Toronto	University of Detroit Stadium; Detroit, MI	W 30–18	
