= Rockwell Field (Kent State) =

Sports Field

- Aerial of Kent State University in the early 1930s with Rockwell Field visible at bottom center
- Interactive map of Rockwell Field
- Former names: Normal Field
- Location: Kent, Ohio, United States
- Coordinates: 41°09′03″N 81°20′44″W
- Owner: Kent State University
- Operator: Kent State University
- Capacity: 3,000
- Surface: Natural grass

Construction
- Opened: 1920
- Closed: 1941

Tenants
- Kent State Golden Flashes (NCAA); Football (1920–1940); Baseball (1920–1941); Men's track and field (1922–1941)

Rockwell Field was a multi-purpose athletic field on the campus of Kent State University in Kent, Ohio, United States. It was the first home venue for the Kent State Golden Flashes football and the first permanent home for the KSU baseball program. The field, sometimes referred to as "Normal Field", also hosted football games for the Kent State University School. Rockwell Field served as the home field for Kent State football from the team's inception in 1920 through the 1940 season, the baseball team from circa 1920 through the 1941 season, and the men's track team from their foundation in 1922 through the 1940 season. It was replaced by a new athletic complex that included a field for football with a track and an adjacent baseball field. The new football field and track, later to become Memorial Stadium by 1950, were ready for the 1941 football and 1942 track seasons, while the baseball field opened in 1942.

After the removal of intercollegiate athletics, Rockwell Field continued to be used for intramural sports and general recreation, becoming known as the Rockwell Commons and eventually as simply "the Commons". Growth and developments at Kent State during the 1940s led to additional changes to the site, such as adjacent buildings, roads, and sidewalks, as the campus expanded, making the field centrally located after originally having been on the edge of campus. In 1970, the Commons became associated with the Kent State shootings as the site of several student protests in the late 1960s and on the day of the shooting. It was included in the historic district added to the National Register of Historic Places in 2010 and made a National Historic Landmark in 2017. Although no physical reminders of the field's usage for intercollegiate athletics remain, it continues to be used as a gathering place and for general recreation.

== History ==
Baseball game or practice at Rockwell in the 1930s. Merrill Hall, the original heating plant, and Lowry Hall can be seen in the background

A dedicated athletic field was not part of the original plans for the Kent State Normal School, established in 1910. The first classes were held at the Kent campus in 1913 and intramural and informal athletic teams were formed that year and in early 1914. The school's first president, John McGilvrey, believed in the importance of physical education, but in the form of intramural athletics as opposed to intercollegiate athletics. As a result, athletic facilities were not included in the original plans for the school and attempts to acquire funds from the state to construct them were initially unsuccessful. The men's basketball team was established in 1913 and played their first collegiate game in January 1915. The baseball team was founded in 1914 and played a limited schedule, with a summer team forming during the summer terms. Baseball games were held on an informal field in the area of campus now largely occupied by Rockwell Hall. Early yearbooks expressed hope for better facilities and the reality that the lack of them hampered the development of intercollegiate athletics.

Rockwell Field was the first permanent athletic facility at Kent State, followed by Wills Gymnasium in 1925. It was named for David Ladd Rockwell, a member of the Board of Trustees at the time and one of the key members of the delegation that secured the school for Kent in 1910. Rockwell also served as mayor of the city of Kent from 1900 to 1908. Rockwell Hall, opened in 1929 as the school's first library building, is also named after him. The area where Rockwell Field was built had previously been a hilly and wooded area on the southern edge of the campus. It was located behind Merrill and Lowry Halls and adjacent to the school's heating plant, which opened in 1916. In 1938, a new women's dormitory, Engleman Hall, was built just north of the field.

View of the KSU Marching Band at Rockwell Field in 1936. The original heating plant and Merrill Hall can be seen in the background

The first football team to play at Kent State was that of the university's high school program, which began play in 1917. Early games were held across town at DePeyster Field, the new home of crosstown rival Kent High School. The university, then still a normal school, first attempted to establish a football team in 1914, but only two practice games were held before the athletic board and faculty voted to discontinue the season. The first collegiate football game at Rockwell Field was held November 6, 1920, a 7–0 loss to Bowling Green. The final intercollegiate football game at Rockwell Field was played October 12, 1940, a 26–0 homecoming win over Mount Union, attended by a reported crowd of approximately 5,000. Both the baseball and track and field teams remained at Rockwell Field for their respective 1941 seasons, beginning play at their new facilities in 1942.

== Facilities ==
View of the field in 1925 prior to bleachers being installed

The playing surface ran southwest to northeast and was encircled by a primitive running track. The field was plagued by poor sod and drainage issues and was often described as being rocky or sandy. Seating for spectators consisted of a few rows of wooden bleachers along each sideline. The football team found it difficult to schedule home games as opposing teams did not want to play on the surface. The student newspaper, the Kentonian, called the field an embarrassment.

The Flashes enjoyed three consecutive undefeated seasons at Rockwell Field, from 1929 through the 1931 season. During the 1920s, there were no seating areas for fans, so many would park their cars around the perimeter of the field and watch, or they would stand and follow the team as it progressed down the field. During the 1930s, limited bleacher seating was built and additional bleacher seating was added for almost 1,000 fans in time for the 1933 season, increasing seating capacity to approximately 3,000.

In 1941, new athletic fields were completed in the area of campus just south of Rockwell Field along Summit Street that had previously been known as the College Farm. Although the baseball field was completed in time for the 1941 season, the grass had not taken root, so the baseball team continued to use Rockwell Field for an additional season. The new athletic fields included separate football and baseball fields with a cinder track around the football field. Memorial Stadium was built around the football field nine years later in 1950, replacing the original wooden stands.

== Site ==
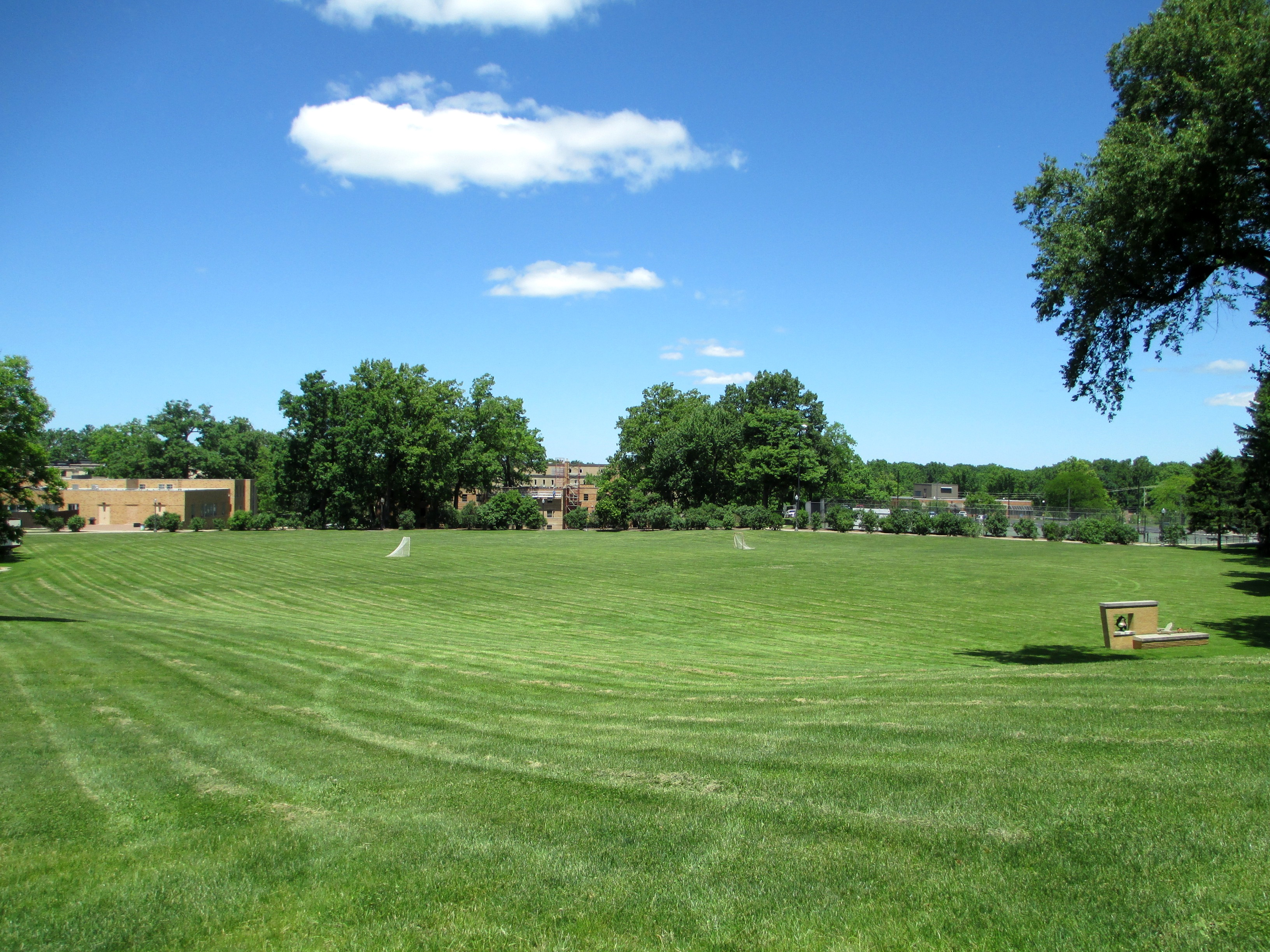
Site of Rockwell Field in 2014, now known as the Commons

After the opening of the new athletic fields in 1941 and 1942, Rockwell Field became known as the Rockwell Commons and the university's first student union was built adjacent to the field in 1949. Parking was already a growing problem in the 1940s, so a debate over the use of Rockwell Field took place with some calling for it to be used for parking, while others favored using it for intramural sports. As the university continued to develop, the western ends of Rockwell Field were used for parking and buildings, though most of it remained an open field known simply as "the Commons". Prefabricated structures were built on the western end of the area after World War II, including the building that later housed the Reserve Officers' Training Corps (ROTC). Roads and parking built for the adjacent heating plant and the Art Building occupy the southwestern part of the field area.

The Commons has since become associated with the Kent State shootings and forms a large part of the May 4, 1970, Kent State Shootings Site, which was listed on the National Register of Historic Places in 2010 and made a National Historic Landmark in 2017. On the southern edge of the Commons is the Victory Bell, which was placed there in 1950 after being donated by a local railroad. While it was originally rung following KSU football victories, it became associated first with the antiwar movement of the 1960s and ultimately with the events surrounding the Kent State shootings as it was rung to announce the start of demonstrations. It is still rung every May 4 at 12:24pm, the moment of the shootings, to honor those who were killed or injured. The Commons was the site of several protests in the 1960s and into 1970, including those just prior to the shootings on May 4, with the ROTC building burned down by arsonists on May 2, 1970. The Commons continues to be used for general recreation, and is also the site or the annual commemoration of the Kent State shootings.
