= 1924 Loyola University Chicago football team =

American college football season

1924 Loyola University Chicago football
- Conference: Independent
- Record: 5–2–2
- Head coach: Roger Kiley (2nd season)
- Home stadium: Loyola Field

1924 Midwestern college football independents records
	Conf.			Overall
Team	W	L	T	W		L		T
No. 1 Notre Dame		–		10	–	0	–	0
Kirksville Osteopaths		–		6	–	0	–	0
Central Michigan		–		7	–	1	–	0
Western State Normal		–		6	–	1	–	0
John Carroll		–		7	–	2	–	0
Haskell		–		7	–	2	–	1
Indiana State		–		6	–	2	–	0
Loyola (IL)		–		5	–	2	–	2
Marquette		–		5	–	2	–	0
Dayton		–		7	–	3	–	0
Saint Louis		–		6	–	3	–	0
Michigan Agricultural		–		5	–	3	–	0
Wabash		–		5	–	4	–	0
Butler		–		4	–	5	–	0
Detroit		–		4	–	5	–	0
Muncie Normal		–		1	–	3	–	0
Michigan Mines		–		0	–	2	–	1
Kent State		–		0	–	4	–	0
Rankings from Dickinson System

The 1924 Loyola University Chicago football team was an American football team that represented Loyola University Chicago as an independent during the 1924 college football season. Led by Roger Kiley in his second season as head coach, the Ramblers compiled an overall record of 5–2–2.

== Schedule ==
Date	Opponent	Site	Result	Attendance	Source
September 27	Great Lakes Navy	Loyola Field; Chicago, IL	W 34–0		
October 11	Millikin	Loyola Field; Chicago, IL	W 19–7		
October 18	at Saint Louis	St. Louis University Athletic Field; St. Louis, MO	L 7–13		
October 25	at Dayton	Varsity Field; Dayton, OH	W 7–6		
November 1	Missouri Mines	Loyola Field; Chicago, IL	W 6–0		
November 8	Central (IA)	Loyola Field; Chicago, IL	W 46–0		
November 15	at St. Ambrose	Davenport, IA	T 14–14		
November 22	at Carroll (WI)	Waukesha, WI	L 7–10		
November 27	St. Viator	Loyola Field; Chicago, IL	T 7–7	6,000	
