= 1924 Michigan Agricultural Aggies football team =

American college football season

1924 Michigan Agricultural Aggies football
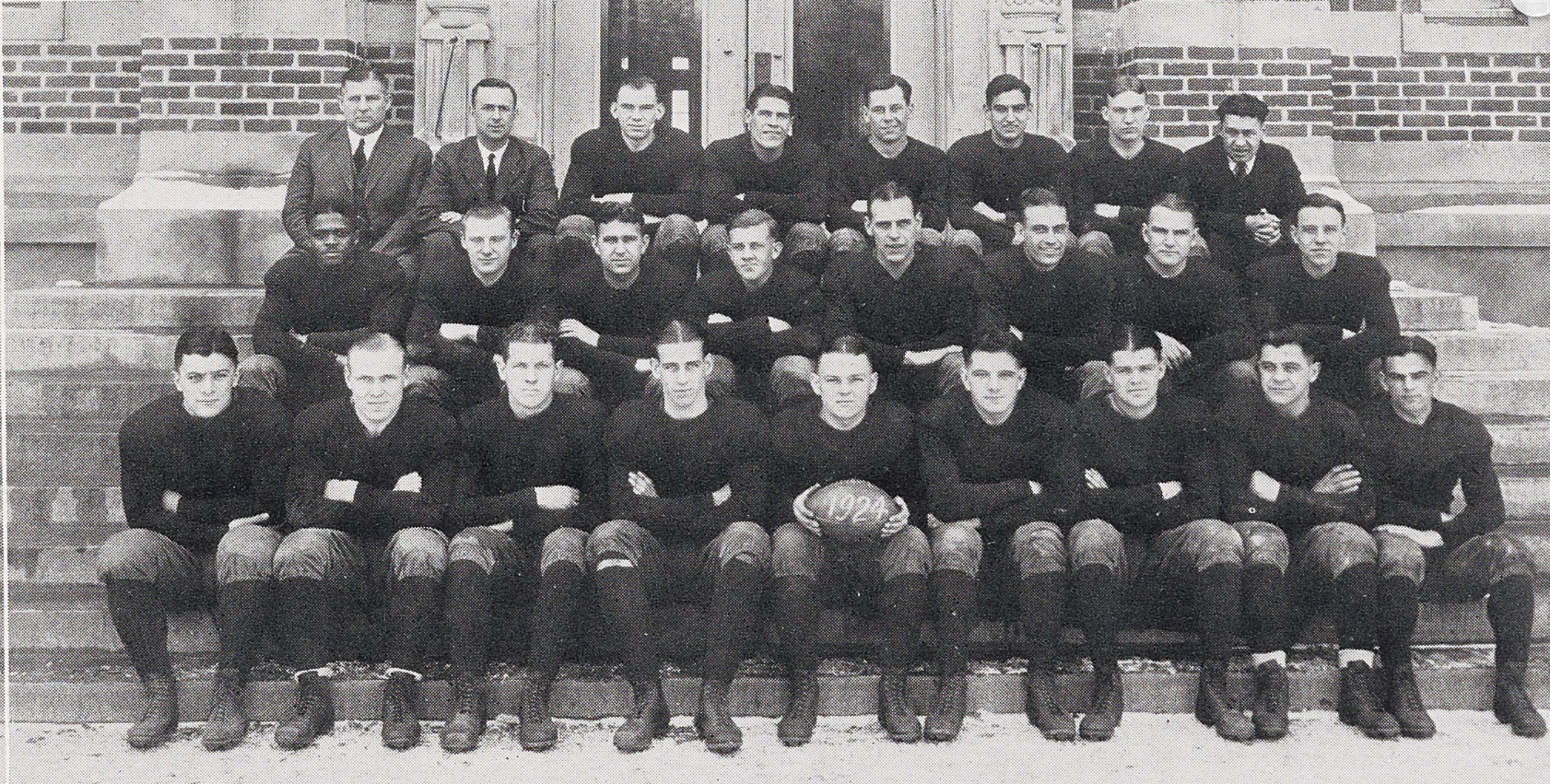
- Conference: Independent
- Record: 5–3
- Head coach: Ralph H. Young (2nd season)
- Captain: Vivian Hultman
- Home stadium: Aggie Stadium

1924 Midwestern college football independents records
	Conf.			Overall
Team	W	L	T	W		L		T
No. 1 Notre Dame		–		10	–	0	–	0
Kirksville Osteopaths		–		6	–	0	–	0
Central Michigan		–		7	–	1	–	0
Western State Normal		–		6	–	1	–	0
John Carroll		–		7	–	2	–	0
Haskell		–		7	–	2	–	1
Indiana State		–		6	–	2	–	0
Loyola (IL)		–		5	–	2	–	2
Marquette		–		5	–	2	–	0
Dayton		–		7	–	3	–	0
Saint Louis		–		6	–	3	–	0
Michigan Agricultural		–		5	–	3	–	0
Wabash		–		5	–	4	–	0
Butler		–		4	–	5	–	0
Detroit		–		4	–	5	–	0
Muncie Normal		–		1	–	3	–	0
Michigan Mines		–		0	–	2	–	1
Kent State		–		0	–	4	–	0
Rankings from Dickinson System

The 1924 Michigan Agricultural Aggies football team was an American football team that represented Michigan Agricultural College (MAC), now known as Michigan State University, as an independent during the 1924 college football season. In their second year under head coach Ralph H. Young, the Aggies compiled a 5–3 record and outscored opponents by a total of 210 to 48. It was MAC's first season with a winning record since 1918.

The team played its home games at the newly-completed Aggie Stadium in East Lansing, Michigan. The stadium was formally dedicated on October 11, 1924, the day of the Aggies annual game with th Michigan Wolverines.

== Schedule ==
Date	Opponent	Site	Result	Attendance	Source
September 26	North-Western College	Aggie Stadium; East Lansing, MI	W 59–0		
October 4	Olivet	Aggie Stadium; East Lansing, MI	W 54–3		
October 11	Michigan^{†}	Aggie Stadium; East Lansing, MI (rivalry)	L 0–7	22,000	
October 17	Chicago YMCA	Aggie Stadium; East Lansing, MI	W 34–3		
October 25	at Northwestern	Northwestern Field; Evanston, IL	L 9–13		
November 1	Lake Forest	Aggie Stadium; East Lansing, MI	W 42–13		
November 8	at Saint Louis	St. Louis University Athletic Field; St. Louis, MO	L 3–9		
November 15	South Dakota State	Aggie Stadium; East Lansing, MI	W 9–0		
^{†}Homecoming

== Game summaries ==
=== Michigan ===
Michigan at Michigan Agricultural

Team	1	2	3	4	Total
• Michigan	0	0	0	7	7
Michigan Agricultural	0	0	0	0	0

- Date: October 11, 1924
- Location: Aggie Stadium • East Lansing, MI

On October 11, 1924, the Aggies hosted Michigan in East Lansing. The game remained scoreless through the first three quarters. Michigan scored on a pass from halfback Frederick Parker to end Herb Steger to win the game by a 7 to 0 score. The 1925 Michiganensian described the play as follows: "In the last few minutes of play, Parker threw one of the long sensational passes that characterized the Wolverine's attack throughout the entire season, to Captain Steger who caught it and ran for a touchdown." According to The New York Times, Michigan center Robert J. Brown "was credited with an outstanding performance in the line."
