= 1924 Western State Normal Hilltoppers football team =

American college football season

1924 Western State Normal Hilltoppers football
- Conference: Independent
- Record: 6–1
- Head coach: Earl Martineau (1st season)
- Captain: Oscar Johnson
- Home stadium: Normal field

1924 Midwestern college football independents records
	Conf.			Overall
Team	W	L	T	W		L		T
No. 1 Notre Dame		–		10	–	0	–	0
Kirksville Osteopaths		–		6	–	0	–	0
Central Michigan		–		7	–	1	–	0
Western State Normal		–		6	–	1	–	0
John Carroll		–		7	–	2	–	0
Haskell		–		7	–	2	–	1
Indiana State		–		6	–	2	–	0
Loyola (IL)		–		5	–	2	–	2
Marquette		–		5	–	2	–	0
Dayton		–		7	–	3	–	0
Saint Louis		–		6	–	3	–	0
Michigan Agricultural		–		5	–	3	–	0
Wabash		–		5	–	4	–	0
Butler		–		4	–	5	–	0
Detroit		–		4	–	5	–	0
Muncie Normal		–		1	–	3	–	0
Michigan Mines		–		0	–	2	–	1
Kent State		–		0	–	4	–	0
Rankings from Dickinson System

The 1924 Western State Normal Hilltoppers football team represented Western State Normal School (later renamed Western Michigan University) as an independent during the 1924 college football season. In their first season under head coach Earl Martineau, the Hilltoppers compiled a 6–1 record. Tackle Oscar Johnson was the team captain.

Martineau was hired as the Hilltoppers' head coach in June 1924. He had played college football for Minnesota the prior year and been selected by Walter Camp to the 1923 College Football All-America Team. Minnesota coach William H. Spaulding, who had previously coached the Hilltoppers, recommended Martineau for the job.

== Schedule ==
Date	Time	Opponent	Site	Result	Source
October 4	2:30 p.m.	Alma	Normal field; Kalamazoo, MI	W 7–0	
October 10	2:30 p.m.	St. Viator	Normal field; Kalamazoo, MI	W 6–0	
October 25	2:30 p.m.	at Western Kentucky State Normal	Fair Grounds; Bowling Green, KY	W 14–0	
November 1	2:30 p.m.	Oshkosh Normal	Normal field; Kalamazoo, MI	W 23–7	
November 7	2:30 p.m.	Notre Dame freshmen	Normal field; Kalamazoo, MI	L 7–15	
November 14	2:00 p.m.	Chicago YMCA College	Normal field; Kalamazoo, MI	W 18–3	
November 27	2:00 p.m.	Albion	Normal field; Kalamazoo, MI	W 26–6	
All times are in Central time
