= 1924 Central Michigan Normalites football team =

American college football season

1924 Central Michigan Normalites football
- Conference: Independent
- Record: 7–1
- Head coach: Lester Barnard (1st season)

1924 Midwestern college football independents records
	Conf.			Overall
Team	W	L	T	W		L		T
No. 1 Notre Dame		–		10	–	0	–	0
Kirksville Osteopaths		–		6	–	0	–	0
Central Michigan		–		7	–	1	–	0
Western State Normal		–		6	–	1	–	0
John Carroll		–		7	–	2	–	0
Haskell		–		7	–	2	–	1
Indiana State		–		6	–	2	–	0
Loyola (IL)		–		5	–	2	–	2
Marquette		–		5	–	2	–	0
Dayton		–		7	–	3	–	0
Saint Louis		–		6	–	3	–	0
Michigan Agricultural		–		5	–	3	–	0
Wabash		–		5	–	4	–	0
Butler		–		4	–	5	–	0
Detroit		–		4	–	5	–	0
Muncie Normal		–		1	–	3	–	0
Michigan Mines		–		0	–	2	–	1
Kent State		–		0	–	4	–	0
Rankings from Dickinson System

The 1924 Central Michigan Normalites football team represented Central Michigan Normal School, later renamed Central Michigan University, as an independent during the 1924 college football season. In their first season under head coach Lester Barnard, the Central Michigan football team compiled a 7–1 record, shut out six of eight opponents, and outscored all opponents by a combined total of 158 to 19. The team's sole loss was to Albion by a 13–12 score.

== Schedule ==
Date	Opponent	Site	Result	Source
October 11	at Assumption (ON)	Windsor, ON	W 26–0	
October 18	at Albion	Albion, MI	L 12–13	
October 25	at Michigan State Normal	Ypsilanti, MI (rivalry)	W 13–0	
November 1	Bowling Green	Mount Pleasant, MI	W 21–0	
November 8	Northern State Normal	Mount Pleasant, MI	W 22–0	
November 15	at Valparaiso	Gleason Field; Gary, IN	W 13–0	
November 22	Alma^{†}	Mount Pleasant, MI	W 13–0	
November 27	at Detroit City College	Codd Field; Detroit, MI	W 38–6	
^{†}Homecoming
