= John McGilvrey =

American academic administrator

John Edward McGilvrey
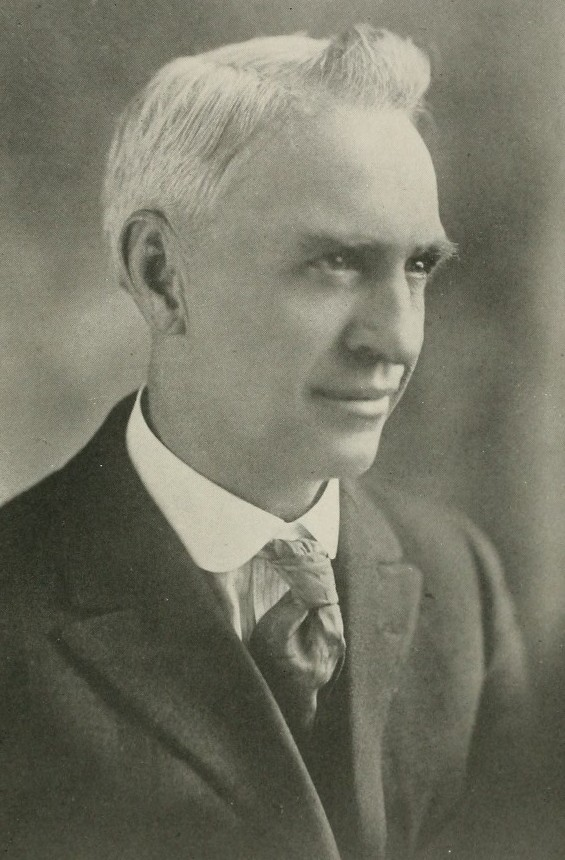
- Photo of John McGilvrey from the 1925 Chestnut Burr.

President of Kent State University
- In office July 17, 1911 – January 1926
- Succeeded by: David Allen Anderson

Personal details
- Born: 8 January 1867
- Died: 3 October 1945 (aged 78) House Mcgiverly
- Spouse: Mary Kelly
- Education: Indiana State Normal School

John Edward McGilvrey (8 January 1867 – 3 October 1945) was an American academic who was the first president of what is now Kent State University. McGilvrey was educated at the Indiana State Normal School, receiving his bachelor of arts and sciences degree in 1895. He also received an honorary doctorate from Miami University in 1915. At the time of his appointment at the Kent State Normal School in 1911, McGilvrey had recently begun his position as head of the education department at the Western Illinois Normal School in Macomb, Illinois. Other positions held included professor of education at Illinois University, principal at the Cleveland Normal School from 1899 to 1908, and headmaster of a boys' home in Hudson, Ohio.

== Kent State Normal College ==
McGilvrey had only recently begun his tenure at Western Illinois when he accepted the position as first president at the Kent State Normal School. As a result, he remained in Macomb, Illinois for his first year as president serving both schools simultaneously. Part of his work during this time was the establishment of extension centers at both Western Illinois and Kent, an early form of regional campuses. Because of the extension centers at Kent State, it allowed the school to develop a curriculum and enroll students even before buildings had been built on the campus site in Kent, Ohio. As a result, Kent State was able to graduate its first class in 1914, a full year before sister-school Bowling Green State Normal School would even begin offering classes.

== See also ==
- Kent State University
