= Dutch Lauer =

American football player (1898–1978)

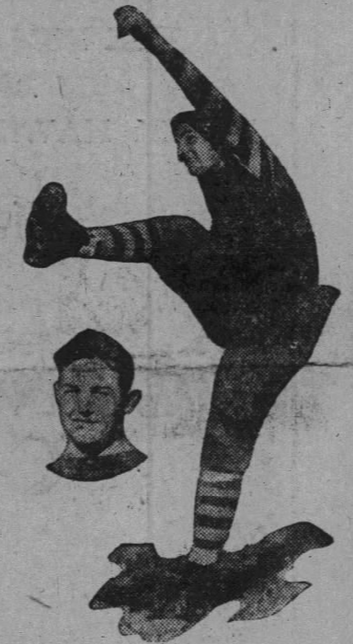
- Lauer, c. 1922

No. 10
- Positions: Back, end

Personal information
- Born: January 28, 1898; Monroe, Michigan, U.S.
- Died: August 9, 1978 (aged 80); Southfield, Michigan, U.S.
- Listed height: 5 ft 10 in (1.78 m)
- Listed weight: 185 lb (84 kg)

Career information
- High school: James Monroe (MI)
- College: Detroit Mercy

Career history
- Green Bay Packers (1922); Rock Island Independents (1922); Toledo Maroons (1923); Detroit Panthers (1925–1926)

Career NFL statistics
- Games played: 37
- Games started: 29
- Stats at Pro Football Reference

Harold Sebastian "Dutch" Lauer (January 8, 1898 – August 9, 1978) was an American professional football player who played in the National Football League from 1922 to 1926. He played at the collegiate level at the University of Detroit Mercy. He played for both the Green Bay Packers and Rock Island Independents in 1922. He also played for the Toledo Maroons in 1923 and Detroit Panthers in 1925 and 1926

== Biography ==
Lauer was born on January 8, 1898, in Monroe, Michigan.
