= Merle E. Wagoner =

Biographical details
- Born: April 15, 1894; Beaver Falls, Pennsylvania, U.S.
- Died: August 18, 1971 (aged 77); Phoenix, Arizona, U.S.

Coaching career (HC unless noted)

Football
- 1925–1932: Kent State

Basketball
- 1925–1933: Kent State

Baseball
- 1926–1933: Kent State

Administrative career (AD unless noted)
- 1923–1933: Kent State

Head coaching record
- Overall: 15–33–9 (football); 43–81 (basketball); 27–34 (baseball)

Merle Edwin Wagoner (April 15, 1894 – August 18, 1971) was an American football, basketball, baseball, track, and tennis coach and college athletics administrator. He served as the head football coach at Kent State College—now known as Kent State University— from 1925 to 1932, compiling a record of 15–33–9. Wagoner was the head basketball coach at Kent State from 1925 to 1933, tallying a mark of 43–81, and the school's head baseball coach from 1926 to 1933, amassing a record of 27–34. He was the Kent State's athletic director from 1925 to 1933 and also coached track and tennis there.

Wagoner was born in Beaver Falls, Pennsylvania and attended Mercersburg Academy in Mercersburg, Pennsylvania. He died of an apparent heart attack on August 18, 1971, at St. Joseph Hospital in Phoenix, Arizona.

== Head coaching record ==
=== Football ===
Year	Team	Overall	Conference	Standing	Bowl/playoffs
Kent State Silver Foxes / Golden Flashes (Independent) (1925–1931)
1925	Kent State	1–1–3			
1926	Kent State	2–6			
1927	Kent State	1–5–1			
1928	Kent State	4–2–2			
1929	Kent State	1–7			
1930	Kent State	3–3–1			
1931	Kent State	3–4			
Kent State Golden Flashes (Ohio Athletic Conference) (1932)
1932	Kent State	0–5–2	0–5–2	T–17th	
Kent State:		15–33–9	0–5–2		
Total:		15–33–9			
