= Frank Harsh =

American football and basketball coach

Biographical details
- Born: March 10, 1894; Cleveland, Ohio, U.S.
- Died: May 1, 1956 (aged 62)
- Education: Ohio State (1917)

Coaching career (HC unless noted)

Football
- 1923–1924: Kent State

Basketball
- 1923–1925: Kent State

Head coaching record
- Overall: 0–9 (football); 8–17 (basketball)

Frank Norton Harsh Sr. (March 10, 1894 – May 18, 1956) was an American football and basketball coach. He served as the head football coach at Kent State Normal College—now known as Kent State University—from 1923 to 1924, compiling a record of 0–9. Harsh was also the school's head basketball coach from 1923 to 1925, tallying a record of 8–17. He graduated from Ohio State University in 1917

== Head coaching record ==
Year	Team	Overall	Conference	Standing	Bowl/playoffs
Kent State Silver Foxes (Independent) (1923–1924)
1923	Kent State	0–5			
1924	Kent State	0–4			
Kent State:		0–9			
Total:		0–9			
