= Paul G. Chandler (educator) =

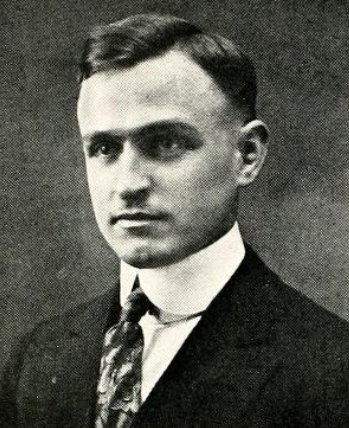

Biographical details
- Born: November 7, 1889; Princeton, Kentucky, U.S.
- Died: August 8, 1986 (aged 96); Mississippi, U.S.
- Education: Kentucky Wesleyan (1914)

Playing career

Football
- 1910–1913: Kentucky Wesleyan

Coaching career (HC unless noted)

Football
- 1920–1922: Kent State

Basketball
- 1920–1923: Kent State

Baseball
- 1922: Kent State

Head coaching record
- Overall: 1–11–1 (football); 12–23 (basketball)

Paul Gladstone Chandler (November 7, 1889 – August 8, 1986) was an American football, basketball and baseball coach, educator, and college president. He served as the head football coach (1920–1922), head men's basketball coach (1920–1923) and head baseball coach (1922) at Kent State Normal College—now known as Kent State University—in Kent, Ohio.

Chandler earned Master of Arts and Doctor of Philosophy degrees from Columbia University. He was the head of the education department of Kent State for seven years and taught at Millersville State Teachers College—now known as Millersville University of Pennsylvania for ten years. He was as the president of Clarion State College, now known as PennWest Clarion, from 1937 to 1960.

== Head coaching record ==
=== Football ===
Year	Team	Overall	Conference	Standing	Bowl/playoffs
Kent State Silver Foxes (Independent) (1920–1922)
1920	Kent State	1–2			
1921	Kent State	0–2–1			
1922	Kent State	0–7			
Kent State:		1–11–1			
Total:		1–11–1			
