= Schwank =

Schwank is a surname. Notable people with the surname include:

- Eduardo Schwank (born 1986), Argentine tennis player
- Judy Schwank (born 1951), American politician
- Wally Schwank (c. 1912 – 2009), American football coach and athletics administrator
- Zak Schwank (born 1978), American politician and Mayor of Temecula, California since 2022
