= Paul Bender =

Paul Bender may refer to:

- Paul Bender (bass) (1875–1947), German opera singer
- Paul Bender (jurist) (1933–2026), American expert on constitutional law
- Paul F. Bender (1896–1992), American football and collegiate wrestling coach
- Paul Bender (fl. 2011–), bassist of the Australian band Hiatus Kaiyote
