= 1928 Iowa State Teachers football team =

American college football season

1928 Iowa State Teachers football

Iowa Conference champion
- Conference: Iowa Conference
- Record: 5–1–3 (4–0–2 Iowa)
- Head coach: Paul F. Bender (4th season)

1928 Iowa Conference football standings
	Conf.					Overall
Team	W		L		T	W		L		T
Iowa State Teachers $	4	–	0	–	2	5	–	1	–	3
Morningside	2	–	0	–	0	5	–	4	–	0
Luther	5	–	2	–	0	6	–	2	–	0
Penn (IA)	4	–	2	–	0	4	–	4	–	0
Des Moines	3	–	2	–	0	4	–	4	–	1
Iowa Wesleyan	3	–	2	–	0	5	–	3	–	0
Buena Vista	3	–	2	–	0	5	–	3	–	1
Simpson (IA)	3	–	2	–	1	4	–	4	–	1
St. Ambrose	2	–	2	–	1	2	–	4	–	2
Parsons	2	–	2	–	2	3	–	3	–	3
Western Union	1	–	2	–	0	4	–	5	–	0
Upper Iowa	1	–	3	–	1	1	–	3	–	1
Columbia (IA)	0	–	4	–	1	2	–	5	–	1
Central (IA)	0	–	8	–	0	0	–	8	–	0
$ – Conference champion

The 1928 Iowa State Teachers football team was an American football team that represented Iowa State Teachers College (now known as the University of Northern Iowa) as a member of the Iowa Conference during the 1928 college football season. In its fourth season under head coach Paul F. Bender, the team compiled a 5–1–3 record (4–0–2 against conference opponents), shut out six of nine opponents, outscored all opponents by a total of 150 to 52, and won the Iowa Conference championship. The team's three ties remains a school record.

== Schedule ==
Date	Opponent	Site	Result	Attendance	Source
October 6	Coe	Cedar Falls, IA	L 0–32		
October 13	at Iowa Wesleyan	Mount Pleasant, IA	W 34–0		
October 20	William Penn	Cedar Falls, IA	W 40–0		
October 27	Northern Illinois	Cedar Falls, IA	W 39–0		
November 2	Upper Iowa	Fayette, IA	T 13–13		
November 10	Grinnell	Cedar Falls, IA	T 0–0		
November 17	at Parsons	Fairfield, IA	T 0–0		
November 24	at Luther	Decorah, IA	W 12–0		
November 29	at Des Moines	Des Moines, IA	W 12–7		
