= 1925 Iowa State Teachers football team =

American college football season

1925 Iowa State Teachers football
- Conference: Iowa Conference
- Record: 5–1–2 (4–1–1 Iowa)
- Head coach: Paul F. Bender (1st season)

1925 Iowa Conference football standings
	Conf.					Overall
Team	W		L		T	W		L		T
Buena Vista	1	–	0	–	0	8	–	1	–	0
Upper Iowa +	5	–	1	–	0	5	–	1	–	1
Simpson (IA) +	5	–	1	–	0	6	–	2	–	1
Iowa State Teachers	4	–	1	–	1	5	–	1	–	2
Parsons	2	–	1	–	1	4	–	2	–	1
Penn (IA)	2	–	1	–	2	4	–	2	–	2
St. Ambrose	3	–	2	–	0	5	–	3	–	1
Western Union	2	–	2	–	0	3	–	4	–	0
Morningside	1	–	1	–	0	3	–	5	–	0
Central (IA)	1	–	2	–	1	2	–	3	–	1
Iowa Wesleyan	1	–	4	–	0	3	–	5	–	0
Luther	0	–	2	–	0	3	–	4	–	0
Des Moines	0	–	4	–	1	0	–	7	–	1
Ellsworth	0	–	5	–	0	0	–	7	–	0
+ – Conference co-champions

The 1925 Iowa State Teachers football team was an American football team that represented Iowa State Teachers College (later renamed the University of Northern Iowa) as a member of the Iowa Conference during the 1925 college football season. In its first season under head coach Paul F. Bender, the team compiled a 5–1–2 record (4–1–1 in conference games) and outscored opponents by a total of 101 to 45.

== Schedule ==
Date	Opponent	Site	Result	Source
October 3	at Ellsworth	Iowa Falls, IA	W 33–0	
October 9	at Iowa Wesleyan	Mount Pleasant, IA	W 21–3	
October 16	at Simpson (IA)	Indianola, IA	L 0–23	
October 24	Luther^{†}	Cedar Falls, IA	W 20–9	
October 30	at Penn (IA)	Oskaloosa, IA	T 0–0	
November 13	Upper Iowa	Cedar Falls, IA	W 14–7	
November 20	Kirksville Osteopaths*	Cedar Falls, IA	W 13–0	
November 28	Colorado Teachers*	Cedar Falls, IA	T 3–3	
*Non-conference game; ^{†}Homecoming
