= Liberty Mutual Coach of the Year Award =

Defunct college football coach award

- Liberty Mutual Coach of the Year logo
- Awarded for: best college football coach in each NCAA Division
- Country: United States
- Presented by: Liberty Mutual Coach of the Year Selection Committee, fan votes, media votes

History
- First award: 2006
- Final award: 2013
- Most recent: Gus Malzahn (FBS); Craig Bohl (FCS); Peter Rossomando (Division II); Glenn Caruso (Division III)

The Liberty Mutual Coach of the Year Award was an annual college football award given to the a head coach from each NCAA division. The award honored coaches who succeed on and off the field, displaying sportsmanship, integrity, responsibility, and excellence. Each coach who won was given $50,000 to donate to the charities of his choice, and a $20,000 grant for alumni association scholarships from the school the coach represents.

== Winners ==
=== Division I FBS ===
Year	Coach	School	Ref
2006	Greg Schiano	Rutgers	
2007	Ron Zook	Illinois	
2008	Nick Saban	Alabama	
2009	Gary Patterson	TCU	
2010	Gene Chizik	Auburn	
2011	Les Miles	LSU	
2012	Brian Kelly	Notre Dame	
2013	Gus Malzahn	Auburn	

- Note: In 2006, the award was only given to a Division I FBS coach.

=== Division I FCS ===
Year	Coach	School
2007	Jerry Kill	Southern Illinois
2008	Mickey Matthews	James Madison
2009	Jerry Moore	Appalachian State
2010	K. C. Keeler	Delaware
2011	Rob Ash	Montana State
2012	Willie Fritz	Sam Houston State
2013	Craig Bohl	North Dakota State

=== Division II ===
Year	Coach	School
2007	Bill O'Boyle	Chadron State
2008	Chuck Broyles	Pittsburg State
2009	Mel Tjeerdsma	Northwest Missouri State
2010	Bob Nielson	Minnesota–Duluth
2011	Tim Beck	Pittsburg State
2012	Peter Rossomando	New Haven
2013	Curt Wiese	Minnesota–Duluth

=== Division III ===
Year	Coach	School
2007	John Gagliardi	Saint John's (MN)
2008	Larry Kehres	Mount Union
2009	Steve Staker	Coe
2010	Glenn Caruso	St. Thomas (MN)
2011	Glenn Caruso (2)	St. Thomas (MN)
2012	Glenn Caruso (3)	St. Thomas (MN)
2013	Pete Fredenburg	Mary Hardin–Baylor
