= 1927 Northern Illinois State Teachers football team =

American college football season

1927 Northern Illinois State Teachers football
- Conference: Independent
- Record: 1–4–1
- Head coach: Roland Cowell (2nd season)
- Captains: Howard Larson; Ivan Nicholas
- Home stadium: Glidden Field

1927 Midwestern college football independents records
| | Conf. | | | Overall |
| Team | W | L | T | W | | L | | T |
|---|---|---|---|---|---|---|---|---|
| No. 4 Notre Dame | | – | | 7 | – | 2 | – | 1 |
| Detroit | | – | | 7 | – | 2 | – | 0 |
| Ball Teachers | | – | | 5 | – | 2 | – | 1 |
| Marquette | | – | | 6 | – | 3 | – | 0 |
| Michigan Tech | | – | | 2 | – | 1 | – | 0 |
| Haskell | | – | | 5 | – | 3 | – | 1 |
| Butler | | – | | 4 | – | 3 | – | 1 |
| John Carroll | | – | | 3 | – | 2 | – | 3 |
| Saint Louis | | – | | 5 | – | 5 | – | 0 |
| Lombard | | – | | 4 | – | 4 | – | 0 |
| Loyola (IL) | | – | | 4 | – | 4 | – | 0 |
| Michigan State | | – | | 4 | – | 5 | – | 0 |
| Northern Illinois State | | – | | 1 | – | 4 | – | 1 |
| Kent State | | – | | 1 | – | 5 | – | 1 |
| Valparaiso | | – | | 1 | – | 5 | – | 0 |
Rankings from Dickinson System

The 1927 Northern Illinois State Teachers football team represented Northern Illinois State Teachers College—now known as Northern Illinois University—as an independent during the 1927 college football season. Led by second-year head coach Roland Cowell, the Teachers compiled a record of 1–4–1 record. Northern Illinois State played home games at Glidden Field, located on the east end of campus in DeKalb, Illinois. Howard Larson and Ivan Nicholas were the team's co-captains.

== Schedule ==
| Date | Opponent | Site | Result | Source |
|---|---|---|---|---|
| October 8 | at Michigan State Normal | Normal Field; Ypsilanti, MI | L 6–26 | |
| October 15 | at Valparaiso | Valparaiso, IN | W 12–2 | |
| October 21 | Chicago YMCA | Glidden Field; DeKalb, IL | L 13–18 | |
| November 5 | Iowa State Teachers | Glidden Field; DeKalb, IL | L 6–20 | |
| November 11 | Milwaukee Normal | Glidden Field; DeKalb, IL | T 0–0 | |
| November 19 | at Indiana State | Terre Haute, IN | L 12–27 | |
