= 1927 Detroit Titans football team =

American college football season

1927 Detroit Titans football
- Conference: Independent
- Record: 7–2
- Head coach: Gus Dorais (3rd season)
- Home stadium: University of Detroit Stadium

1927 Midwestern college football independents records
	Conf.			Overall
Team	W	L	T	W		L		T
No. 4 Notre Dame		–		7	–	2	–	1
Detroit		–		7	–	2	–	0
Ball Teachers		–		5	–	2	–	1
Marquette		–		6	–	3	–	0
Michigan Tech		–		2	–	1	–	0
Haskell		–		5	–	3	–	1
Butler		–		4	–	3	–	1
John Carroll		–		3	–	2	–	3
Saint Louis		–		5	–	5	–	0
Lombard		–		4	–	4	–	0
Loyola (IL)		–		4	–	4	–	0
Michigan State		–		4	–	5	–	0
Northern Illinois State		–		1	–	4	–	1
Kent State		–		1	–	5	–	1
Valparaiso		–		1	–	5	–	0
Rankings from Dickinson System

The 1927 Detroit Titans football team represented the University of Detroit as an independent during the 1927 college football season. Detroit outscored opponents by a combined total of 235 to 47 and finished with a 7–2 record in their third year under head coach Gus Dorais. The team's losses came in games against Knute Rockne's 1927 Notre Dame team that has been rated as a national champion and against Army which was the only team to beat Notre Dame in 1927.

The team was led by halfback Lloyd Brazil of whom coach Dorais later said: "As far as I'm concerned, there were only three great collegiate backs in my lifetime -- Jim Thorpe, George Gipp and Lloyd Brazil."

== Schedule ==
Date	Opponent	Site	Result	Attendance	Source
September 24	Adrian	University of Detroit Stadium; Detroit, MI	W 44–0		
October 1	at Army	Michie Stadium; West Point, NY	L 0–6		
October 8	Notre Dame	University of Detroit Stadium; Detroit, MI	L 0–20	28,000	
October 15	Columbia (IA)	University of Detroit Stadium; Detroit, MI	W 58–0		
October 29	at Michigan State	Spartan Stadium; East Lansing, MI	W 24–7		
November 5	Haskell	University of Detroit Stadium; Detroit, MI	W 38–7		
November 11	at Saint Louis	Sportsman's Park; St. Louis, MO	W 21–0		
November 19	at Carnegie Tech	Forbes Field; Pittsburgh, PA	W 12–7		
November 24	South Dakota State	University of Detroit Stadium; Detroit, MI	W 38–0		
