= Moray Eby =

American football player and coach (1877–1958)

Biographical details
- Born: October 15, 1877; Adair, Iowa, U.S.
- Died: November 25, 1958 (aged 81); Cedar Rapids, Iowa, U.S.

Playing career
- 1897–1900: Iowa
- Position: Tackle

Coaching career (HC unless noted)
- 1901–1913: Iowa (assistant)
- 1914–1942: Coe

Administrative career (AD unless noted)
- 1914–1943: Coe

Head coaching record
- Overall: 131–79–18

Accomplishments and honors

Championships
- 7 MWC (1922, 1928–1930, 1933–1934, 1936)

Moray Leon Eby (October 15, 1877 – November 25, 1958) was an American football player and coach. He served as the head football coach at Coe College from 1914 to 1942. Eby played college football at the University of Iowa from 1897 to 1900. He was the captain of the 1899 Iowa Hawkeyes football team.

Eby was born on October 15, 1877, in Adair, Iowa. He died at his home in Cedar Rapids, Iowa, on November 25, 1958.

== Head coaching record ==
| Year | Team | Overall | Conference | Standing | Bowl/playoffs |
|---|---|---|---|---|---|
Coe Warriors (Independent) (1914–1921)
| 1914 | Coe | 7–1 | | | |
| 1915 | Coe | 7–1 | | | |
| 1916 | Coe | 5–2 | | | |
| 1917 | Coe | 4–3 | | | |
| 1918 | Coe | 4–1–1 | | | |
| 1919 | Coe | 4–3 | | | |
| 1920 | Coe | 5–0–2 | | | |
| 1921 | Coe | 6–1 | | | |
Coe Crimson / Kohawks (Midwest Conference) (1922–1942)
| 1922 | Coe | 7–0 | 2–0 | 1st | |
| 1923 | Coe | 6–2 | 1–1 | T–4th | |
| 1924 | Coe | 3–4–1 | 2–2 | T–4th | |
| 1925 | Coe | 3–5 | 2–2 | 6th | |
| 1926 | Coe | 6–2 | 5–1 | 2nd | |
| 1927 | Coe | 4–3–1 | 3–2 | 3rd | |
| 1928 | Coe | 6–1–1 | 4–0–1 | 1st | |
| 1929 | Coe | 5–3 | 4–0 | 1st | |
| 1930 | Coe | 6–0–2 | 2–0–2 | 1st | |
| 1931 | Coe | 1–8 | 1–3 | T–6th | |
| 1932 | Coe | 2–5–2 | 1–2–1 | T–6th | |
| 1933 | Coe | 7–1 | 4–0 | 1st | |
| 1934 | Coe | 6–1–2 | 3–0–1 | T–1st | |
| 1935 | Coe | 5–1–2 | 2–1–1 | T–3rd | |
| 1936 | Coe | 6–2 | 4–0 | T–1st | |
| 1937 | Coe | 4–3–2 | 2–2–1 | 4th | |
| 1938 | Coe | 4–4 | 3–2 | T–2nd | |
| 1939 | Coe | 2–5–2 | 2–3–1 | T–6th | |
| 1940 | Coe | 3–5 | 3–5 | 7th | |
| 1941 | Coe | 2–6 | 2–5 | T–6th | |
| 1942 | Coe | 1–6 | 1–5 | T–7th | |
| Coe: | | 131–79–18 | 53–36–8 | | |
| Total: | | 131–79–18 | | | |
National championship Conference title Conference division title or championship game berth
