= Dick Clausen =

American football coach and administrator (1912–2000)

Biographical details
- Born: 1912; Vining, Iowa, U.S.
- Died: December 2000 (aged 88); Tucson, Arizona, U.S.

Playing career

Football
- c. 1935: Iowa

Baseball
- c. 1935: Iowa
- Positions: End (football); First baseman (baseball)

Coaching career (HC unless noted)

Football
- 1938: Clear Lake HS (IA)
- 1939–1941: Hampton HS (IA)
- 1942–1947: New Trier HS (IL)
- 1948–1955: Coe
- 1956–1957: New Mexico

Basketball
- 1938–1939: Clear Lake HS (IA)

Administrative career (AD unless noted)
- 1958–1972: Arizona

Head coaching record
- Overall: 43–36–5 (college football)

Accomplishments and honors

Championships
- 3 MWC (1950, 1952, 1955)

Dick Clausen (1912 – December 2000) was an American football coach and college athletics administrator. He served as the head football coach at Coe College from 1948 to 1955 and the University of New Mexico from 1956 to 1957, compiling a career college football record of 43–36–5. Clausen was also the athletic director at the University of Arizona from 1958 to 1972.

Born in Vining, Iowa, Clausen attended high school in Sabula, Iowa, graduating in 1928. At the University of Iowa, he played football as an end and baseball, as a first baseman. Clausen died at in December 2000, at the age of 88, in Tucson, Arizona.

== Head coaching record ==
=== College football ===
Year	Team	Overall	Conference	Standing	Bowl/playoffs
Coe Kohawks (Midwest Conference) (1948–1955)
1948	Coe	1–5–2	1–4–1	7th	
1949	Coe	1–6–1	0–6	9th	
1950	Coe	6–2	5–1	T–1st	
1951	Coe	3–5	2–4	6th	
1952	Coe	7–1	6–0	1st	
1953	Coe	5–2–1	5–0–1	2nd	
1954	Coe	4–3–1	4–3–1	4th	
1955	Coe	8–0	7–0	1st	
Coe:		35–24–5	30–18–3		
New Mexico Lobos (Skyline Conference) (1956–1957)
1956	New Mexico	4–6	2–4	6th	
1957	New Mexico	4–6	2–4	5th	
New Mexico:		8–12	4–8		
Total:		43–36–5			
National championship Conference title Conference division title or championship game berth
