= Steve Staker =

American football coach (1943–2020)

Biographical details
- Born: May 28, 1943; Waterloo, Iowa, U.S.
- Died: April 28, 2020 (aged 76); Lisbon, Iowa, U.S.
- Education: Upper Iowa University

Playing career
- c. 1966: Upper Iowa
- Position: Fullback

Coaching career (HC unless noted)
- 1973–2007: Fredericksburg HS (IA)
- 2008–2015: Coe

Head coaching record
- Overall: 55–29 (college)
- Tournaments: 1–3 (NCAA D-III playoffs)

Accomplishments and honors

Championships
- 1 IIAC (2012)

Awards
- Liberty Mutual NCAA Division III COY (2009)

Steven K. Staker (May 28, 1943 – April 28, 2020), also known as Papa Stake, was an American football coach. He was the head football coach at Coe College in Cedar Rapids, Iowa from 2008 to 2015. He was awarded the Liberty Mutual Coach of the Year Award for NCAA Division III in 2009.

Staker attended Upper Iowa University. He was married to Linda King until his death in 2020. They had four children, including Tyler.

Staker died on April 28, 2020 of gallbladder cancer in Lisbon, Iowa, at the age of 76.

== Head coaching record ==
=== College ===
Year	Team	Overall	Conference	Standing	Bowl/playoffs	D3^{#}
Coe Kohawks (Iowa Intercollegiate Athletic Conference) (2008–2015)
2008	Coe	4–6	4–4	T–5th		
2009	Coe	10–2	7–1	2nd	L NCAA Division III Second Round	10
2010	Coe	9–2	7–1	2nd	L NCAA Division III First Round	14
2011	Coe	6–4	6–2	T–2nd		
2012	Coe	10–1	7–0	1st	L NCAA Division III First Round	15
2013	Coe	7–3	4–3	T–3rd		
2014	Coe	5–5	4–3	T–3rd		
2015	Coe	4–6	3–4	T–4th		
Coe:		55–29	42–18			
Total:		55–29				
National championship Conference title Conference division title or championship game berth
