= Paul F. Bender =

American football and wrestling coach

Biographical details
- Born: February 12, 1896; Primrose, Iowa, U.S.
- Died: December 4, 1992 (aged 96); Tucson, Arizona, U.S.
- Education: Iowa

Coaching career (HC unless noted)

Football
- 1919–1920: Shenandoah HS (IA)
- 1925–1929: Iowa State Teachers

Wrestling
- 1922–1930: Iowa State Teachers

Administrative career (AD unless noted)
- 1919–1920: Shenandoah HS (IA)
- 1948–1964: Iowa State Teachers / State College of Iowa (dean of students)

Head coaching record
- Overall: 25–9–6 (college football)

Accomplishments and honors

Championships
- Football; 2 Iowa Conference (1927–1928)

Paul Frank Bender (February 12, 1896 – December 4, 1992) was an American football and wrestling coach. He served as the head football coach at Iowa State Teachers College—now known as the University of Northern Iowa—from 1925 to 1929, compiling a record of 25–9–6. Bender was as the head wrestling coach at Iowa State Teachers from 1922 to 1930.

== Head coaching record ==
=== College football ===
Year	Team	Overall	Conference	Standing	Bowl/playoffs
Iowa State Teachers (Iowa Conference) (1925–1929)
1925	Iowa State Teachers	5–1–2	4–1–1	4th	
1926	Iowa State Teachers	5–3	4–2	T–4th	
1927	Iowa State Teachers	7–0–1	6–0	1st	
1928	Iowa State Teachers	5–1–3	4–0–2	1st	
1929	Iowa State Teachers	3–4	3–1	T–4th	
Iowa State Teachers:		25–9–6	21–4–3		
Total:		25–9–6			
National championship Conference title Conference division title or championship game berth
