= 1927 Iowa State Teachers football team =

American college football season

1927 Iowa State Teachers football

Iowa Conference champion
- Conference: Iowa Conference
- Record: 7–0–1 (6–0 Iowa)
- Head coach: Paul F. Bender (3rd season)

1927 Iowa Conference football standings
	Conf.					Overall
Team	W		L		T	W		L		T
Iowa State Teachers $	6	–	0	–	0	7	–	0	–	1
Columbia (IA)	1	–	0	–	0	2	–	3	–	3
Simpson (IA)	4	–	1	–	0	5	–	3	–	0
Upper Iowa	3	–	1	–	1	4	–	1	–	1
Des Moines	3	–	1	–	1	4	–	6	–	1
Western Union	2	–	1	–	0	5	–	2	–	0
Parsons	3	–	2	–	1	4	–	3	–	1
Penn (IA)	3	–	3	–	0	3	–	4	–	1
Morningside	1	–	1	–	0	3	–	5	–	0
Iowa Wesleyan	2	–	3	–	0	4	–	4	–	0
St. Ambrose	1	–	3	–	0	1	–	6	–	0
Central (IA)	1	–	6	–	0	1	–	7	–	0
Buena Vista	0	–	4	–	1	3	–	5	–	1
Luther	0	–	4	–	0	0	–	8	–	0
$ – Conference champion

The 1927 Iowa State Teachers football team was an American football team that represented Iowa State Teachers College (now known as the University of Northern Iowa) as a member of the Iowa Conference during the 1927 college football season. In its third season under head coach Paul F. Bender, the team compiled a 7–0–1 record (6–0 against conference opponents), outscored opponents by a total of 140 to 32, and won the Iowa Conference championship.

== Schedule ==
Date	Opponent	Site	Result	Source
September 24	at St. Thomas (MN)*	St. Paul, MN	T 6–6	
October 8	Iowa Wesleyan	Cedar Falls, IA	W 9–0	
October 15	at Buena Vista	Storm Lake, IA	W 6–0	
October 22	at Penn (IA)	Oskaloosa, IA	W 12–7	
October 28	Luther	Cedar Falls, IA	W 41–7	
November 5	at Northern Illinois State*	DeKalb, IL	W 20–6	
November 11	Upper Iowa	Cedar Falls, IA	W 14–6	
November 19	Parsons	Cedar Falls, IA	W 32–0	
*Non-conference game
