= 1927 Ball Teachers Hoosieroons football team =

American college football season

1927 Ball Teachers Hoosieroons football
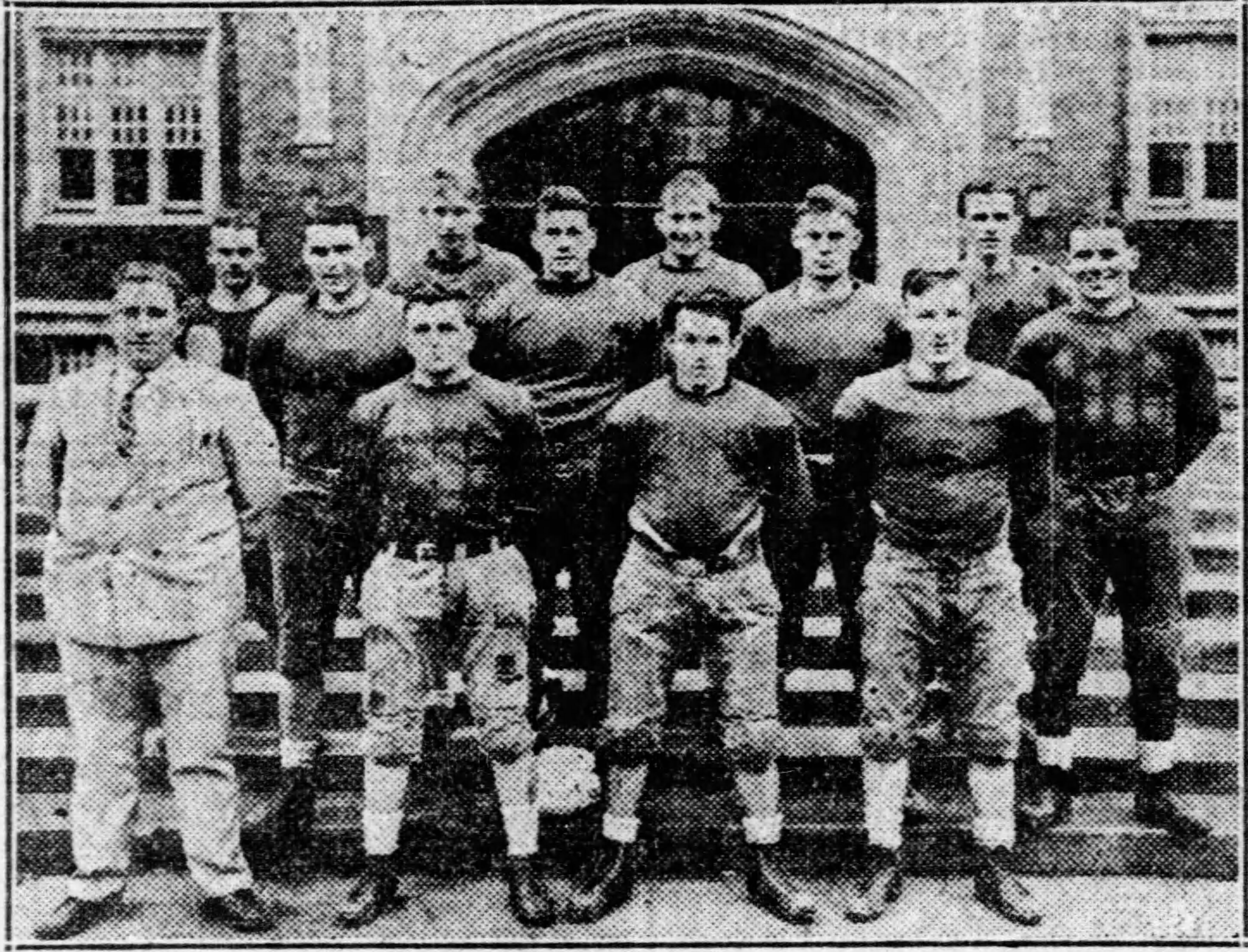
- Conference: Independent
- Record: 5–2–1
- Head coach: Norman G. Wann (2nd season)
- Home stadium: North Walnut Street Ball Park

1927 Midwestern college football independents records
	Conf.			Overall
Team	W	L	T	W		L		T
No. 4 Notre Dame		–		7	–	2	–	1
Detroit		–		7	–	2	–	0
Ball Teachers		–		5	–	2	–	1
Marquette		–		6	–	3	–	0
Michigan Tech		–		2	–	1	–	0
Haskell		–		5	–	3	–	1
Butler		–		4	–	3	–	1
John Carroll		–		3	–	2	–	3
Saint Louis		–		5	–	5	–	0
Lombard		–		4	–	4	–	0
Loyola (IL)		–		4	–	4	–	0
Michigan State		–		4	–	5	–	0
Northern Illinois State		–		1	–	4	–	1
Kent State		–		1	–	5	–	1
Valparaiso		–		1	–	5	–	0
Rankings from Dickinson System

The 1927 Ball Teachers Hoosieroons football team was an American football team that represented Ball Teachers College, sometimes referred to as Muncie Normal School (later renamed Ball State University), during the 1927 college football season. In its second and final season under head coach Norman G. Wann, the team compiled a 5–2–1 record and outscored opponents by a total of 151 to 108. The team played its home games at the North Walnut Street Ball Park in Muncie, Indiana.

The team's high scorer was Gerald "Jack" Liggett who played at both the halfback and fullback positions. Other players included Robert Walburn, George Smith, Maurice Mitchell, Robert Harper, Leonard Newman, Wayne Shields, Ivan Roetken, Herbert Faris, Robert Ziegler, James Leaky, and Earl Martin.

Coach Wann left the school in June 1928 in order to pursue a master's degree at the University of Wisconsin. In two seasons under Wann, the Hoosieroons compiled a record of 10–3–2.

== Schedule ==
Date	Opponent	Site	Result	Attendance	Source
September 24	at Butler	Irwin Field; Indianapolis, IN	L 12–46		
October 7	Franklin (IN)	North Walnut Street Ball Park; Muncie, IN	W 13–0		
October 15	Central Normal	North Walnut Street Ball Park; Muncie, IN	L 0–18		
October 22	at Indiana Central	Indianapolis, IN	T 12–12		
October 29	Oakland City	Walnut Street Park; Muncie, IN	W 32–7		
November 5	Cedarville	North Walnut Street Ball Park; Muncie, IN	W 43–0		
November 12	at Hanover	Hanover, IN	W 12–6		
November 19	Defiance^{†}	North Walnut Street Ball Park; Muncie, IN	W 27–19		
^{†}Homecoming
