= 1927 Coe Crimson football team =

American college football season

1927 Coe Crimson football
- Conference: Midwest Conference
- Record: 4–3–1 (3–2 MWC)
- Head coach: Moray Eby (14th season)
- Home stadium: Coe Field

1927 Midwest Conference football standings
	Conf.					Overall
Team	W		L		T	W		L		T
Cornell (IA) $	6	–	0	–	0	7	–	1	–	0
Carleton	3	–	1	–	0	6	–	1	–	0
Coe	3	–	2	–	0	4	–	3	–	1
Knox	2	–	2	–	0	4	–	4	–	0
Ripon	2	–	2	–	0	3	–	3	–	1
Hamline	1	–	1	–	0	2	–	4	–	1
Lawrence	1	–	2	–	0	2	–	5	–	0
Monmouth (IL)	1	–	3	–	0	4	–	4	–	0
Beloit	0	–	6	–	0	1	–	6	–	1
$ – Conference champion

The 1927 Coe Crimson football team represented Coe College as a member of the Midwest Conference (MWC) during the 1927 college football season. Led by 14th-year head coach Moray Eby, the Kohawks compiled an overall record 4–3–1 with a mark of 3–2 in conference play, placing third in the MWC. The team played home games at Coe Field in Cedar Rapids, Iowa.

== Schedule ==
Date	Time	Opponent	Site	Result	Attendance	Source
October 1		at Notre Dame*	Cartier Field; Notre Dame, IN	L 7–28	10,000	
October 8		at Monmouth (IL)	Monmouth, IL	W 24–3		
October 14		at Carroll (WI)*	Waukesha, WI	T 12–12	3,000	
October 22		Saint Louis*	St. Louis, MO	W 7–0		
October 29	3:00 p.m.	Cornell (IA)^{†}	Coe Field; Cedar Rapids, IA	L 0–3		
November 4	2:30 p.m.	Knox	Coe Field; Cedar Rapids, IA	W 6–0		
November 12		at Carleton	Northfield, MN	L 12–13		
November 19		Beloit	Coe Field; Cedar Rapids, IA	W 74–0		
*Non-conference game; ^{†}Homecoming
