= 1927 Notre Dame Fighting Irish football team =

American college football season

1927 Notre Dame Fighting Irish football
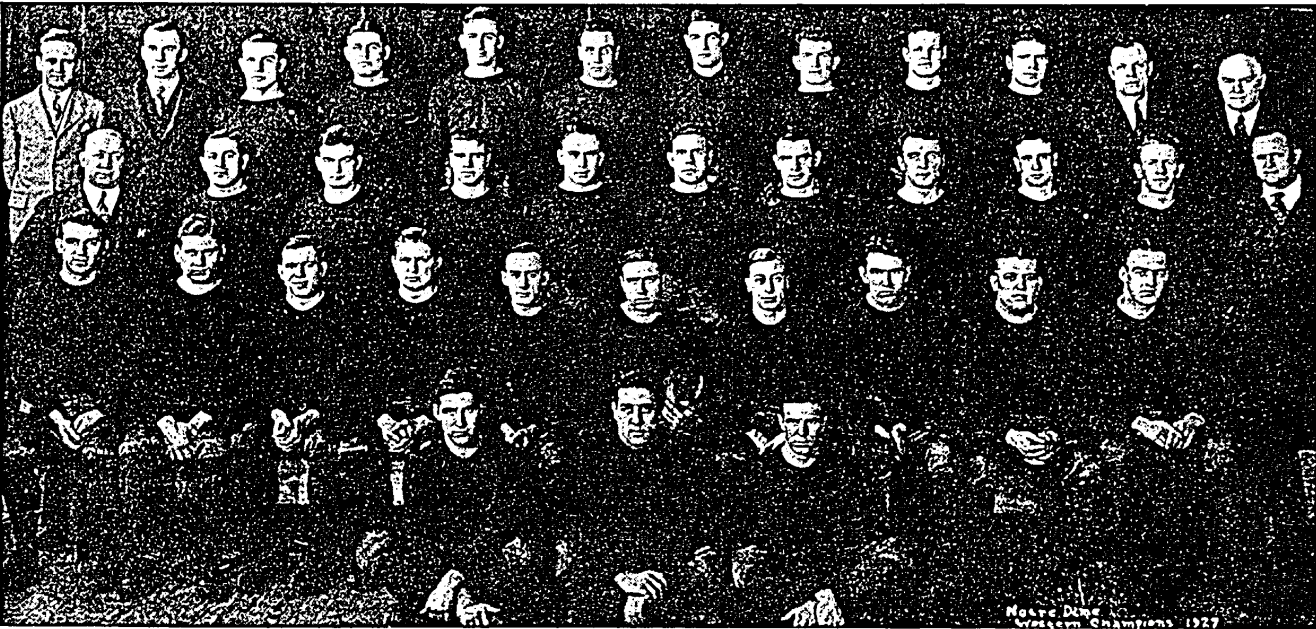
- "The 1927 Varsity"

National champion (Houlgate)
- Conference: Independent
- Record: 7–1–1
- Head coach: Knute Rockne (10th season)
- Offensive scheme: Notre Dame Box
- Base defense: 7–2–2
- Captain: Clipper Smith
- Home stadium: Cartier Field

1927 Midwestern college football independents records
	Conf.			Overall
Team	W	L	T	W		L		T
No. 4 Notre Dame		–		7	–	2	–	1
Detroit		–		7	–	2	–	0
Ball Teachers		–		5	–	2	–	1
Marquette		–		6	–	3	–	0
Michigan Tech		–		2	–	1	–	0
Haskell		–		5	–	3	–	1
Butler		–		4	–	3	–	1
John Carroll		–		3	–	2	–	3
Saint Louis		–		5	–	5	–	0
Lombard		–		4	–	4	–	0
Loyola (IL)		–		4	–	4	–	0
Michigan State		–		4	–	5	–	0
Northern Illinois State		–		1	–	4	–	1
Kent State		–		1	–	5	–	1
Valparaiso		–		1	–	5	–	0
Rankings from Dickinson System

The 1927 Notre Dame Fighting Irish football team was an American football team that represented the University of Notre Dame as an independent during the 1927 college football season. In their tenth year under head coach Knute Rockne, the Irish compiled a 7–1–1 record and outscored opponents by a total of 158 to 57. They defeated Navy, Indiana, Georgia Tech, and USC, but lost to Army and tied with Minnesota in consecutive games in November.

Although most selectors named either Illinois or Georgia as the 1927 national champion, Notre Dame was retroactively named as the national champion by one selector, the Houlgate System. The team was ranked No. 4 in the nation in the Dickinson System ratings released in December 1927.

Notre Dame guard and team captain Clipper Smith was a consensus first-team honoree on the 1927 All-America college football team. Halfback Christie Flanagan received first-team All-America honors from the United Press and Central Press.

The team played its home games at Cartier Field in Notre Dame, Indiana.

== Schedule ==
Date	Opponent	Site	Result	Attendance	Source
October 1	Coe	Cartier Field; Notre Dame, IN	W 28–7	10,000	
October 8	at Detroit	University of Detroit Stadium; Detroit, MI	W 20–0	28,000	
October 15	vs. Navy	Municipal Stadium; Baltimore, MD (rivalry)	W 19–6	45,101	
October 22	at Indiana	Memorial Stadium; Bloomington, IN	W 19–6	16,000	
October 29	Georgia Tech	Cartier Field; Notre Dame, IN (rivalry)	W 26–7	17,000	
November 5	Minnesota	Cartier Field; Notre Dame, IN	T 7–7	25,000	
November 12	vs. Army	Yankee Stadium; Bronx, NY (rivalry)	L 0–18	65,678	
November 19	at Drake	Drake Stadium; Des Moines, IA	W 32–0	8,412	
November 26	vs. USC	Soldier Field; Chicago, IL (rivalry)	W 7–6	115,000	

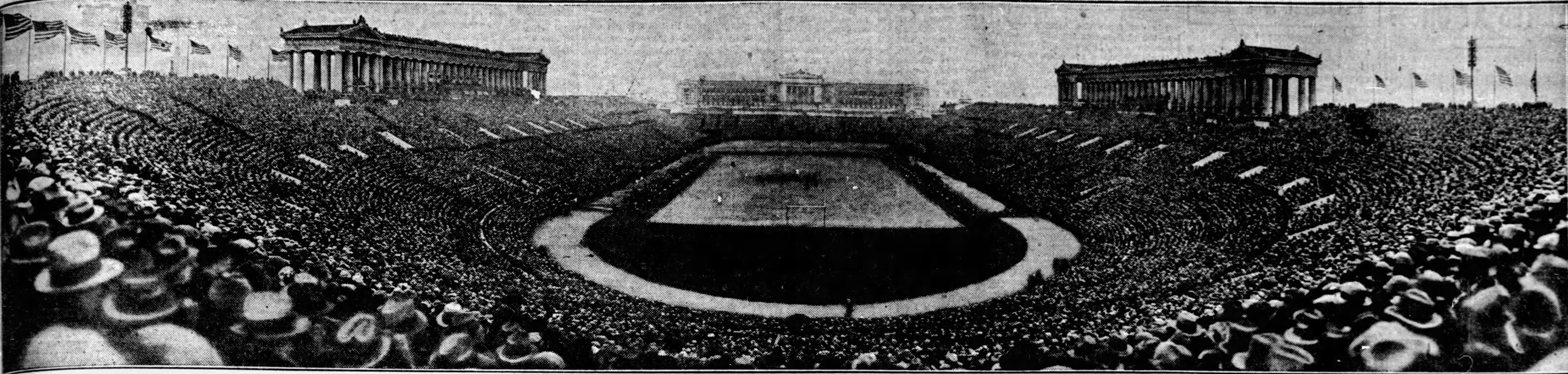
Notre Dame plays USC at Soldier Field in Chicago

== Personnel ==
=== Players ===
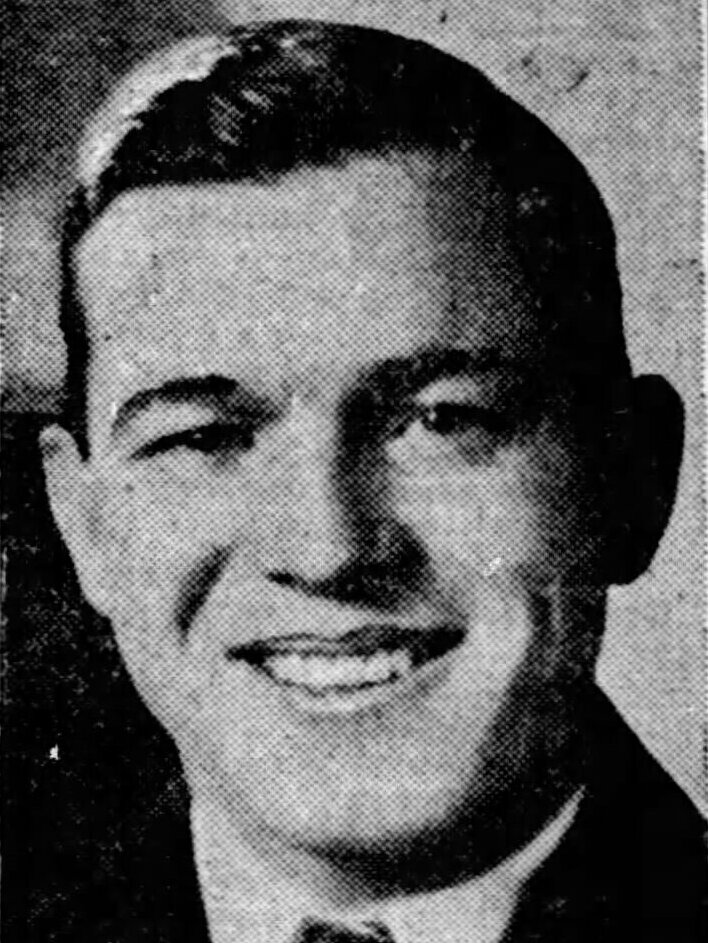
Christie Flanagan

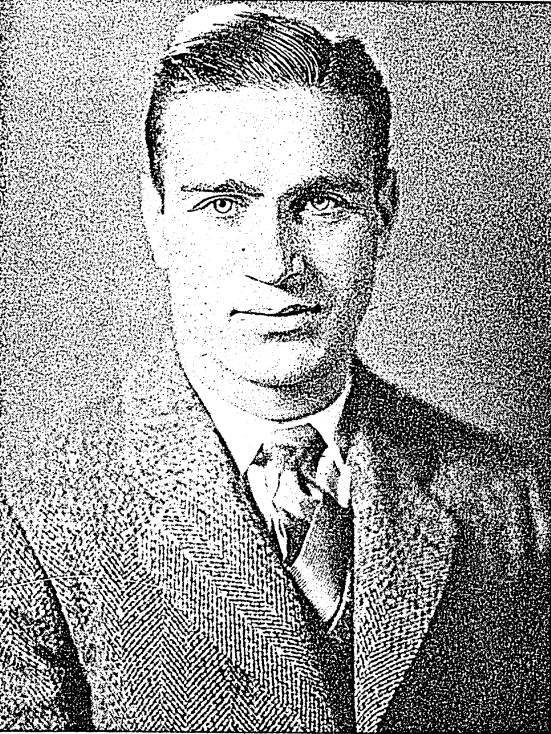
John P. "Clipper" Smith

- Joe Benda, end, Duluth, Minnesota
- Gus Bondi, guard
- Jim Brady, quarterback, Pocatello, Idaho
- Jim Bray, halfback, Kansas City, Missouri
- Thomas Byrne, end, Cleveland
- Jack Cannon, guard
- Joe Cannon, Columbus, Ohio
- Jack Chevigny, halfback, Hammond, Indiana
- John Colerick, end, Newark, New Jersey
- Eddie Collins, end, chicago
- Fred Collins, fullback, Portland, Oregon
- Raymond "Bucky" Dahman, halfback, Youngstown, Ohio
- William Dew, fullback, Fond du Lac (town), Wisconsin
- Dick Donahue, tackle, Auburn, New York
- John Doran, tackle, Omaha, Nebraska
- Jack Elder, halfback, Louisville, Kentucky
- Christie Flanagan, halfback, Port Arthur, Texas
- John Frederick, center, Saginaw, Michigan
- Jim Hurlbert, end, New York City
- William "Red" Hurley, halfback, Springfield, Massachusetts
- John B. Law, guard, New York City
- George Leppig, guard, Cleveland
- Joe Locke, guard, Chicago
- Frank McCarthy, center, Indianapolis
- Jack McGrath, tackle, Cleveland
- Charles McKinney, quarterback, Philadelphia
- Fred Miller, tackle, Milwaukee
- Joe Morrissey, quarterback, Danville, Illinois
- Tim Moynihan, center, Chicago
- Tom Murphy, end, Bridgeport, Connecticut
- George "Chunk" Murrin, guard, Parkersburg, West Virginia
- John "Butch" Niemiec, halfback, Bellaire, Ohio
- Bull Polisky, tackle, Bellaire, Ohio
- Joe Prelli, Oakland, California
- Jerry Ransavage, tackle, Kingston, Pennsylvania
- Charles Riley, quarterback, Indianapolis
- Dinny Shay, fullback
- Clipper Smith, guard, Hartford, Connecticut
- John "Ike" Voedisch, end, South Bend, Indiana
- Chile Walsh, end, Hollywood, California
- Elmer Wynne, fullback

=== Coaching staff ===
- Head coach: Knute Rockne
- Assistant coaches: Hunk Anderson, Thomas Mills
- Freshman coaches: John J. Wallace, John V. McManmon
- Head manager: August M. Grams
- Associate manager: E. Bolan Burke
- Head cheer leader: Robert E. Kirby
