= 1927 Michigan State Spartans football team =

American college football season

1927 Michigan State Spartans football
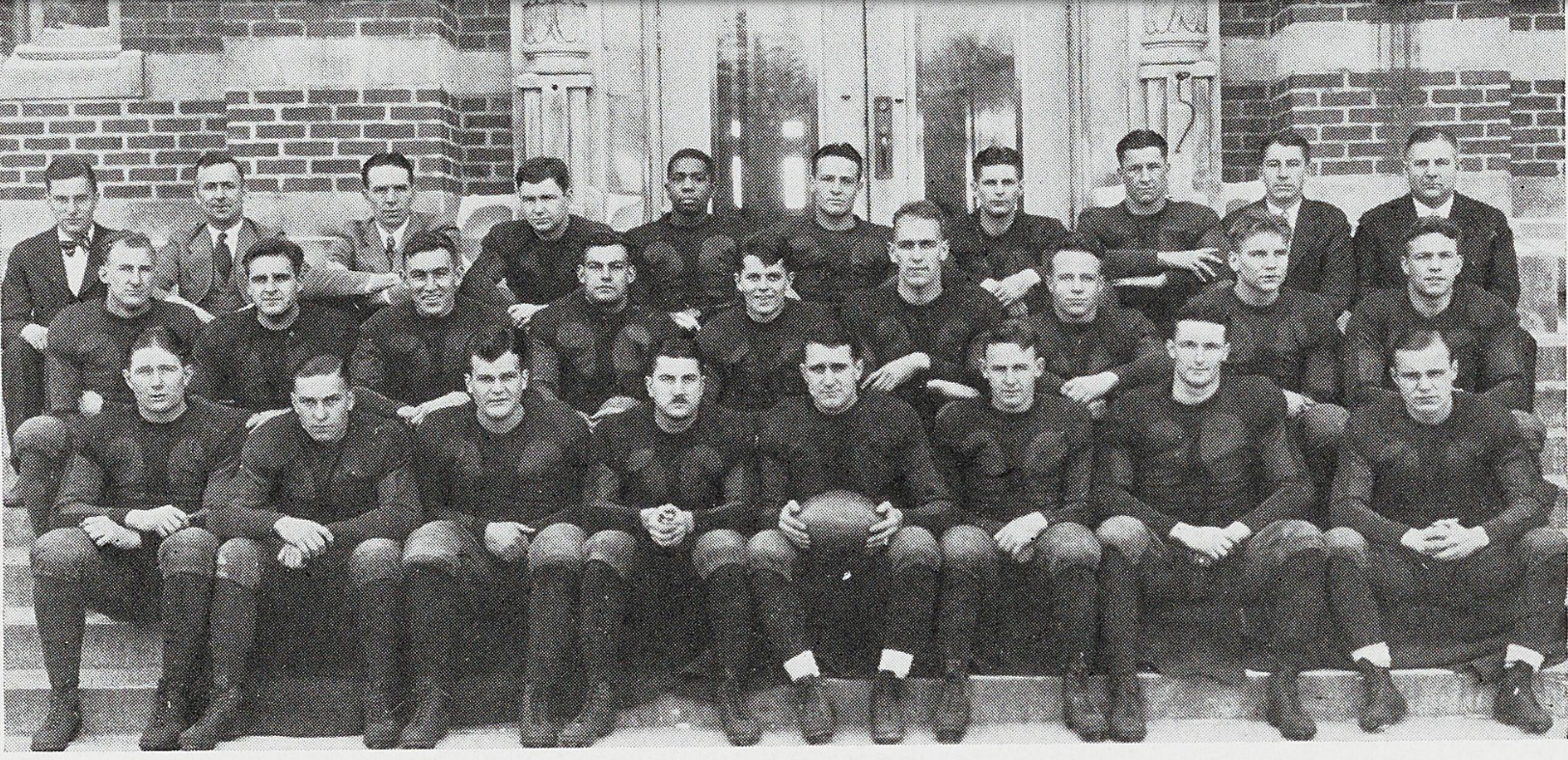
- Conference: Independent
- Record: 4–5
- Head coach: Ralph H. Young (5th season)
- Captain: Paul M. Smith
- Home stadium: College Field

1927 Midwestern college football independents records
	Conf.			Overall
Team	W	L	T	W		L		T
No. 4 Notre Dame		–		7	–	2	–	1
Detroit		–		7	–	2	–	0
Ball Teachers		–		5	–	2	–	1
Marquette		–		6	–	3	–	0
Michigan Tech		–		2	–	1	–	0
Haskell		–		5	–	3	–	1
Butler		–		4	–	3	–	1
John Carroll		–		3	–	2	–	3
Saint Louis		–		5	–	5	–	0
Lombard		–		4	–	4	–	0
Loyola (IL)		–		4	–	4	–	0
Michigan State		–		4	–	5	–	0
Northern Illinois State		–		1	–	4	–	1
Kent State		–		1	–	5	–	1
Valparaiso		–		1	–	5	–	0
Rankings from Dickinson System

The 1927 Michigan State Spartans football team represented Michigan State College as an independent during the 1927 college football season. In their fifth year under head coach Ralph H. Young, the Spartans compiled a 4–5 record and were outscored by their opponents 128 to 111.

== Schedule ==
Date	Opponent	Site	Result	Attendance	Source
September 24	Kalamazoo	College Field; East Lansing, MI	W 12–6		
October 1	Ohio	College Field; East Lansing, MI	W 27–0		
October 8	at Michigan	Michigan Stadium; Ann Arbor, MI (rivalry)	L 0–21	27,864	
October 15	Cornell (IA)	College Field; East Lansing, MI	L 13–19		
October 29	Detroit^{†}	College Field; East Lansing, MI	L 7–24		
November 5	at Indiana	Memorial Stadium; Bloomington, IN (rivalry)	L 7–33		
November 11	Albion	College Field; East Lansing, MI	W 20–6		
November 19	Butler	College Field; East Lansing, MI	W 25–0		
December 3	at NC State	Riddick Stadium; Raleigh, NC	L 0–19		
^{†}Homecoming

== Game summaries ==
=== Michigan ===
Michigan State at Michigan

Team	1	2	3	4	Total
Michigan State	0	0	0	0	0
• Michigan	7	7	0	7	21

- Date: October 27, 1927
- Location: Michigan Stadium
  Ann Arbor, MI

On October 8, 1927, Michigan State lost to Michigan by a 21–0 score. Michigan's first two touchdowns came on running plays by halfback Louis Gilbert and fullback George Rich, and the third came on a pass from quarterback Leo Hoffman to left end Bennie Oosterbaan.

=== NC State ===
Michigan State at NC State

Team	1	2	3	4	Total
Michigan State	0	0	0	0	0
• NC State	6	0	7	6	19

- Date: December 3, 1927
- Location: Riddick Stadium
  Raleigh, NC
- Game weather: Rain

In the season's final game, Michigan State traveled south to Raleigh to play NC State. On a muddy, waterlogged field, NC State won 19 to 0. The NC State team claims a Southern Conference title this year, with this contest arguably its third biggest win after the wins over Florida and Clemson. Their captain and hall of famer Jack McDowall was cited as the best player in this his final game, despite his only scoring play being a pass for an extra point.
