= 1927 Marquette Golden Avalanche football team =

American college football season

1927 Marquette Golden Avalanche football
- Conference: Independent
- Record: 6–3
- Head coach: Frank Murray (6th season)
- Home stadium: Marquette Stadium

1927 Midwestern college football independents records
	Conf.			Overall
Team	W	L	T	W		L		T
No. 4 Notre Dame		–		7	–	2	–	1
Detroit		–		7	–	2	–	0
Ball Teachers		–		5	–	2	–	1
Marquette		–		6	–	3	–	0
Michigan Tech		–		2	–	1	–	0
Haskell		–		5	–	3	–	1
Butler		–		4	–	3	–	1
John Carroll		–		3	–	2	–	3
Saint Louis		–		5	–	5	–	0
Lombard		–		4	–	4	–	0
Loyola (IL)		–		4	–	4	–	0
Michigan State		–		4	–	5	–	0
Northern Illinois State		–		1	–	4	–	1
Kent State		–		1	–	5	–	1
Valparaiso		–		1	–	5	–	0
Rankings from Dickinson System

The 1927 Marquette Golden Avalanche football team was an American football team that represented Marquette University as an independent during the 1927 college football season. In its sixth season under head coach Frank Murray, the team compiled a 6–3 record, shut out five of nine opponents, and outscored all opponents by a total of 153 to 49. The team played its home games at Marquette Stadium in Milwaukee.

Frank Murray was Marquette's head football coach for 19 years and was posthumously inducted into the College Football Hall of Fame in 1983.

== Schedule ==
Date	Opponent	Site	Result	Attendance	Source
September 24	St. Viator	Marquette Stadium; Milwaukee, WI	W 29–0		
October 1	Lawrence	Marquette Stadium; Milwaukee, WI	W 9–0		
October 8	at Army	Michie Stadium; West Point, NY	L 12–21		
October 15	at Oklahoma A&M	Lewis Field; Stillwater, OK	L 0–8	8,000	
October 22	at Creighton	Omaha, NE	L 0–14	10,000	
October 29	Grinnell	Marquette Stadium; Milwaukee, WI	W 31–0	10,000	
November 5	at Saint Louis	Sportsman's Park; St. Louis, MO	W 26–0	7,000	
November 12	Holy Cross	Marquette Stadium; Milwaukee, WI	W 12–6	10,000	
November 24	Iowa State	Marquette Stadium; Milwaukee, WI	W 34–0	15,000	
