= Glenn Drahn =

American football player and coach

Biographical details
- Born: c. Dec 1929; Monona, Iowa, U.S.
- Died: May 6, 2025

Playing career

Football
- 1947–1950: Iowa
- Position: Quarterback

Coaching career (HC unless noted)

Football
- 1957–1959: Belle Plaine HS (IA)
- 1960–1970: Coe

Baseball
- 1967–1970: Coe

Head coaching record
- Overall: 49–39–2 (college football); 18–33 (college baseball)

Glenn Drahn (born c. 1929) is an American former football player and coach. He was selected by the Philadelphia Eagles in the 25th round of the 1951 NFL draft. After serving as a high school coach in Belle Plaine, Iowa, Drahn was the head football coach at Coe College in Cedar Rapids, Iowa from 1960 to 1970, compiling a record of 49–39–2. He was also the head baseball coach at Coe from 1967 to 1970, tallying a mark of 18–33.
