= 1927 Haskell Indians football team =

American college football season

1927 Haskell Indians football
- Conference: Independent
- Record: 5–3–1
- Head coach: John Webster Thomas (1st season)
- Captain: Albert Hawley
- Home stadium: Haskell Stadium

1927 Midwestern college football independents records
	Conf.			Overall
Team	W	L	T	W		L		T
No. 4 Notre Dame		–		7	–	2	–	1
Detroit		–		7	–	2	–	0
Ball Teachers		–		5	–	2	–	1
Marquette		–		6	–	3	–	0
Michigan Tech		–		2	–	1	–	0
Haskell		–		5	–	3	–	1
Butler		–		4	–	3	–	1
John Carroll		–		3	–	2	–	3
Saint Louis		–		5	–	5	–	0
Lombard		–		4	–	4	–	0
Loyola (IL)		–		4	–	4	–	0
Michigan State		–		4	–	5	–	0
Northern Illinois State		–		1	–	4	–	1
Kent State		–		1	–	5	–	1
Valparaiso		–		1	–	5	–	0
Rankings from Dickinson System

The 1927 Haskell Indians football team was an American football that represented the Haskell Institute (now known as Haskell Indian Nations University) during the 1927 college football season. In its first year under head coach John Webster Thomas, the team compiled a 5–3–1 record. John Levi and Egbert "Egg" Ward were assistant coaches.

Albert Hawley was the team captain. Five Haskell players were selected by Leslie Edmonds to his 1927 All-Kansas team: Dave Bible as a first-team tackle; Hawley as the first-team center; Fritz as a second-team tackle; Cross as a second-team halfback; and Ward as a third-team guard.

== Schedule ==
Date	Opponent	Site	Result	Attendance	Source
October 1	Kirksville Osteopaths	Lawrence, KS	W 14–0		
October 8	at Morningside	Sioux City, IA	W 15–14		
October 15	Des Moines	Lawrence, KS	W 13–0		
October 22	at Oklahoma City	Western League Park; Oklahoma City, OK	L 0–7		
October 29	at Regis	Denver, CO	W 7–6		
November 5	at Detroit	University of Detroit Stadium; Detroit, MI	L 7–38		
November 12	Loyola (LA)	Lawrence, KS	W 3–0		
November 19	at Dayton	Dayton, OH	L 14–20		
November 24	at St. Xavier	Corcoran Field; Cincinnati, OH	T 6–6		
