= 1922 Coe Crimson football team =

American college football season

1922 Coe Crimson football

MWC co-champion
- Conference: Midwest Conference
- Record: 7–0 (2–0 MWC)
- Head coach: Moray Eby (9th season)
- Captain: Harold Turner
- Home stadium: Coe Field

1922 Midwest Conference football standings
	Conf.					Overall
Team	W		L		T	W		L		T
Coe +	2	–	0	–	0	7	–	0	–	0
Lawrence +	2	–	0	–	1	6	–	0	–	1
Millikin +	1	–	0	–	0	3	–	4	–	2
Hamline	2	–	1	–	0	4	–	2	–	1
Carleton	1	–	1	–	0	4	–	3	–	0
Knox	1	–	3	–	0	2	–	7	–	0
Beloit	0	–	1	–	1	3	–	3	–	1
Cornell (IA)	0	–	3	–	0	3	–	5	–	0
+ – Conference co-champions

The 1922 Coe Crimson football team represented Coe College as a member of the newly-formed Midwest Conference (MWC) during the 1922 college football season. Led by ninth-year head coach Moray Eby, the Kohawks compiled a perfect overall record of 7–0 with a mark of 2–0 in conference play, sharing the MWC title with Lawrence and Millikin. The team held every opponent to seven or fewer points, including a 24–0 shutout against Iowa State, and outscored all opponents by a total of 136 to 20.

Halfback George Collins was the team's leading scorer with seven touchdowns for 42 points. Makeever ranked second with 31 points on three touchdowns, two field goals, and seven extra-point kicks. Collins sustained a fractured jaw in the second quarter of the final game of the season against Cornell, played the entire second half with the injury, and led the team to a comeback victory. Collins was hailed in The Coe College Cosmos as "the greatest half-back who ever wore a Crimson uniform."

The team played home games at Coe Field in Cedar Rapids, Iowa.

Professor C. W. Perkins first proposed the "Kohawks" fight name during the 1922 season. It did not go into effect until the 1928 season. The team had previously been called the "Warriors" and the "Crimson".

== Schedule ==
Date	Time	Opponent	Site	Result	Attendance	Source
September 30	2:30 p.m.	Upper Iowa*	Cedar Rapids, IA	W 14–0		
October 7	2:30 p.m.	at Iowa State*	State Field; Ames, IA	W 24–0		
October 21		Dubuque*	Cedar Rapids, IA	W 29–0		
October 28	2:30 p.m.	Grinnell*^{†}	Coe Field; Cedar Rapids, IA	W 15–0	3,500	
November 4	2:30 p.m.	Albion*	Coe Field; Cedar Rapids, IA	W 21–7		
November 11		at Knox	Galesburg, IL	W 20–6		
November 18		at Cornell (IA)	Ash Park; Mount Vernon, IA	W 13–7	3,500	
*Non-conference game; ^{†}Homecoming; All times are in Central time
