= 1927 Saint Louis Billikens football team =

American college football season

1927 Saint Louis Billikens football
- Conference: Independent
- Record: 5–5
- Head coach: Robert L. Mathews (2nd season)
- Home stadium: St. Louis University Athletic Field, Sportsman's Park

1927 Midwestern college football independents records
| | Conf. | | | Overall |
| Team | W | L | T | W | | L | | T |
|---|---|---|---|---|---|---|---|---|
| No. 4 Notre Dame | | – | | 7 | – | 2 | – | 1 |
| Detroit | | – | | 7 | – | 2 | – | 0 |
| Ball Teachers | | – | | 5 | – | 2 | – | 1 |
| Marquette | | – | | 6 | – | 3 | – | 0 |
| Michigan Tech | | – | | 2 | – | 1 | – | 0 |
| Haskell | | – | | 5 | – | 3 | – | 1 |
| Butler | | – | | 4 | – | 3 | – | 1 |
| John Carroll | | – | | 3 | – | 2 | – | 3 |
| Saint Louis | | – | | 5 | – | 5 | – | 0 |
| Lombard | | – | | 4 | – | 4 | – | 0 |
| Loyola (IL) | | – | | 4 | – | 4 | – | 0 |
| Michigan State | | – | | 4 | – | 5 | – | 0 |
| Northern Illinois State | | – | | 1 | – | 4 | – | 1 |
| Kent State | | – | | 1 | – | 5 | – | 1 |
| Valparaiso | | – | | 1 | – | 5 | – | 0 |
Rankings from Dickinson System

The 1927 Saint Louis Billikens football team was an American football team that represented Saint Louis University as an independent during the 1927 college football season. In their second and final season under head coach Robert L. Mathews, the Billikens compiled a 5–5 record and outscored opponents by a total of 140 to 101. The team played its home games at St. Louis University Athletic Field and Sportsman's Park in St. Louis.

== Schedule ==
| Date | Time | Opponent | Site | Result | Attendance | Source |
|---|---|---|---|---|---|---|
| September 24 | | Southern Illinois | St. Louis University Athletic Field; St. Louis, MO | W 20–6 | 2,000 | |
| October 1 | | Jackson University | St. Louis University Athletic Field; St. Louis, MO | W 69–0 | | |
| October 8 | | Southwest Missouri State | Sportsman's Park; St. Louis, MO | W 7–0 | | |
| October 15 | | at Loyola (IL) | Soldiers Field; Chicago, IL | W 19–0 | | |
| October 22 | | Coe | Sportsman's Park; St. Louis, MO | L 0–7 | | |
| October 29 | | Missouri Mines | Sportsman's Park; St. Louis, MO | W 17–0 | | |
| November 5 | | Marquette | Sportsman's Park; St. Louis, MO | L 0–26 | 7,000 | |
| November 11 | | Detroit^{†} | Sportsman's Park; St. Louis, MO | L 0–21 | | |
| November 19 | | at Creighton | Creighton Stadium; Omaha, NE | L 8–20 | | |
| November 24 | 2:00 p.m. | Washington University | Sportsman's Park; St. Louis, MO | L 0–21 | 18,739 | |
^{†}Homecoming; All times are in Central time
