= Tyler Staker =

American football coach (born c. 1983)

Current position
- Title: Head coach
- Team: Coe
- Conference: ARC
- Record: 76–31

Biographical details
- Born: c. 1984 (age 41–42)
- Education: Coe College (2006)

Playing career
- 2002–2005: Coe
- Position: Defensive back

Coaching career (HC unless noted)
- 2006–2007: Coe (GA/OL/WR)
- 2008–2015: Coe (OC)
- 2016–present: Coe

Head coaching record
- Overall: 76–31
- Tournaments: 2–4 (NCAA D-III playoffs)

Accomplishments and honors

Championships
- As player 3× IIAC (2002, 2004–2005); As coach 2× IIAC (2012, 2016)

Awards
- As player First-Team All-IIAC (2005); Second-Team All-IIAC (2004); As coach AFCA D3 Regional Coach of the Year (2016); IIAC Coach of the Year (2016)

Tyler Staker (born c. 1983) is an American college football coach. He is the head football coach for Coe College, a position he has held since 2016. He is the son of former Coe head football coach Steve Staker.

== Playing career ==
Staker played college football for Coe as a defensive back. From 2002 to 2005 he was a four-year letterwinner and two-time team captain. In 2004 he earned Second-Team All-IIAC honors and in 2005 he earned First-Team All-IIAC honors. In his four-year career with the school he helped lead them to an overall record of 29–14 and three IIAC championships.

== Coaching career ==
After graduating, Staker joined Coe's coaching staff as a graduate assistant, offensive line, and wide receivers coach for two seasons in 2006. In 2008 he was promoted to the role of offensive coordinator. In 2012 his offense helped lead the team to an IIAC championship. During his eight-year stint as offensive coordinator the Kohawks garnered an overall record of 51–23 and three NCAA Division III Playoff appearances.

In 2016, following the retirement of Staker's father, Steve, he took over as head coach. In his first season as head coach he led the team to an 11–1 record including an IIAC championship and a trip to the Division III Playoffs. In the team's first playoff game they defeated Monmouth (IL) 21–14 before falling to St. Thomas in the second round 6–55. After the season he was named IIAC Coach of the Year along with being named the AFCA D3 Regional Coach of the Year. In 2021, he had his best season since his inaugural season as he went 8–2 overall and 6–2 in conference play.

== Head coaching record ==
Year	Team	Overall	Conference	Standing	Bowl/playoffs	AFCA^{#}	D3^{°}
Coe Kohawks (Iowa Conference / American Rivers Conference) (2016–present)
2016	Coe	11–1	8–0	1st	L NCAA Division III Second Round	17	
2017	Coe	4–6	2–6	T–7th			
2018	Coe	6–4	5–3	5th			
2019	Coe	6–4	5–3	4th			
2020–21	Coe	0–1	0–0	N/A			
2021	Coe	8–2	6–2	3rd			
2022	Coe	7–3	6–2	2nd			
2023	Coe	9–2	7–1	2nd	L NCAA Division III First Round		
2024	Coe	9–2	7–1	2nd	L NCAA Division III First Round		
2025	Coe	9–3	7–1	2nd	L NCAA Division III Second Round		25
2026	Coe	7–3	6–1	2nd			
Coe:		76–31	59–20				
Total:		76–31					
National championship Conference title Conference division title or championship game berth

== Personal life ==
Staker is the son of former Coe College head coach Steve Staker.
