= 1952 Coe Kohawks football team =

American college football season

1952 Coe Kohawks football

MWC champion
- Conference: Midwest Conference
- Record: 7–1 (6–0 MWC)
- Head coach: Dick Clausen (5th season)
- Home stadium: Kingston Stadium

1952 Midwest Conference football standings
	Conf.					Overall
Team	W		L		T	W		L		T
Coe $	6	–	0	–	0	7	–	1	–	0
Lawrence	6	–	1	–	0	7	–	1	–	0
Monmouth (IL)	4	–	2	–	0	6	–	2	–	0
St. Olaf	4	–	2	–	0	5	–	3	–	0
Carleton	3	–	4	–	0	3	–	5	–	0
Knox	3	–	4	–	0	3	–	5	–	0
Ripon	2	–	4	–	0	3	–	4	–	0
Cornell (IA)	1	–	6	–	0	2	–	6	–	0
Grinnell	0	–	7	–	0	0	–	8	–	0
$ – Conference champion

The 1952 Coe Kohawks football team represented Coe College as a member of the Midwest Conference (MWC) during the 1952 college football season. Led by fifth-year head coach Dick Clausen, the Kohawks compiled an overall record of 7–1 with a mark of 6–0 in conference play, winning the MWC title. Coe played home games at the newly opened Kingston Stadium in Cedar Rapids, Iowa.

== Schedule ==
Date	Time	Opponent	Site	Result	Attendance	Source
September 20		at Grinnell	Kingston Stadium; Cedar Rapids, IA	W 21–7	3,500	
September 27		at Knox	Galesburg, IL	W 22–6		
October 4	8:00 p.m.	at Iowa State Teachers*	O. R. Latham Stadium; Cedar Falls, IA	L 24–27		
October 11	2:00 p.m.	at Wabash*	Ingalls Field; Crawfordsville, IN	W 28–27		
October 18	7:30 p.m.	Cornell (IA)^{†}	Kingston Stadium; Cedar Rapids, IA	W 21–0	5,000	
October 25		at Monmouth (IL)	Monmouth, IL	W 28–26		
November 1		at Ripon	Ripon, WI	W 16–7		
November 8	1:30 p.m.	Lawrence	Kingston Stadium; Cedar Rapids, IA	W 12–6	3,500	
*Non-conference game; ^{†}Homecoming; All times are in Central time
