= 1927 Loyola Ramblers football team =

American college football season

1927 Loyola Ramblers football
- Conference: Independent
- Record: 4–4
- Head coach: Roger Kiley (5th season)
- Home stadium: Loyola Field; Soldier Field

1927 Midwestern college football independents records
	Conf.			Overall
Team	W	L	T	W		L		T
No. 4 Notre Dame		–		7	–	2	–	1
Detroit		–		7	–	2	–	0
Ball Teachers		–		5	–	2	–	1
Marquette		–		6	–	3	–	0
Michigan Tech		–		2	–	1	–	0
Haskell		–		5	–	3	–	1
Butler		–		4	–	3	–	1
John Carroll		–		3	–	2	–	3
Saint Louis		–		5	–	5	–	0
Lombard		–		4	–	4	–	0
Loyola (IL)		–		4	–	4	–	0
Michigan State		–		4	–	5	–	0
Northern Illinois State		–		1	–	4	–	1
Kent State		–		1	–	5	–	1
Valparaiso		–		1	–	5	–	0
Rankings from Dickinson System

The 1927 Loyola Ramblers football team was an American football team that represented Loyola University Chicago as an independent during the 1927 college football season. Led by Roger Kiley in his fifth season as head coach, the Ramblers compiled an overall record of 4–4.

== Schedule ==
Date	Opponent	Site	Result	Source
October 1	Crane Junior College	Loyola Field; Chicago, IL	W 45–0	
October 8	at St. Thomas (MN)	Cadet Field; Saint Paul, MN	W 14–0	
October 15	Saint Louis	Soldier Field; Chicago, IL	L 0–19	
October 22	Millikin	Loyola Field; Chicago, IL	W 26–7	
October 29	at DePaul	Wrigley Field; Chicago, IL	L 6–12	
November 5	Dayton	Soldier Field; Chicago, IL	L 0–12	
November 11	at Ole Miss	League Park; Jackson, MS	W 7–6	
November 19	at Loyola (LA)	Loyola University Stadium; New Orleans, LA	L 12–19	
