= Glenn Caruso =

American football player and coach (born 1974)

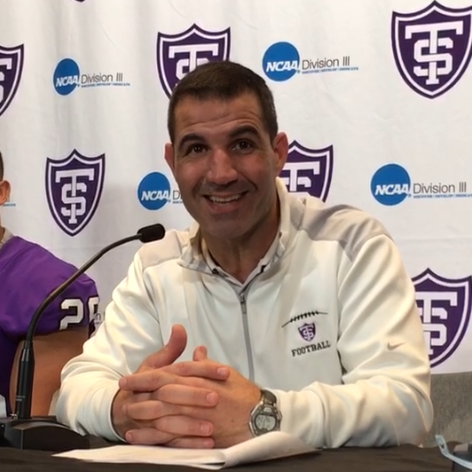
- Caruso in 2019

Current position
- Title: Head coach
- Team: St. Thomas (MN)
- Conference: PFL
- Record: 170–41

Biographical details
- Born: May 20, 1974 (age 52); Greenwich, Connecticut, U.S.

Playing career
- 1992–1995: Ithaca
- Position: Center

Coaching career (HC unless noted)
- 1996: Ithaca (GA/OL)
- 1997–2002: North Dakota State (OC/RB/TE)
- 2003: Wisconsin–Eau Claire (OC/OL)
- 2004–2005: South Dakota (OC/QB)
- 2006–2007: Macalester
- 2008–present: St. Thomas (MN)

Head coaching record
- Overall: 176–53
- Tournaments: 19–8 (NCAA D-III playoffs)

Accomplishments and honors

Championships
- 7 MIAC (2010–2012, 2015–2017, 2019); 1 PFL (2022)

Awards
- 3× Liberty Mutual COY (2010–2012); 2× AFCA NCAA Division III COY (2012, 2015); 6× MIAC Coach of the Year (2010–2012, 2015–2017)

Glenn Caruso (born May 20, 1974) is an American football coach. He is the head football coach at the University of St. Thomas in Saint Paul, Minnesota, a position he had held since the 2008 season. Caruso served as the head football coach at Macalester College from 2006 to 2007. He has been awarded the Liberty Mutual Coach of the Year Award for NCAA Division III three times: 2010, 2011 and 2012.

== Early life ==
Caruso was born to Mr. & Mrs. Frank Caruso. His father was a lawyer in the Greenwich, Connecticut area. At the age of four, Caruso was diagnosed with leukemia. After hearing that his son wouldn't live until his fifth birthday, Frank Caruso drove his family to the Basilica of Sainte-Anne-de-Beaupré to pray for healing; Glenn ended up recovering from the disease. Caruso's mother died when he was eight. He was a lineman for Greenwich High School, and was the starting center at Ithaca College. He considered law school, but eventually was hired by North Dakota State head coach Bob Babich.

In 1998 he was on a committee for the Special Olympics, where he met his wife.

== Coaching ==
=== Macalester ===
Caruso served as the head football coach at Macalester College from 2006 to 2007. His the Scots to records of 2–7 in 2006 and 4–5 in 2007.

=== St. Thomas (MN) ===
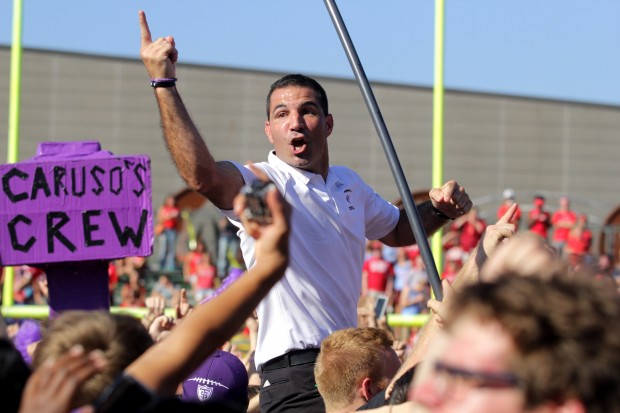
Caruso in 2016.

In his first season at the University of St. Thomas, in 2008, Caruso led the Tommies to a 7–3 record after the team had finished 2–8 the previous year.

After guiding the 2015 Tommies to the NCAA Division III football championship title game with a 14–1 record, Caruso was voted by his peers as the Division III National Coach of the Year by the American Football Coaches Association (AFCA). During 2021 Caruso led St. Thomas' unprecedented leap from NCAA Division III to NCAA Division I Football Championship Subdivision. In the school's first year at the Division I level, St. Thomas posted a 7–3 record and finished third in the Pioneer Football League (PFL). In 2022. Caruso led St. Thomas to a PFL title with an undefeated record in conference play.

== Personal life ==
Caruso married his wife, Rachael, on Memorial Day weekend in 2001. They have three children: Anna, Cade, and Truman. Rachael was diagnosed with cancer in 2017. Caruso is a Catholic and considers "faith, family, and football" to be the most important things in his life.

== Head coaching record ==
Year	Team	Overall	Conference	Standing	Bowl/playoffs	STATS^{#}	Coaches^{°}
Macalester Scots (NCAA Division III independent) (2006–2007)
2006	Macalester	2–7					
2007	Macalester	4–5					
Macalester:		6–12					
St. Thomas Tommies (Minnesota Intercollegiate Athletic Conference) (2008–2020)
2008	St. Thomas	7–3	5–3	T–2nd			
2009	St. Thomas	11–2	7–1	2nd	L NCAA Division III Quarterfinal		
2010	St. Thomas	12–1	8–0	1st	L NCAA Division III Quarterfinal		
2011	St. Thomas	13–1	8–0	1st	L NCAA Division III Semifinal		
2012	St. Thomas	14–1	8–0	1st	L NCAA Division III Championship		
2013	St. Thomas	8–2	6–2	T–2nd			
2014	St. Thomas	8–3	6–2	T–2nd	L NCAA Division III First Round		
2015	St. Thomas	14–1	8–0	1st	L NCAA Division III Championship		
2016	St. Thomas	12–1	8–0	1st	L NCAA Division III Quarterfinal		
2017	St. Thomas	11–2	8–0	1st	L NCAA Division III Quarterfinal		
2018	St. Thomas	8–2	6–2	3rd			
2019	St. Thomas	8–2	7–1	T–1st			
2020–21	No team—COVID-19						
St. Thomas Tommies (Pioneer Football League) (2021–present)
2021	St. Thomas	7–3	6–2	T–3rd			
2022	St. Thomas	10–1	8–0	1st			20
2023	St. Thomas	8–3	7–1	2nd			
2024	St. Thomas	6–6	5–3	T–3rd			
2025	St. Thomas	7–5	5–3	T–4th			
2026	St. Thomas	6–2	3–1				
St. Thomas:		170–41	119–22				
Total:		176–53					
National championship Conference title Conference division title or championship game berth
