= 1955 Coe Kohawks football team =

American college football season

1955 Coe Kohawks football

MWC champion
- Conference: Midwest Conference
- Record: 8–0 (7–0 MWC)
- Head coach: Dick Clausen (8th season)
- MVP: Elliott "Shady" Day
- Home stadium: Kingston Stadium

1955 Midwest Conference football standings
	Conf.					Overall
Team	W		L		T	W		L		T
Coe $	7	–	0	–	0	8	–	0	–	0
St. Olaf	6	–	1	–	0	7	–	1	–	0
Carleton	5	–	2	–	0	5	–	3	–	0
Cornell (IA)	4	–	3	–	0	5	–	3	–	0
Grinnell	3	–	4	–	0	4	–	4	–	0
Ripon	2	–	5	–	0	2	–	5	–	1
Knox	1	–	6	–	0	2	–	6	–	0
Monmouth (IL)	0	–	7	–	0	0	–	7	–	0
Lawrence			–			1	–	3	–	1
$ – Conference champion; Lawrence's first three game were cancelled because of a polio epidemic; games against Lawrence were not counted in the conference standings.

The 1955 Coe Kohawks football team represented Coe College as a member of the Midwest Conference (MWC) during the 1955 college football season. Led by Dick Clausen in his eighth and final season as head coach, the Kohawks compiled a perfect overall record of 8–0 with a mark of 7–0 in conference play, winning the MWC title.

After the season, Coe received a "feeler" from representatives of the Tangerine Bowl. To play in a bowl game, Coe needed approval from the other MWC schools. The matter was put to a vote, and the MWC schools voted 6–3 against allowing the Kohawks to play in the bowl.

Quarterback Elliott "Shady" Day was selected as the team's most valuable player. Day completed 38 of 71 passes for 712 yards. End George Cilek was selected as a second-team player on the 1955 Little All-America college football team. Day received honorable mention. John "Crunch" Rosenberg ranked fourth in the nation in scoring among small college players.

Coe played home games at Kingston Stadium in Cedar Rapids, Iowa.

== Schedule ==
Date	Time	Opponent	Site	Result	Attendance	Source
September 17		at Monmouth (IL)	Monmouth, IL	W 33–12		
September 24	7:30 p.m.	at Grinnell	Grinnell, IA	W 39–14		
October 1	1:30 p.m.	Loras*	Kingston Stadium; Cedar Rapids, IA	W 38–12	2,000	
October 8		at Ripon	Ripon, WI	W 34–14		
October 15		Carleton	Kingston Stadium; Cedar Rapids, IA	W 46–14	2,500	
October 22	2:00 p.m.	at Cornell (IA)	Ash Park; Mount Vernon, IA	W 34–12	4,000	
October 29		Knox^{†}	Kingston Stadium; Cedar Rapids, IA	W 33–6	2,000	
November 12		St. Olaf	Kingston Stadium; Cedar Rapids, IA	W 28–14	7,500	
*Non-conference game; ^{†}Homecoming; All times are in Central time
