= Erik Raeburn =

American football player and coach (born 1971)

Current position
- Title: Head coach
- Team: Gannon
- Conference: PSAC
- Record: 23–35

Biographical details
- Born: June 20, 1971 (age 55)

Playing career
- 1987–1990: Mount Union

Coaching career (HC unless noted)
- 1994: Mount Union (assistant)
- 1995–1999: Mount Union (OL)
- 2000–2007: Coe
- 2008–2015: Wabash
- 2016–2018: Savannah State
- 2019: Gannon (OC)
- 2020–present: Gannon

Head coaching record
- Overall: 166–97
- Tournaments: 7–7 (NCAA D-III playoffs)

Accomplishments and honors

Championships
- 3 IIAC (2002, 2004–2005); 3 NCAC (2008, 2011, 2015); 1 PSAC East Division (2022)

Awards
- IIAC Coach of the Year (2002)

Erik Raeburn (born June 20, 1971) is an American college football coach. He is the head football coach for Gannon University, a position he has held since 2020. Raeburn served as head football coach Coe College in Cedar Rapids, Iowa from 2000 to 2007, Wabash College in Crawfordsville, Indiana from 2008 to 2015, and Savannah State University in Savannah, Georgia from 2016 to 2018. He is the nephew of former Mount Union football head coach Larry Kehres.

== Coaching career ==
Raeburn was the head football coach at Coe College in Cedar Rapids, Iowa from 2000 to 2007. His teams compiled a 57–26 record and won the Iowa Intercollegiate Athletic Conference championship three times. On February 2, 2008, Raeburn was named the 32nd head coach at Wabash College in Crawfordsville, Indiana. He served as the head football coach at Wabash from 2008 to 2015.

Raeburn was the head football coach at Savannah State University in Savannah, Georgia from March 28, 2016, until December 7, 2018, when he was relieved of his duties by school's interim athletic director, Opio Mashariki. Raeburn was the 25th head football coach in history of the Savannah State program.

== Head coaching record ==
Year	Team	Overall	Conference	Standing	Bowl/playoffs
Coe Kohawks (Iowa Intercollegiate Athletic Conference) (2000–2007)
2000	Coe	6–4	6–4	T–4th	
2001	Coe	6–4	6–3	T–3rd	
2002	Coe	10–2	8–1	T–1st	L NCAA Division III Second Round
2003	Coe	5–5	3–5	T–6th	
2004	Coe	7–3	6–2	T–1st	
2005	Coe	9–2	7–1	T–1st	L NCAA Division III Quarterfinal
2006	Coe	7–3	5–3	T–3rd	
2007	Coe	7–3	5–3	T–3rd	
Coe:		57–26	46–22		
Wabash Little Giants (North Coast Athletic Conference) (2008–2015)
2008	Wabash	10–2	7–0	1st	L NCAA Division III Second Round
2009	Wabash	9–2	6–1	2nd	L NCAA Division III First Round
2010	Wabash	8–2	5–1	2nd	
2011	Wabash	12–1	6–0	1st	L NCAA Division III Quarterfinal
2012	Wabash	8–2	5–2	T–3rd	
2013	Wabash	9–1	8–1	2nd	
2014	Wabash	10–2	8–1	2nd	L NCAA Division III Second Round
2015	Wabash	12–1	9–0	1st	L NCAA Division III Quarterfinal
Wabash:		78–13	54–6		
Savannah State Tigers (Mid-Eastern Athletic Conference) (2016–2018)
2016	Savannah State	3–7	3–5	T–7th	
2017	Savannah State	3–8	3–5	T–7th	
2018	Savannah State	2–8	1–6	10th	
Savannah State:		8–23	7–16		
Gannon Golden Knights (Pennsylvania State Athletic Conference) (2020–present)
2020–21	Gannon	1–3	0–0	N/A	
2021	Gannon	5–6	3–4	T–4th (West)	
2022	Gannon	8–3	6–1	T–1st (West)	
2023	Gannon	5–6	5–2	3rd (West)	
2024	Gannon	3–7	3–3	T–3rd (West)	
2025	Gannon	1–10	1–5	7th (West)	
Gannon:		23–35	18–15		
Total:		166–97			
National championship Conference title Conference division title or championship game berth
