= 1927 Kent State Golden Flashes football team =

American college football season

1927 Kent State Golden Flashes football
- Conference: Independent
- Record: 1–5–1
- Head coach: Merle E. Wagoner (3rd season)
- Home stadium: Rockwell Field

1927 Midwestern college football independents records
	Conf.			Overall
Team	W	L	T	W		L		T
No. 4 Notre Dame		–		7	–	2	–	1
Detroit		–		7	–	2	–	0
Ball Teachers		–		5	–	2	–	1
Marquette		–		6	–	3	–	0
Michigan Tech		–		2	–	1	–	0
Haskell		–		5	–	3	–	1
Butler		–		4	–	3	–	1
John Carroll		–		3	–	2	–	3
Saint Louis		–		5	–	5	–	0
Lombard		–		4	–	4	–	0
Loyola (IL)		–		4	–	4	–	0
Michigan State		–		4	–	5	–	0
Northern Illinois State		–		1	–	4	–	1
Kent State		–		1	–	5	–	1
Valparaiso		–		1	–	5	–	0
Rankings from Dickinson System

The 1927 Kent State Golden Flashes football team represented Kent State during the 1927 college football season. In its third season under head coach Merle E. Wagoner, Kent State compiled a 1–5–1 record and was outscored by a total of 80 to 25.

On defense, the team was markedly improved, giving up only 79 points in seven games. On offense, however, the team was shut out in five games and totaled only 25 points on the season.

During the football season, students began a band organization. "Although this effort was not as auspicious as it might have been, the seed was sown, and indications are that there will be a strong band next year."

== Schedule ==
Date	Opponent	Site	Result	Source
September 24	at Kenyon	Gambier, OH	T 6–6	
October 8	Slippery Rock	Rockwell Field; Kent, OH	L 0–6	
October 15	Bowling Green	Rockwell Field; Kent, OH (rivalry)	L 0–13	
October 22	Cedarville	Kent, OH	W 19–18	
October 29	at Edinboro	Edinboro, PA	L 0–6	
November 12	at Indiana (PA)	College Field; Indiana, PA	L 0–7	
November 18	at Wilmington	Wilmington, OH	L 0–24	

== Roster ==
The following players participated on the 1927 team:

- Chernin;
- "Curtie" Curtiss, end
- A. Davis, end
- Chet Davis
- H. Dunlavy, guard
- Earley, guard
- W. "Ole" Fisher, halfback
- Graber, tackle
- L. Hinkle, end
- "C Major" Hinkle, guard
- "Cocky" Hinkle, fullback
- "Bob" Kelso, tackle
- Kilbourne;
- W. "Red" McCaslin, tackle
- Donald Menough, quarterback and acting captain
- "Jimmy" Menough, halfback
- "Tiny" Paulus, guard
- Pettay, guard
- "Ted" Sapp, tackle
- Jake Searl, quarterback and captain elect for 1928
- Sloop, halfback
- "Dud" Vair, end
- Claude Vair, manager
