= Wally Schwank =

Biographical details
- Born: May 20, 1912
- Died: February 2, 2009 (aged 96); Lake Forest, California, U.S.

Playing career
- 1931–1933: Coe
- Position: Tackle

Coaching career (HC unless noted)
- 1937–1942: Anamosa HS (IA)
- 1944–1955: Iowa (assistant)
- 1956–1959: Coe
- 1960: South Dakota State (assistant)

Administrative career (AD unless noted)
- 1961–1967: Montana

Head coaching record
- Overall: 25–7 (college)

Accomplishments and honors

Championships
- 2 MWC (1958–1959)

Walter Charles Schwank (May 20, 1912 – February 2, 2009) was an American football coach and college athletics administrator. He served as the head football coach at Coe College in Cedar Rapids, Iowa from 1955 to 1959, compiling a record of 25–7, and as the athletic director at the University of Montana from 1961 to 1967.

== Head coaching record ==
=== College ===
| Year | Team | Overall | Conference | Standing | Bowl/playoffs |
|---|---|---|---|---|---|
Coe Kohawks (Midwest Conference) (1956–1959)
| 1956 | Coe | 4–4 | 4–4 | T–5th | |
| 1957 | Coe | 6–2 | 6–2 | 3rd | |
| 1958 | Coe | 7–1 | 7–1 | 1st | |
| 1959 | Coe | 8–0 | 8–0 | 1st | |
| Coe: | | 25–7 | 25–7 | | |
| Total: | | 25–7 | | | |
National championship Conference title Conference division title or championship game berth
