= Zak Schwank =

American politician (born 1973)

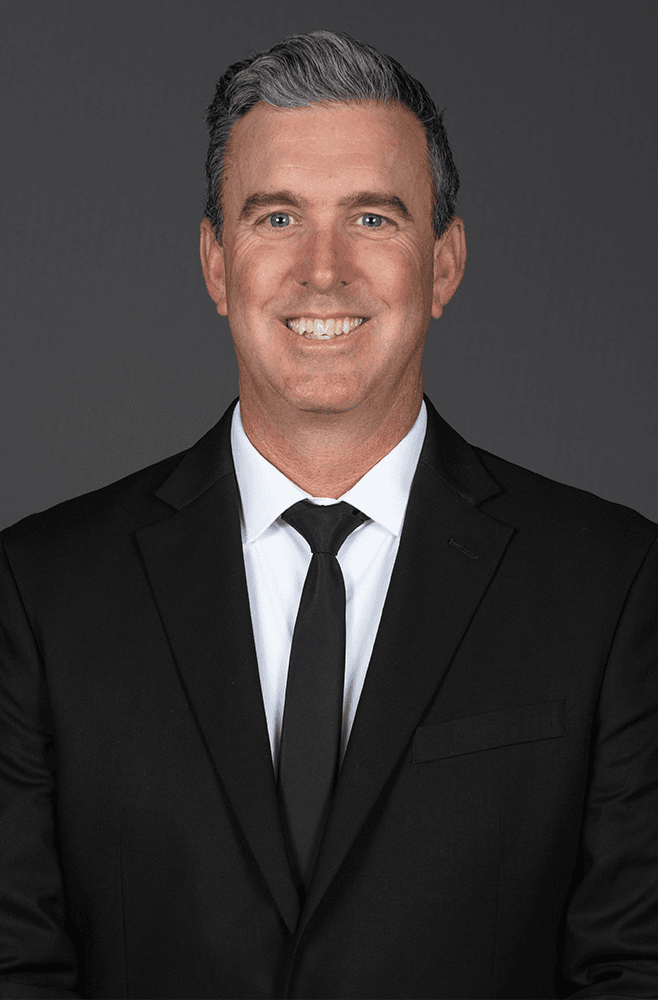
- Schwank in 2022

Mayor of Temecula
- In office December 13, 2022 – January 1, 2023
- Preceded by: Matt Rahn

Member of the Temecula City Council
- Incumbent
- Assumed office December 2018
- Constituency: District 5 (2018-present)

Personal details
- Born: Zak Schwank; March 1, 1973 (age 53) San Diego, California
- Party: Independent
- Children: 3
- Education: University of Riverside PH.D

Zak Schwank is an American politician who has served as the Mayor of Temecula, California, in 2022, and Councilmember representing District 5 on the Temecula City Council. Schwank is known for promoting sustainable transportation, public safety, and quality-of-life initiatives, including the Temecula Bike Train and record-setting nonprofit grant programs. Throughout his career, he has emphasized civic engagement, transparency, and policies that support equitable growth and community development.

== Political career ==
Zak Schwank’s entry into local politics and civic engagement began with his involvement in the Temecula cycling community. In 2011, he helped launch the Temecula Bike Train, a program designed to encourage safe cycling to schools and community events, partnering with local bike shops, schools, and city agencies. The initiative aimed to promote healthy lifestyles, sustainable transportation, and community engagement among residents of all ages. Beyond the Bike Train, Schwank actively participated in city committees and advocacy efforts related to cycling infrastructure, including the development of bike lanes, trails, and multi-use paths throughout Temecula. His early work emphasized the importance of safe, accessible transportation alternatives and demonstrated a commitment to fostering active, environmentally conscious lifestyles. These efforts helped establish his reputation as a proactive, community-focused leader, paving the way for his later roles on the Temecula City Council and as Mayor.

=== City Council & Mayoralty ===
Zak Schwank served as Mayor of Temecula, California, earning recognition for his proactive leadership and dedication to improving the city’s infrastructure and quality of life. He championed the expansion of bike lanes, hiking trails, and multi-use pump track facilities, creating more opportunities for residents to enjoy outdoor recreation and healthy living. Schwank successfully secured significant state and federal funding through the Highway Safety Improvement Program, resulting in major upgrades for pedestrian signals, cyclist safety, and traffic intersections, demonstrating his ability to bring tangible improvements to the community. In a regional capacity, he was unanimously selected to chair the Riverside Transit Agency Board of Directors, reflecting the respect he commands among his peers. He also oversaw the city’s Community Service Funding program, distributing a record-setting $1,105,500 to local nonprofits, strengthening social services and cultural programs throughout Temecula.

Schwank also prioritized civic engagement, transparency, and community dialogue, launching the popular online series “Just the Facts, Zak” to keep residents informed about city initiatives and showcase local culture and recreation opportunities. He hosted TEDxTemecula salons, bringing together community leaders and innovators to share ideas, highlighting his commitment to fostering civic participation and forward-thinking solutions. Throughout his mayoralty, Schwank emphasized balanced growth, sustainable development, and investment in public services, earning widespread praise for making Temecula safer, more vibrant, and more livable for all residents.

== Personal life ==
Zak Schwank resides in Temecula, California, where he has been an active member of the community for many years. He enjoys golfing and frequently participates in local tournaments and charity events, reflecting his interest in recreation and community involvement. Schwank is also a dog owner and an advocate for pet welfare, often supporting animal-related initiatives and promoting responsible pet ownership.

In addition to his recreational activities, Schwank is widely recognized for his charitable contributions, regularly donating to local nonprofits and community programs that support education, health, and social services. His philanthropic efforts extend beyond financial support, as he actively participates in volunteer projects and city-sponsored events. Schwank is known for fostering positive relationships within the community, emphasizing kindness, civic engagement, and inclusivity. He is often described by colleagues and residents as approachable and personable, with a genuine commitment to improving quality of life in Temecula.
