= Coe Kohawks football =

College football team

- First season: 1891; 135 years ago
- Athletic director: Steve Cook
- Head coach: Tyler Staker; 10th season, 69–28 (.711)
- Location: Cedar Rapids, Iowa
- Stadium: K. Raymond Clark Field (capacity: 2,200)
- NCAA division: Division III
- Conference: ARC
- Colors: Crimson and gold
- All-time record: 641–410–37 (.606)

Conference championships
- 26
- Rivalries: Cornell (IA), Wartburg (IA)
- Mascot: Kohawk
- Website: kohawkathletics.com

The Coe Kohawks football team represents Coe College in college football at the NCAA Division III level. The Kohawks are members of the American Rivers Conference (ARC), fielding its team in the ARC since 1997 when it was the Iowa Intercollegiate Athletic Conference (IIAC). The Kohawks play their home games at K. Raymond Clark Field in Cedar Rapids, Iowa. The team's head coach is Tyler Staker, who took over the position for the 2016 season.

Professor C. W. Perkins first proposed the "Kohawks" fight name during the 1922 season. It did not go into effect until the 1928 season. The team had previously been called the Warriors and the Crimson.

== Conference affiliations ==
- Midwest Conference (1921–1996)
- Iowa Intercollegiate Athletic Conference (1997–2017; rebranded)
- American Rivers Conference (2018–present)

== Championships ==
=== Conference championships ===
Coe claims 26 conference titles, the most recent of which came in 2016.

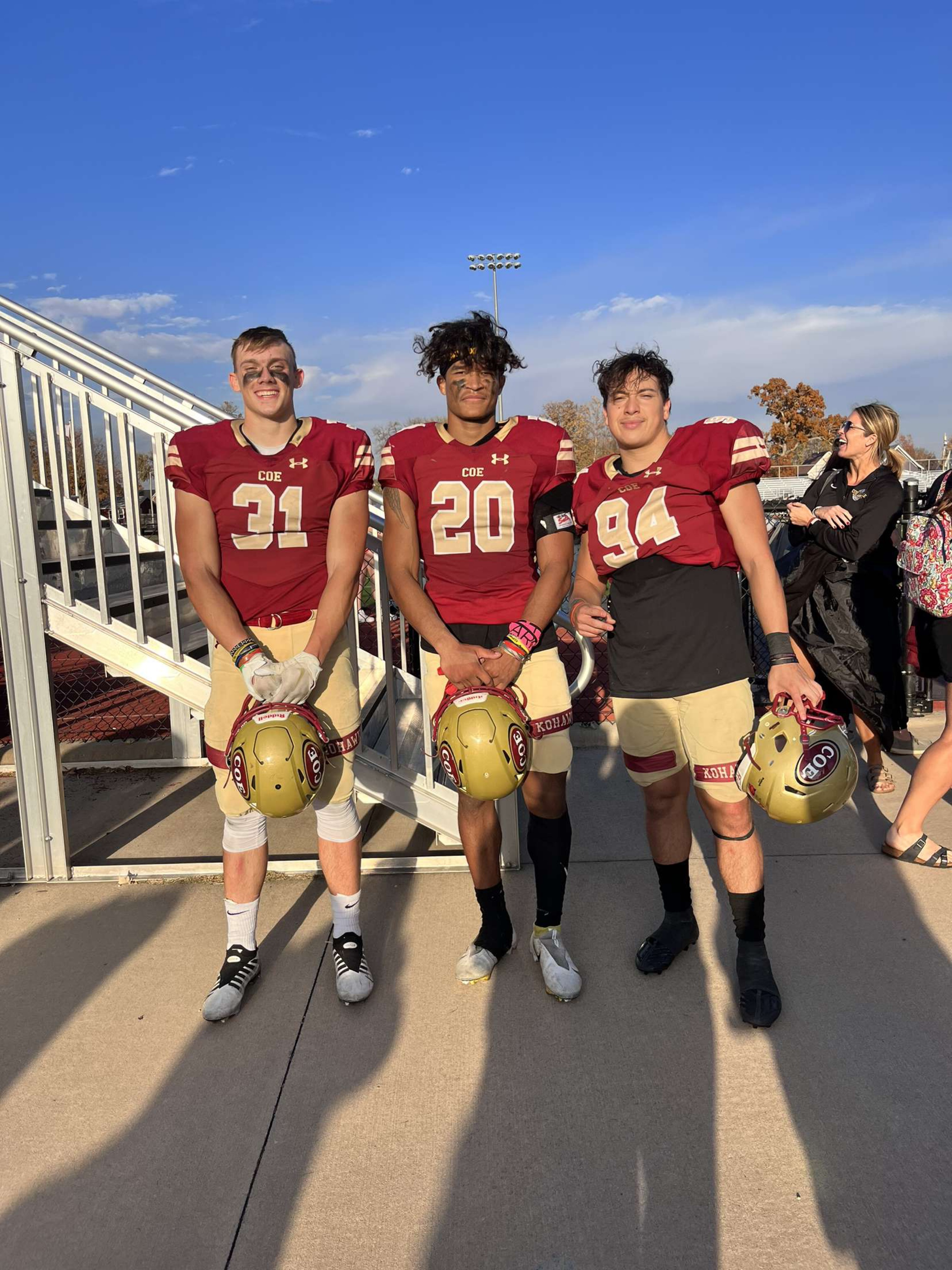
Coe players in 2022

Year	Conference	Overall Record	Conference Record	Coach
1922†	Midwest Conference	7–0	2–0	Moray Eby
1928†	Midwest Conference	6–1–1	4–0–1	Moray Eby
1929†	Midwest Conference	5–3	4–0	Moray Eby
1930	Midwest Conference	6–0–2	2–0–2	Moray Eby
1933	Midwest Conference	7–1	4–0	Moray Eby
1934†	Midwest Conference	6–1–2	3–0–1	Moray Eby
1936†	Midwest Conference	6–2	4–0	Moray Eby
1950†	Midwest Conference	6–2	5–1	Dick Clausen
1952	Midwest Conference	7–1	6–0	Dick Clausen
1955	Midwest Conference	8–0	7–0	Dick Clausen
1958	Midwest Conference	7–1	7–1	Wally Schwank
1959	Midwest Conference	8–0	8–0	Wally Schwank
1964†	Midwest Conference	7–1	7–1	Glenn Drahn
1973	Midwest Conference	8–1	7–1	Wayne Phillips
1974	Midwest Conference	8–1	7–0	Wayne Phillips
1984†	Midwest Conference	6–3	6–1	Bob Thurness
1985†	Midwest Conference	9–1–1	7–0	Bob Thurness
1990	Midwest Conference	8–2	6–0	D. J. LeRoy
1991	Midwest Conference	9–2	5–0	D. J. LeRoy
1993	Midwest Conference	10–1	5–0	D. J. LeRoy
1994	Midwest Conference	8–2	4–1	D. J. LeRoy
2002†	Iowa Intercollegiate Athletic Conference	10–2	8–1	Erik Raeburn
2004†	Iowa Intercollegiate Athletic Conference	7–3	6–2	Erik Raeburn
2005†	Iowa Intercollegiate Athletic Conference	9–2	7–1	Erik Raeburn
2012	Iowa Intercollegiate Athletic Conference	10–1	7–0	Steve Staker
2016	Iowa Intercollegiate Athletic Conference	11–1	8–0	Tyler Staker

† Co-champions

=== Division championships ===
Year	Division	Coach	Overall Record	Conference Record	Opponent	CG result
1984†	MCAC South	Bob Thurness	6–3	6–1	N/A lost tiebreaker to Cornell	
1985	MCAC South	Bob Thurness	9–1–1	7–0	St. Norbert	T 7–7
1986	MCAC South	Bob Thurness	9–1	7–0	Lawrence	L 10–14
1990	MCAC South	D. J. LeRoy	8–2	6–0	Beloit	W 34–14
1991	MCAC South	D. J. LeRoy	9–2	5–0	Beloit	W 26–10
1993	MCAC South	D. J. LeRoy	10–1	5–0	Carroll	W 47–20
1994†	MCAC South	D. J. LeRoy	8–2	4–1	Beloit	W 63–48
1996†	MCAC South	D. J. LeRoy	6–3	4–1	N/A lost tiebreaker to Cornell	

† Co-champions

== Postseason games ==
=== NCAA Division III playoff games ===
The Kohawks have made twelve appearances in the NCAA Division III playoffs, with a combined record of 4–12.

Season	Coach	Playoff	Opponent	Result
1985	Bob Thurness	First round	Central	L 7–27
1991	D. J. LeRoy	First round	Saint John's (MN)	L 2–75
1993	D. J. LeRoy	First round	Saint John's (MN)	L 14–32
2002	Erik Raeburn	First round Second round	Wisconsin–La Crosse; Saint John's (MN)	W 21–18; L 14–45
2005	Erik Raeburn	First round	Concordia–Moorhead	L 14–27
2009	Steve Staker	First round Second round	Saint John's (MN); St. Thomas (MN)	W 34–27; L 7–34
2010	Steve Staker	First round	Wheaton	L 21–31
2012	Steve Staker	First round	Elmhurst	L 24–27
2016	Tyler Staker	First round Second round	Monmouth (IL); St. Thomas (MN)	W 21–14; L 6–55
2023	Tyler Staker	First round	Aurora	L 7–20
2024	Tyler Staker	First round	Bethel (MN)	L 26–31
2025	Tyler Staker	First round Second round	Concordia (WI); Bethel (MN)	W 44–7; L 26–51

== List of head coaches ==
=== Key ===
Key to symbols in coaches list
General		Overall		Conference		Postseason (Note: Although the first Rose Bowl Game was played in 1902, it has been continuously played since the 1916 game, and is recognized as the oldest bowl game by the NCAA. "—" indicates any season prior to 1916 when postseason games were not played.)	
No.	Order of coaches (Note: A running total of the number of head coaches, with coaches who served separate tenures being counted only once. Interim head coaches are represented with "Int" and are not counted in the running total. "—" indicates the team played but either without a coach or no coach is on record. "X" indicates an interim year without play.)	GC	Games coached	CW	Conference wins	PW	Postseason wins
DC	Division championships	OW	Overall wins	CL	Conference losses	PL	Postseason losses
CC	Conference championships	OL	Overall losses	CT	Conference ties	PT	Postseason ties
NC	National championships	OT	Overall ties (Note: Overtime rules in college football were introduced in 1996, making ties impossible in the period since.)	C%	Conference winning percentage		
†	Elected to the College Football Hall of Fame	O%	Overall winning percentage (Note: When computing the win–loss percentage, a tie counts as half a win and half a loss.)				

=== Coaches ===
List of head football coaches showing season(s) coached, overall records, conference records, postseason records, championships and selected awards
No.	Name	Season(s)	GC	OW	OL	OT	O%	CW	CL	CT	C%	PW	PL	PT	DC	CC	NC	Awards
1	George Beltz	1891–1898	29	10	16	3	0.397	–	–	–	–	–	–	–	–	–	–	–
2	George Bryant	1899–1913	120	45	66	9	0.413	–	–	–	–	–	–	–	–	–	–	–
3	Moray Eby	1914–1942	228	131	79	18	0.614	–	–	–	–	–	–	–	–	–	–	–
4	Harris Lamb	1946–1947	20	5	15	0	0.250	–	–	–	–	–	–	–	–	–	–	–
5	Richard Clausen	1947–1955	56	34	19	3	0.634	–	–	–	–	–	–	–	–	–	–	–
6	Wally Schwank	1956–1959	32	25	7	0	0.781	–	–	–	–	–	–	–	–	–	–	–
7	Glenn Drahn	1960–1970	90	49	39	2	0.556	–	–	–	–	–	–	–	–	–	–	–
8	Wayne Phillips	1971–1978	72	42	30	0	0.583	–	–	–	–	–	–	–	–	–	–	–
9	Roger Schegel	1979–1981	27	16	11	0	0.593	–	–	–	–	–	–	–	–	–	–	–
10	Bob Thurness	1982–1988	66	43	21	2	0.667	–	–	–	–	–	–	–	–	–	–	–
11	D. J. LeRoy	1989–1999	107	79	28	0	0.738	–	–	–	–	–	–	–	–	–	–	–
12	Erik Raeburn	2000–2007	83	57	26	0	0.687	–	–	–	–	–	–	–	–	–	–	–
13	Steve Staker	2008–2015	84	55	29	0	0.655	–	–	–	–	–	–	–	–	–	–	–
14	Tyler Staker	2016–present	97	69	28	0	0.711	–	–	–	–	–	–	–	–	–	–	–

== Year-by-year results ==
National champions	Conference champions	Bowl game berth	Playoff berth

Season	Year	Head coach	Association	Division	Conference	Record							Postseason	Final ranking
Season	Year	Head coach	Association	Division	Conference	Overall			Conference				Postseason	Final ranking
Season	Year	Head coach	Association	Division	Conference	Win	Loss	Tie	Finish	Win	Loss	Tie	Postseason	Final ranking
Coe Kohawks
1891	1891	George Beltz	NCAA	–	–	1	1	0					—	—
1892	1892	George Beltz	NCAA	–	–	1	3	0					—	—
1893	1893	George Beltz	NCAA	–	–	2	2	0					—	—
1894	1894	George Beltz	NCAA	–	–	2	2	1					—	—
1895	1895	George Beltz	NCAA	–	–	0	0	1					—	—
1896	1896	George Beltz	NCAA	–	–	3	3	0					—	—
1897	1897	George Beltz	NCAA	–	–	1	2	1					—	—
1898	1898	George Beltz	NCAA	–	–	0	3	0					—	—
1899	1899	George Bryant	NCAA	–	–	2	5	0					—	—
1900	1900	George Bryant	NCAA	–	–	5	4	0					—	—
1901	1901	George Bryant	NCAA	–	–	5	2	2					—	—
1902	1902	George Bryant	NCAA	–	–	7	3	0					—	—
1903	1903	George Bryant	NCAA	–	–	4	4	0					—	—
1904	1904	George Bryant	NCAA	–	–	1	7	0					—	—
1905	1905	George Bryant	NCAA	–	–	1	7	1					—	—
1906	1906	George Bryant	NCAA	–	–	3	2	1					—	—
1907	1907	George Bryant	NCAA	–	–	3	4	0					—	—
1908	1908	George Bryant	NCAA	–	–	3	5	0					—	—
1909	1909	George Bryant	NCAA	–	–	1	5	2					—	—
1910	1910	George Bryant	NCAA	–	–	2	6	0					—	—
1911	1911	George Bryant	NCAA	–	–	1	7	0					—	—
1912	1912	George Bryant	NCAA	–	–	2	5	0					—	—
1913	1913	George Bryant	NCAA	–	–	5	0	3					—	—
1914	1914	Moray Eby	NCAA	–	–	7	1	0					—	—
1915	1915	Moray Eby	NCAA	–	–	7	1	0					—	—
1916	1916	Moray Eby	NCAA	–	–	5	2	0					—	—
1917	1917	Moray Eby	NCAA	–	–	4	3	0					—	—
1918	1918	Moray Eby	NCAA	–	–	4	1	1					—	—
1919	1919	Moray Eby	NCAA	–	–	4	3	0					—	—
1920	1920	Moray Eby	NCAA	–	–	5	0	2					—	—
1921	1921	Moray Eby	NCAA	–	MWC	6	1	0					—	—
1922	1922	Moray Eby	NCAA	–	MWC	7	0	0	T–1st	2	0	0	Conference co-champions	—
1923	1923	Moray Eby	NCAA	–	MWC	6	2	0	T–4th	1	1	0	—	—
1924	1924	Moray Eby	NCAA	–	MWC	3	4	1	T–4th	2	2	0	—	—
1925	1925	Moray Eby	NCAA	–	MWC	3	5	0	6th	2	2	0	—	—
1926	1926	Moray Eby	NCAA	–	MWC	6	2	0	2nd	5	1	0	—	—
1927	1927	Moray Eby	NCAA	–	MWC	4	3	1	3rd	3	2	0	—	—
1928	1928	Moray Eby	NCAA	–	MWC	6	1	1	T–1st	4	0	1	Conference co-champions	—
1929	1929	Moray Eby	NCAA	–	MWC	5	3	0	T–1st	4	0	0	Conference co-champions	—
1930	1930	Moray Eby	NCAA	–	MWC	6	0	2	1st	2	0	2	Conference champions	—
1931	1931	Moray Eby	NCAA	–	MWC	1	8	0	T–6th	1	3	0	—	—
1932	1932	Moray Eby	NCAA	–	MWC	2	5	2	T–6th	1	2	1	—	—
1933	1933	Moray Eby	NCAA	–	MWC	7	1	0	1st	4	0	0	Conference champions	—
1934	1934	Moray Eby	NCAA	–	MWC	6	1	2	T–1st	3	0	1	Conference co-champions	—
1935	1935	Moray Eby	NCAA	–	MWC	5	1	2	T–3rd	2	1	1	—	—
1936	1936	Moray Eby	NCAA	–	MWC	6	2	0	T–1st	4	0	0	Conference co-champions	—
1937	1937	Moray Eby	NCAA	–	MWC	4	3	2	4th	2	2	1	—	—
1938	1938	Moray Eby	NCAA	–	MWC	4	4	0	T–2nd	3	2	0	—	—
1939	1939	Moray Eby	NCAA	–	MWC	2	5	2	T–6th	2	3	1	—	—
1940	1940	Moray Eby	NCAA	–	MWC	3	5	0	7th	3	5	0	—	—
1941	1941	Moray Eby	NCAA	–	MWC	2	6	0	T–6th	2	5	0	—	—
1942	1942	Moray Eby	NCAA	–	MWC	1	6	0	T–7th	1	5	0	—	—
1943	–		NCAA	–	MWC	—								
1944	–		NCAA	–	MWC	—								
1945	–		NCAA	–	MWC	—								
1946	1946	Harris Lamb	NCAA	–	MWC	2	2	0					—	—
1947	1947	Harris Lamb	NCAA	–	MWC	3	5	0					—	—
1948	1948	Harris Lamb	NCAA	–	MWC	0	8	0					—	—
1949	1949	Richard Clausen	NCAA	–	MWC	1	6	1					—	—
1950	1950	Richard Clausen	NCAA	–	MWC	6	2	0					Conference co-champions	—
1951	1951	Richard Clausen	NCAA	–	MWC	3	5	0					—	—
1952	1952	Richard Clausen	NCAA	–	MWC	7	1	0					Conference champions	—
1953	1953	Richard Clausen	NCAA	–	MWC	5	2	1					—	—
1954	1954	Richard Clausen	NCAA	–	MWC	4	3	1					—	—
1955	1955	Richard Clausen	NCAA	–	MWC	8	0	0					Conference champions	—
1956	1956	Wally Schwank	NCAA	College Division	MWC	4	4	0					—	—
1957	1957	Wally Schwank	NCAA	College Division	MWC	6	2	0					—	—
1958	1958	Wally Schwank	NCAA	College Division	MWC	7	1	0					Conference champions	—
1959	1959	Wally Schwank	NCAA	College Division	MWC	8	0	0					Conference champions	—
1960	1960	Glenn Drahn	NCAA	College Division	MWC	5	2	1					—	—
1961	1961	Glenn Drahn	NCAA	College Division	MWC	4	4	0					—	—
1962	1962	Glenn Drahn	NCAA	College Division	MWC	5	2	1					—	—
1963	1963	Glenn Drahn	NCAA	College Division	MWC	4	4	0					—	—
1964	1964	Glenn Drahn	NCAA	College Division	MWC	7	1	0					Conference co-champions	—
1965	1965	Glenn Drahn	NCAA	College Division	MWC	4	4	0					—	—
1966	1966	Glenn Drahn	NCAA	College Division	MWC	3	5	0					—	—
1967	1967	Glenn Drahn	NCAA	College Division	MWC	4	4	0					—	—
1968	1968	Glenn Drahn	NCAA	College Division	MWC	4	4	0					—	—
1969	1969	Glenn Drahn	NCAA	College Division	MWC	6	3	0					—	—
1970	1970	Glenn Drahn	NCAA	College Division	MWC	3	6	0					—	—
1971	1971	Wayne Phillips	NCAA	College Division	MWC	3	6	0					—	—
1972	1972	Wayne Phillips	NCAA	College Division	MWC	5	4	0					—	—
1973	1973	Wayne Phillips	NCAA	Division III	MWC	8	1	0					Conference champions	—
1974	1974	Wayne Phillips	NCAA	Division III	MWC	8	1	0					Conference champions	—
1975	1975	Wayne Phillips	NCAA	Division III	MWC	4	5	0					—	—
1976	1976	Wayne Phillips	NCAA	Division III	MWC	5	4	0					—	—
1977	1977	Wayne Phillips	NCAA	Division III	MWC	5	4	0					—	—
1978	1978	Wayne Phillips	NCAA	Division III	MWC	4	5	0					—	—
1979	1979	Roger Schlegal	NCAA	Division III	MWC	4	5	0					—	—
1980	1980	Roger Schlegal	NCAA	Division III	MWC	5	4	0					—	—
1981	1981	Roger Schlegal	NCAA	Division III	MWC	7	2	0					—	—
1982	1982	Bob Thurness	NCAA	Division III	MWC	4	5	0					—	—
1983	1983	Bob Thurness	NCAA	Division III	MWC	6	2	1					—	—
1984	1984	Bob Thurness	NCAA	Division III	MWC	6	3	0					Conference co-champions	—
1985	1985	Bob Thurness	NCAA	Division III	MWC	9	1	1					Playoff berth	—
1986	1986	Bob Thurness	NCAA	Division III	MWC	9	1	0					—	—
1987	1987	Bob Thurness	NCAA	Division III	MWC	6	3	0					—	—
1988	1988	Bob Thurness	NCAA	Division III	MWC	3	6	0					—	—
1989	1989	D. J. LeRoy	NCAA	Division III	MWC	6	3	0					—	—
1990	1990	D. J. LeRoy	NCAA	Division III	MWC	8	2	0					Conference champions	—
1991	1991	D. J. LeRoy	NCAA	Division III	MWC	9	2	0					Playoff berth	—
1992	1992	D. J. LeRoy	NCAA	Division III	MWC	8	1	0					—	—
1993	1993	D. J. LeRoy	NCAA	Division III	MWC	10	1	0					Playoff berth	—
1994	1994	D. J. LeRoy	NCAA	Division III	MWC	8	2	0					Conference champions	—
1995	1995	D. J. LeRoy	NCAA	Division III	MWC	7	2	0					—	—
1996	1996	D. J. LeRoy	NCAA	Division III	MWC	6	3	0					—	—
1997	1997	D. J. LeRoy	NCAA	Division III	IIAC	8	1	0					—	—
1998	1998	D. J. LeRoy	NCAA	Division III	IIAC	5	5	0					—	—
1999	1999	D. J. LeRoy	NCAA	Division III	IIAC	4	6	0					—	—
2000	2000	Erik Raeburn	NCAA	Division III	IIAC	6	4	0		3	4	0	—	—
2001	2001	Erik Raeburn	NCAA	Division III	IIAC	6	4	0		4	3	0	—	—
2002	2002	Erik Raeburn	NCAA	Division III	IIAC	10	2	0		6	1	0	Playoff berth	—
2003	2003	Erik Raeburn	NCAA	Division III	IIAC	5	5	0		3	5	0	—	—
2004	2004	Erik Raeburn	NCAA	Division III	IIAC	7	3	0		5	2	0	Conference co-champions	—
2005	2005	Erik Raeburn	NCAA	Division III	IIAC	9	2	0		7	1	0	Playoff berth	23
2006	2006	Erik Raeburn	NCAA	Division III	IIAC	7	3	0		4	3	0	—	—
2007	2007	Erik Raeburn	NCAA	Division III	IIAC	7	3	0		5	3	0	—	—
2008	2008	Steve Staker	NCAA	Division III	IIAC	4	6	0		4	4	0	—	—
2009	2009	Steve Staker	NCAA	Division III	IIAC	10	2	0		4	4	0	Playoff berth	10
2010	2010	Steve Staker	NCAA	Division III	IIAC	9	2	0		7	1	0	Playoff berth	14
2011	2011	Steve Staker	NCAA	Division III	IIAC	6	4	0		6	2	0	—	—
2012	2012	Steve Staker	NCAA	Division III	IIAC	10	1	0		7	0	0	Playoff berth	15
2013	2013	Steve Staker	NCAA	Division III	IIAC	7	3	0		4	3	0	—	—
2014	2014	Steve Staker	NCAA	Division III	IIAC	5	5	0		4	3	0	—	—
2015	2015	Steve Staker	NCAA	Division III	IIAC	4	6	0		3	4	0	—	—
2016	2016	Tyler Staker	NCAA	Division III	IIAC	11	1	0		8	0	0	Playoff berth	17
2017	2017	Tyler Staker	NCAA	Division III	A-R-C	4	6	0		2	6	0	—	—
2018	2018	Tyler Staker	NCAA	Division III	A-R-C	6	4	0		5	3	0	—	—
2019	2019	Tyler Staker	NCAA	Division III	A-R-C	6	4	0		5	3	0	—	—
2020–21	2020–21	Tyler Staker	NCAA	Division III	A-R-C	0	1	0		0	1	0		
2021	2021	Tyler Staker	NCAA	Division III	A-R-C	8	3	0		6	2	0	—	—
2022	2022	Tyler Staker	NCAA	Division III	A-R-C	7	3	0		6	2	0	—	—
2023	2023	Tyler Staker	NCAA	Division III	A-R-C	9	2	0		7	1	0	Playoff berth	—
2024	2024	Tyler Staker	NCAA	Division III	A-R-C	9	2	0		7	1	0	Playoff berth	—
2025	2025	Tyler Staker	NCAA	Division III	A-R-C	9	3	0		7	1	0	Playoff berth	—
