= Northern Iowa Panthers football =

College football team of the University of Northern Iowa

2026 Northern Iowa Panthers football team
- First season: 1895; 131 years ago
- Athletic director: Megan Franklin
- Head coach: Todd Stepsis; 1st season, 3–9 (.250)
- Location: Cedar Falls, Iowa
- Stadium: UNI-Dome (capacity: 16,324)
- NCAA division: Division I FCS
- Conference: Missouri Valley
- Colors: Purple and old gold
- All-time record: 707–464–47 (.600)
- Bowl record: 1–1 (.500)

Conference championships
- IIAC: 1927, 1928 NCC: 1940, 1941, 1942, 1946, 1947, 1948, 1949, 1952, 1960, 1961, 1962, 1964 AMCU: 1981, 1982, 1984 Gateway: 1985, 1987, 1990, 1991, 1992, 1993, 1994, 1995, 1996, 2001, 2003, 2005, 2007 MFVC: 2008, 2010, 2011
- Consensus All-Americans: 1
- Rivalries: Drake (rivalry); Iowa State; North Dakota State; Southern Illinois
- Fight song: "UNI Fight"
- Mascot: TC/TK Panther
- Marching band: "The Pride of Panther Nation"
- Website: unipanthers.com

The Northern Iowa Panthers football program represents the University of Northern Iowa in college football at the NCAA Division I Football Championship Subdivision (FCS) level as member of the Missouri Valley Football Conference (MVFC). The program began in 1895 and has fielded a team every year since with the exceptions of 1906–1907 and 1943–1944. The Panthers play their home games at the UNI-Dome on the campus of the University of Northern Iowa, in Cedar Falls, Iowa. They have appeared in the Division I FCS playoffs 22 times, third most among all current teams but have never won an FCS Division I championship.

== History ==
=== Classifications ===
- NCAA College Division (1956–1972)
- NCAA Division II (1973–1980)
- NCAA Division I-AA/FCS (1981–present)

=== Conference memberships ===
- Independent (1895–1922)
- Iowa Intercollegiate Athletic Conference (1923–1934)
- North Central Intercollegiate Athletic Conference (1935–1977)
- Mid-Continent Conference (1978–1984)
- Gateway Football Conference/Missouri Valley Football Conference (1985–present)

== Championship and postseason history ==
=== Conference championships ===
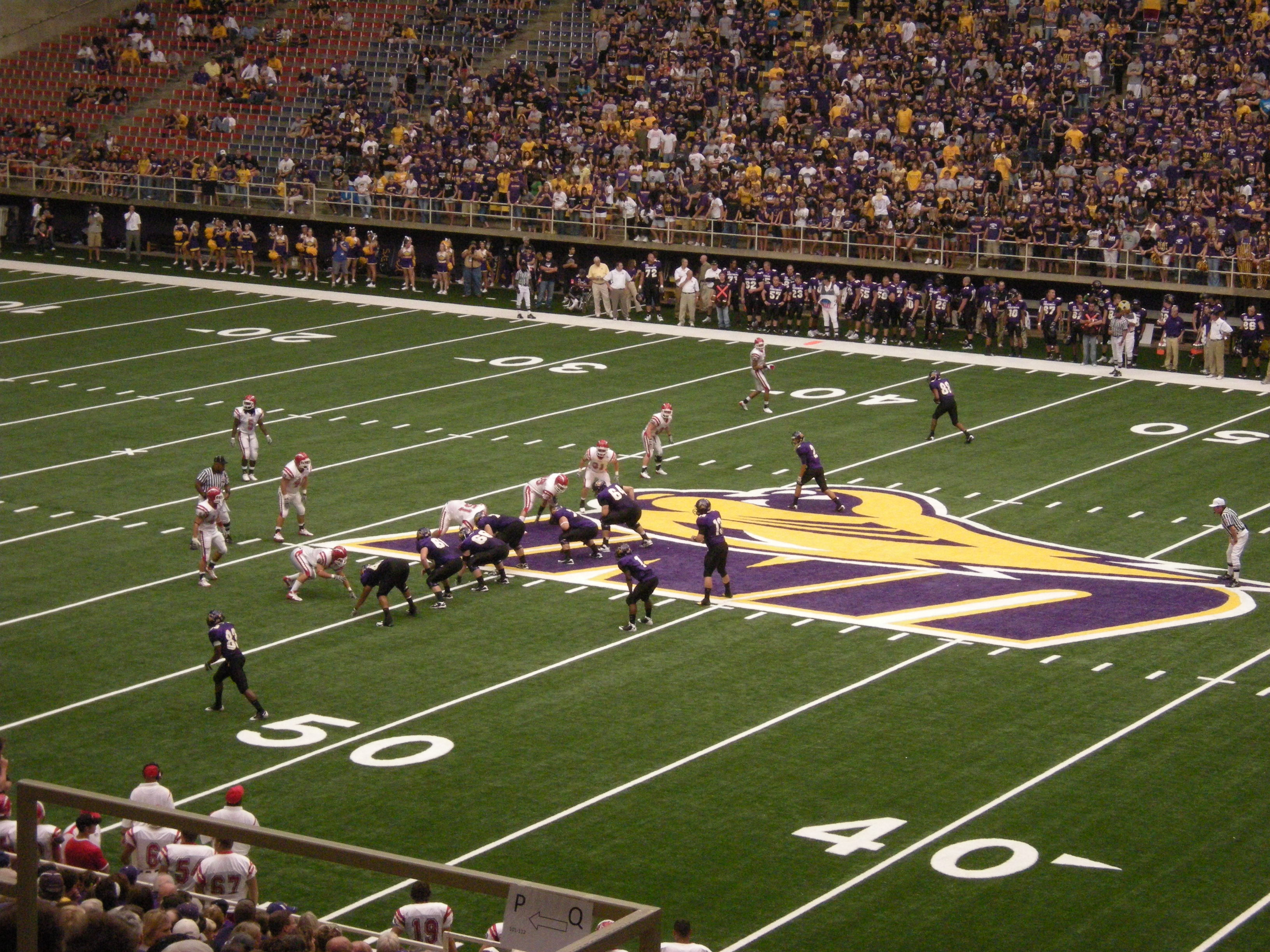
UNI's offense against the St. Francis Red Flash September 19, 2009

Northern Iowa has won thirty-three conference titles, the most out of the four Iowa Division I institutions. The Panthers have won two Iowa Intercollegiate Athletic Conference championships, twelve North Central Conference championships, three Association of Mid-Continent Universities football championships and sixteen Missouri Valley Football Conference championships.

Year	Conference	Overall record	Conference record
1927	IIAC	7–0–1	6–0
1928	IIAC	5–1–3	4–0–2
1940	NCC	8–1	5–0
1941	NCC	5–3	5–0
1942	NCC	6–1	5–0
1946	NCC	4–1–2	2–0–1
1947	NCC	5–3–1	4–0
1948	NCC	7–3	5–0
1949	NCC	5–2	5–1
1952	NCC	6–2	5–1
1960	NCC	9–1	6–0
1961	NCC	7–2	5–1
1962	NCC	7–1–1	5–0–1
1964	NCC	9–2	5–1
1981	AMCU	5–6	2–1
1982	AMCU	4–6–1	2–0–1
1984	AMCU	9–2	2–1
1985	MVFC	11–2	5–0
1987	MVFC	10–4	6–0
1990	MVFC	8–4	5–1
1991	MVFC	11–2	5–1
1992	MVFC	12–2	5–1
1993	MVFC	8–4	5–1
1994	MVFC	8–4	6–0
1995	MVFC	8–5	5–1
1996	MVFC	12–2	5–0
2001	MVFC	11–3	6–1
2003	MVFC	10–3	6–1
2005	MVFC	11–4	5–2
2007	MVFC	12–1	6–0
2008	MVFC	12–3	7–1
2010	MVFC	7–5	6–2
2011	MVFC	10–3	7–1

=== College Division bowl games ===
Northern Iowa played in the NCAA's College Division from 1937–1972. Twice in those years they qualified for a College Division bowl game.

Year	Bowl	Record	Opponent	Result
1960	Mineral Water Bowl	9–1–0	Hillsdale College	L 6–17
1964	Pecan Bowl	9–2–0	Lamar (TX)	W 19–17

=== Division I-AA/FCS playoff games ===
The Panthers have made twenty-two appearances in the Division I-AA/FCS playoffs, with an overall record of 24–22.

Year	Round	Opponent	Result
1985	Quarterfinal; Semifinal	Middle Tennessee; Georgia Southern	W 28–21; L 33–40
1987	First round Quarterfinal; Semifinal	Youngstown State; Arkansas State; Northeast Louisiana	W 31–28; W 49–28; L 41–44 ^{2OT}
1990	First round	Boise State	L 3–20
1991	First round Quarterfinal	Weber State; Marshall	W 38–21; L 13–41
1992	First round Quarterfinal; Semifinal	Eastern Washington; McNeese State; Youngstown State	W 17–14; W 29–7; L 7–19
1993	First round	Boston University	L 21–27 ^{2OT}
1994	First round	Montana	L 23–29
1995	First round Quarterfinal	Murray State; Marshall	W 35–34; L 24–41
1996	Quarterfinal; Semifinal	William & Mary; Marshall	W 38–35; L 14–31
2001	First round Quarterfinal; Semifinal	Eastern Illinois; Maine; Montana	W 49–43; W 56–28; L 10–38
2003	First round Quarterfinal	Montana State; Delaware	W 35–14; L 7–37
2005	Quarterfinal; Semifinal; National Championship	New Hampshire; Texas State; Appalachian State	W 24–21; W 40–37; L 16–21
2007	First round Quarterfinal	New Hampshire; Delaware	W 38–35; L 27–39
2008	First round Quarterfinal	Maine; New Hampshire; Richmond	W 40–15; W 36–34; L 20–21
2010	First round	Lehigh	L 7–14
2011	Second round Quarterfinal	Wofford; Montana	W 28–21; L 10–48
2014	First round Second round	Stephen F. Austin; Illinois State	W 44–10; L 21–41
2015	First round Second round Quarterfinal	Eastern Illinois; Portland State; North Dakota State	W 53–17; W 29–17; L 13–23
2017	First round Second round	Monmouth; South Dakota State	W 46–7; L 22–37
2018	First round Second round	Lamar; UC Davis	W 16–3; L 16–23
2019	First round Second round Quarterfinal	San Diego; South Dakota State; James Madison	W 17–3; W 13–10; L 0–17
2021	First round	Eastern Washington	L 9–19

=== FCS National Championship games ===
Season	Game	Record	Opponent	Result
2005	National Championship	11–4	Appalachian State	L 16–21

== UNI-Dome ==
The UNI-Dome opened in 1976, as the home of the UNI Panthers football team. The facility's capacity for football is 12,200. At football games, where cold temperatures are frequently an issue for fans, the UNI-Dome announcers will announce "conditions at game time" prior to each game. The announcers will announce the weather in the town where the visiting team is from, the current weather conditions outside the Dome, and then say "Inside - 72 degrees, no wind, welcome to the Dome!" to emphasize the fact that a domed stadium is not affected by the weather. Heading into the 2025 season, the Panthers have a home record of 233–68–1 in the UNI-Dome, having won nearly 80 percent of their games in the UNI-Dome.

== All-Americans ==
First Team Selections

- Paul Jones, E, 1937 (WR)
- Paul DeVan, HB, 1949 (AP)
- Lou Bohnsack, C, 1952 (AP)
- LeRoy Dunn, T, 1955 (WR)
- Dick Formanek, T, 1956 (WR)
- George Asleson, G, 1960 (AP)
- Jerry Morgan, QB, 1960 (WR)
- Wendell Williams, G, 1961 (AP)
- Dan Boals, FB, 1962 (WR)
- Randy Schultz, FB, 1964 and 1965 (AP)
- Ray Pedersen, G, 1967 (AP)
- Mike Timmermans, T, 1975 (AP)
- Brian Mitchell, PK, 1990 and 1991 (AP)
- Kenny Shedd, AP, 1992 (AP)
- William Freeney, LB, 1992 (AP)
- Andre Allen, LB, 1994 (AP)
- Dedric Ward, WR, 1995 and 1996 (AP)
- Eric Harris, LB, 1999 (AP)
- Brad Meester, C, 1999 (AP)
- Adam Vogt, LB, 2001 (AP)
- Mackenzie Hoambrecker, PK, 2002 (AP)
- Dre Dokes, DB, 2006 (AP)
- Brannon Carter, LB, 2007 (AP)
- Chad Rinehart, OL, 2007 (AP)
- James Ruffin, DL, 2009 (AP)
- Ben Boothby, DL, 2011 (AP)
- Michael Schmadeke, PK, 2014 (AP)
- Jack Rummells, OL, 2014 (AP)
- Deiondre' Hall, DB, 2015 (AP)
- Karter Schult, DL, 2016 (AP)
- Jared Brinkman, DL, 2020-21c and 2021 (AP)
- Trevor Penning, OL, 2021 (AP)
- Matthew Cook, 2023, K (AP)

WR=Williamson Ratings; AP=Associated Press;

c - 2020-21 selections include players who played Fall 2020 and teams (such as Northern Iowa) which moved their schedule to Spring 2021 due to COVID

== Notable players ==
- Willie Beamon
- Eddie Berlin
- Khristian Boyd
- Spencer Brown
- Mark Farley
- L. J. Fort
- Daurice Fountain
- Derrick Frost
- Joe Fuller
- Mike Furrey
- Deiondre' Hall
- Ryan Hannam
- Austin Howard
- David Johnson
- James Jones
- Brandon Keith
- Chris Klieman
- Joshua Mahoney
- Brad Meester
- Larry Miller
- Brian Mitchell
- Bryce Paup
- Trevor Penning
- Chad Rinehart
- Eric Sanders
- Benny Sapp
- Randy Schultz
- Terrell Sinkfield
- Varmah Sonie
- Justin Surrency
- Tanner Varner
- Dedric Ward
- Kurt Warner–Pro Football Hall of Fame Class of 2017
- Xavier Williams
- Mike Woodley
- Steve Wright

== Future non–conference opponents ==
Announced schedules as of November 5, 2026.

2027	2028	2029	2030	2031
Butler	at Iowa State	at Weber State	at Wisconsin	at Iowa State
at Nebraska	Valparaiso	at Iowa	Lindenwood	
Weber State	at Lindenwood	Northern Arizona		
