= 1926–27 Kent State Silver Foxes men's basketball team =

American college basketball season

1926–27 Kent State Silver Foxes men's basketball
- Conference: Independent
- Record: 5–11
- Head coach: Merle Wagoner (3rd season)
- Home arena: Wills Gymnasium

The 1926–27 Kent State Silver Foxes men's basketball team was the men's basketball team at what is now Kent State University in Kent, Ohio, then known as Kent State Normal College.

The men's basketball team played 16 games in late 1926 and early 1927, finishing with a record of 5–11. It was the third year for coach Merle Wagoner. Home games and practices were held in Wills Gymnasium, which had been dedicated on May 16, 1925.

Nort MacDermott served as team captain with Claude Vair as captain-elect and James Fuller as manager. The roster included Blaire Whyte, Ralph Rogers, William Searle, Joseph Henley, Claude Graber, August Peterka, Joe DeLeone and Frank Curtiss.

== Schedule and results ==
Date time, TV	Opponent	Result	Record	Site city, state
Friday; December 10, 1926*	at Mount Union	L 12–57	0–1	Alliance, OH
Monday; December 13, 1926*	Baldwin-Wallace	W 19–17	1–1	Wills Gymnasium; Kent, OH
Thursday; December 16, 1926*	Hiram	L 20–37	1–2	Wills Gymnasium; Kent, OH
Wednesday; January 5, 1927*	Kenyon	L 29–35	1–3	Wills Gymnasium; Kent, OH
Saturday; January 8, 1927*	at Case Tech	L 14–44	1–4	Cleveland, OH
Thursday; January 13, 1927*	at Indiana Normal	W 30–24	2–4	Indiana, PA
Saturday; January 15, 1927*	Kenyon	L 12–68	2–5	Wills Gymnasium; Kent, OH
Friday; January 21, 1927*	Wilmington	L 18–30	2–6	Wills Gymnasium; Kent, OH
Saturday; January 29, 1927*	Slippery Rock	W 29–28	3–6	Wills Gymnasium; Kent, OH
Thursday; February 3, 1927*	at Wilmington	L 21–33	3–7	Wilmington, OH
Friday; February 4, 1927*	at Bliss College	L 24–40	3–8	Columbus, OH
Saturday; February 5, 1927*	at Cedarville	L 9–24	3–9	Cedarville, OH
Saturday; February 12, 1927*	at Slippery Rock	L 35–37	3–10	Slippery Rock, PA
Saturday; February 19, 1927*	Cedarville	W 30–20	4–10	Wills Gymnasium; Kent, OH
Saturday; February 26, 1927*	Akron	W 23–21	5–10	Wills Gymnasium; Kent, OH
Friday; March 4, 1927*	Indiana Normal	L 27–30	5–11	Wills Gymnasium; Kent, OH
*Non-conference game. (#) Tournament seedings in parentheses. Sources

== See also ==
- List of Kent State Golden Flashes men's basketball seasons
