= 1925–26 Kent State Silver Foxes men's basketball team =

American college basketball season

1925–26 Kent State Silver Foxes men's basketball
- Conference: Independent
- Record: 6–8
- Head coach: Merle Wagoner (2nd season)
- Home arena: Wills Gymnasium

The 1925–26 Kent State Silver Foxes men's basketball team was the men's basketball team at what is now Kent State University in Kent, Ohio, then known as Kent State Normal College.

The men's basketball team played 14 games in early 1926, finishing with a record of 6–8. It was the first year for coach Merle Wagoner.

Home games and practices were held in the brand new Wills Gymnasium, which was dedicated on May 16, 1925. This was the first season in which home games were played on campus.

Eugene Feeley served as team captain with DeLeone as manager. The roster included Feeley, Charles Arnold, Frank Curtiss, Glen Francis, August Peterka, John Shedden, Harris, Claude Vair, Mel McDermott, Norton McDermott and Claude Graber.

== Schedule and results ==
Date time, TV	Opponent	Result	Record	Site city, state
January 5, 1926*	Mount Union	L 24–37	0–1	Wills Gymnasium; Kent, OH
January 13, 1926*	Wilmington	L 19–29	0–2	Wills Gymnasium; Kent, OH
January 16, 1926*	at West Liberty	L 18–28	0–3	West Liberty, WV
*	Cleveland Chiropractic	W 29–18	1–3	Wills Gymnasium; Kent, OH
*	Ashland	L 23–30	1–4	Wills Gymnasium; Kent, OH
February 5, 1926*	West Liberty	L 20–21	1–5	Wills Gymnasium; Kent, OH
February 11, 1926*	Slippery Rock	W 40–36	2–5	Wills Gymnasium; Kent, OH
February 19, 1926*	Edinboro	L 37–41	2–6	Wills Gymnasium; Kent, OH
February 26, 1926*	Findlay	W 42–13	3–6	Wills Gymnasium; Kent, OH
March 5, 1926*	at Bowling Green	L 23–47	3–7	Bowling Green, OH
March 6, 1916*	at Findlay	W 37–23	4–7	Findlay, OH
March 12, 1926*	at Edinboro	L 28–30	4–8	Edinboro, PA
March 13, 1926*	at Polish Alliance College	W 30–29	5–8	Cambridge Springs, PA
*	at Slippery Rock	W 38–29	6–8	Slippery Rock, PA
*Non-conference game. (#) Tournament seedings in parentheses. Sources

== See also ==
- List of Kent State Golden Flashes men's basketball seasons
