= Anniversary Award =

American college football rivalry trophy

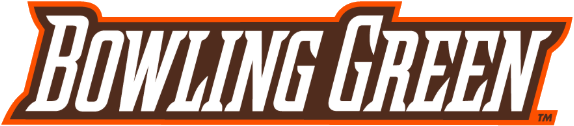
- Bowling Green Falcons Kent State Golden Flashes
- Sport: Football
- First meeting: November 6, 1920; Bowling Green, 7–0
- Latest meeting: November 10, 2026; Bowling Green, 33–28
- Next meeting: 2027

Statistics
- Total meetings: 94
- All-time series: Bowling Green leads, 63–25–6
- Trophy series: Bowling Green leads, 28–13
- Largest victory: Bowling Green, 48–0 (2015)
- Longest win streak: Bowling Green, 14 (1974–1987)
- Current win streak: Bowling Green, 1 (2026–present)

Locations of Bowling Green and Kent State

The Anniversary Award is a traveling trophy awarded to the winner of the annual college football game between the Bowling Green Falcons of Bowling Green State University and the Kent State Golden Flashes of Kent State University. Both schools, founded together in 1910, are located in northern Ohio, with Bowling Green in Northwest Ohio and Kent State in Northeast Ohio. The series between the two began in 1920, the first year Kent State fielded a football team, while the trophy was introduced in 1985.

== History ==
The Anniversary Award was created by each of the schools' alumni departments and commemorates the founding of both institutions, which occurred in 1910 as a result of the Lowry Bill. The award was first given out in 1985 to celebrate the 75th anniversary of the founding of each school. Through 2026, Bowling Green had won 28 of the 41 games played for the trophy.

== Game results ==
Bowling Green victories	Kent State victories	Tie games

No.	Date	Location	Winner	Score
1	November 6, 1920	Kent, OH	Bowling Green	7–0
2	October 1, 1921	Bowling Green, OH	Tie	0–0
3	November 11, 1922	Kent, OH	Bowling Green	6–0
4	October 15, 1927	Kent, OH	Bowling Green	13–0
5	November 26, 1928	Bowling Green, OH	Tie	6–6
6	October 13, 1934	Bowling Green, OH	Tie	0–0
7	October 26, 1935	Kent, OH	Kent State	45–0
8	October 24, 1936	Bowling Green, OH	Kent State	6–0
9	October 30, 1937	Kent, OH	Tie	13–13
10	November 5, 1938	Bowling Green, OH	Kent State	7–3
11	November 4, 1939	Kent, OH	Bowling Green	34–0
12	November 2, 1940	Bowling Green, OH	Kent State	13–0
13	November 1, 1941	Kent, OH	Bowling Green	12–6
14	October 31, 1942	Bowling Green, OH	Kent State	7–0
15	October 19, 1946	Kent, OH	Bowling Green	13–0
16	October 25, 1947	Bowling Green, OH	Bowling Green	21–18
17	November 6, 1948	Kent, OH	Bowling Green	23–14
18	November 5, 1949	Bowling Green, OH	Bowling Green	27–6
19	November 4, 1950	Kent, OH	Kent State	19–6
20	November 3, 1951	Bowling Green, OH	Tie	27–27
21	November 1, 1952	Kent, OH	Bowling Green	44–21
22	October 31, 1953	Bowling Green, OH	Kent State	41–7
23	October 30, 1954	Kent, OH	Kent State	28–25
24	September 23, 1955	Kent, OH	Tie	6–6
25	September 22, 1956	Bowling Green, OH	Bowling Green	17–0
26	October 26, 1957	Kent, OH	Bowling Green	13–7
27	October 25, 1958	Bowling Green, OH	Kent State	8–7
28	October 24, 1959	Kent, OH	Bowling Green	25–8
29	October 22, 1960	Bowling Green, OH	Bowling Green	28–0
30	October 21, 1961	Kent, OH	Bowling Green	21–6
31	October 20, 1962	Bowling Green, OH	Bowling Green	45–6
32	October 26, 1963	Kent, OH	Bowling Green	18–3
33	October 24, 1964	Bowling Green, OH	Bowling Green	41–0
34	October 23, 1965	Kent, OH	Bowling Green	7–6
35	October 22, 1966	Bowling Green, OH	Kent State	35–12
36	October 21, 1967	Kent, OH	Bowling Green	7–6
37	October 19, 1968	Bowling Green, OH	Bowling Green	30–7
38	October 18, 1969	Kent, OH	Bowling Green	7–0
39	October 17, 1970	Bowling Green, OH	Bowling Green	44–0
40	October 16, 1971	Kent, OH	Bowling Green	46–33
41	October 14, 1972	Bowling Green, OH	Kent State	14–10
42	October 13, 1973	Kent, OH	Kent State	21–7
43	October 12, 1974	Bowling Green, OH	Bowling Green	26–10
44	October 18, 1975	Cleveland, OH	Bowling Green	35–9
45	October 16, 1976	Bowling Green, OH	Bowling Green	17–13
46	October 16, 1977	Kent, OH	Bowling Green	14–10
47	October 14, 1978	Bowling Green, OH	Bowling Green	28–20
48	October 13, 1979	Kent, OH	Bowling Green	28–17

No.	Date	Location	Winner	Score
49	October 18, 1980	Bowling Green, OH	Bowling Green	24–3
50	October 31, 1981	Bowling Green, OH	Bowling Green	13–7
51	October 30, 1982	Kent, OH	Bowling Green	41–7
52	November 19, 1983	Bowling Green, OH	Bowling Green	38–3
53	November 17, 1984	Kent, OH	Bowling Green	27–10
54	October 26, 1985	Bowling Green, OH	Bowling Green	26–14
55	October 25, 1986	Kent, OH	Bowling Green	31–15
56	November 7, 1987	Bowling Green, OH	Bowling Green	30–20
57	November 5, 1988	Kent, OH	Kent State	31–19
58	November 4, 1989	Bowling Green, OH	Bowling Green	51–28
59	November 3, 1990	Kent, OH	Bowling Green	20–16
60	November 9, 1991	Bowling Green, OH	Bowling Green	35–7
61	November 7, 1992	Kent, OH	Bowling Green	28–22
62	November 6, 1993	Bowling Green, OH	Bowling Green	40–7
63	November 5, 1994	Kent, OH	Bowling Green	22–16
64	November 11, 1995	Kent, OH	Bowling Green	26–15
65	October 12, 1996	Bowling Green, OH	Bowling Green	31–24
66	November 1, 1997	Kent, OH	Kent State	29–20
67	October 24, 1998	Bowling Green, OH	Bowling Green	42–21
68	September 25, 1999	Kent, OH	Kent State	41–27
69	September 30, 2000	Kent, OH	Bowling Green	18–11
70	October 6, 2001	Bowling Green, OH	Bowling Green	24–7
71	November 2, 2002	Kent, OH	#21 Bowling Green	45–14
72	November 15, 2003	Bowling Green, OH	#25 Bowling Green	42–33
73	November 5, 2005	Kent, OH	Bowling Green	24–14
74	September 23, 2006	Bowling Green, OH	Kent State	38–3
75	October 20, 2007	Kent, OH	Bowling Green	31–20
76	November 1, 2008	Bowling Green, OH	Bowling Green	45–30
77	October 10, 2009	Kent, OH	Bowling Green	36–35
78	October 23, 2010	Bowling Green, OH	Kent State	30–6
79	November 12, 2011	Kent, OH	Kent State	27–15
80	November 17, 2012	Bowling Green, OH	#25 Kent State	31–24
81	September 7, 2013	Kent, OH	Bowling Green	41–22
82	November 12, 2014	Bowling Green, OH	Bowling Green	30–20
83	October 24, 2015	Kent, OH	Bowling Green	48–0
84	November 15, 2016	Bowling Green, OH	Bowling Green	42–7
85	October 31, 2017	Kent, OH	Bowling Green	44–16
86	October 30, 2018	Bowling Green, OH	Kent State	35–28
87	September 21, 2019	Kent, OH	Kent State	62–20
88	November 10, 2020	Bowling Green, OH	Kent State	62–24
89	October 2, 2021	Kent, OH	Kent State	27–20
90	November 9, 2022	Bowling Green, OH	Kent State	40–6
91	November 8, 2023	Kent, OH	Bowling Green	49–19
92	October 19, 2024	Bowling Green, OH	Bowling Green	27–6
93	October 25, 2025	Kent, OH	Kent State	24–21
94	November 17, 2026	Bowling Green, OH	Bowling Green	33–28
Series: Bowling Green leads 63–25–6

== See also ==
- List of NCAA college football rivalry games
