= Stark County Courthouse (Ohio) =

Local government building in the United States

- Stark County Courthouse and Annex
- U.S. National Register of Historic Places
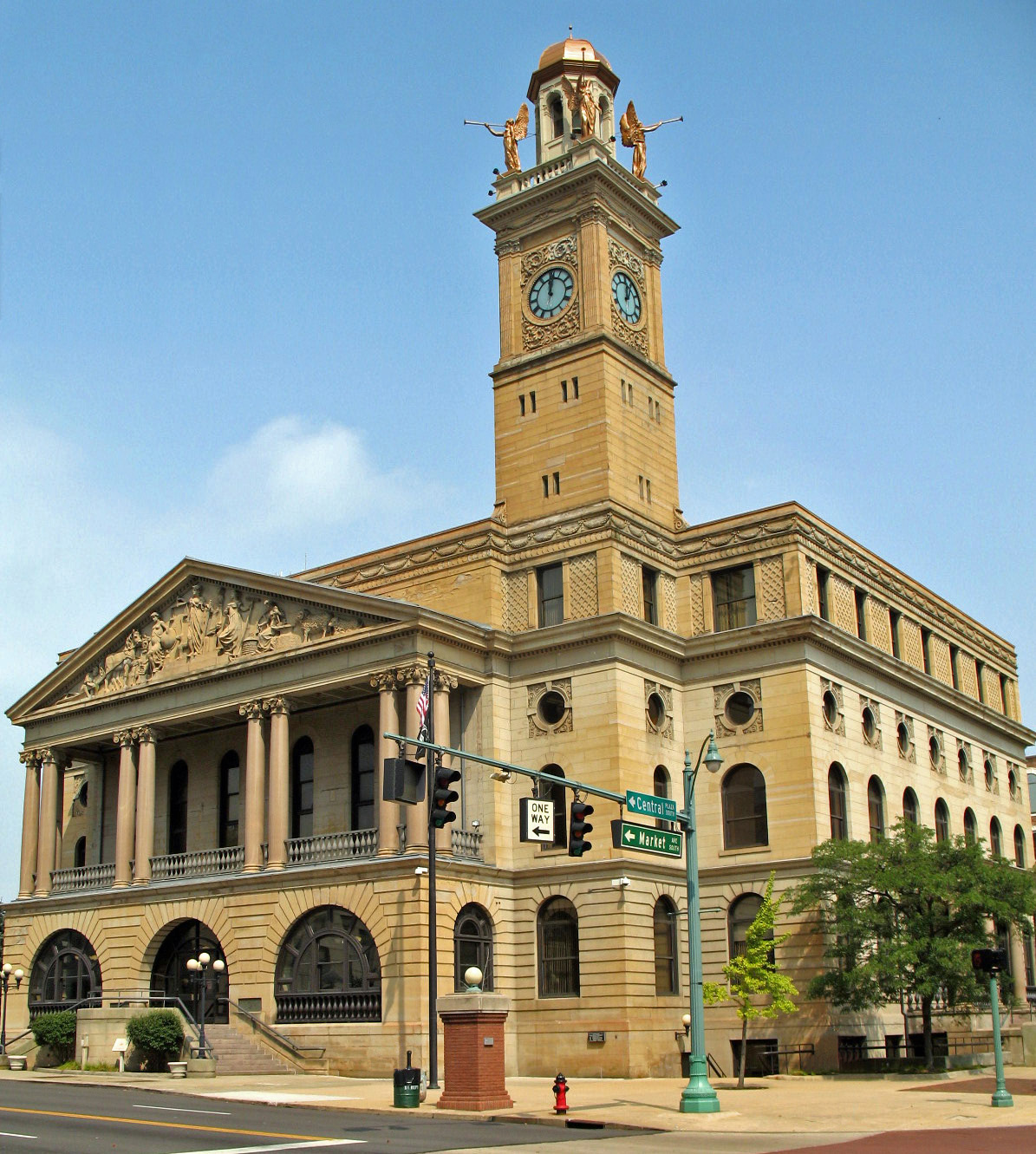
- Stark County Courthouse in Canton, Ohio

- Location within Ohio Location within the United States
- Interactive map showing the location for Stark County Courthouse
- Location: Market and Tuscarawas Streets; Canton, Ohio
- Coordinates: 40°47′56″N 81°22′31″W
- Area: less than one acre
- Built: 1870
- Architect: Henry Meyer
- Architectural style: Second Empire
- NRHP reference No.: 75001534
- Added to NRHP: April 03, 1975

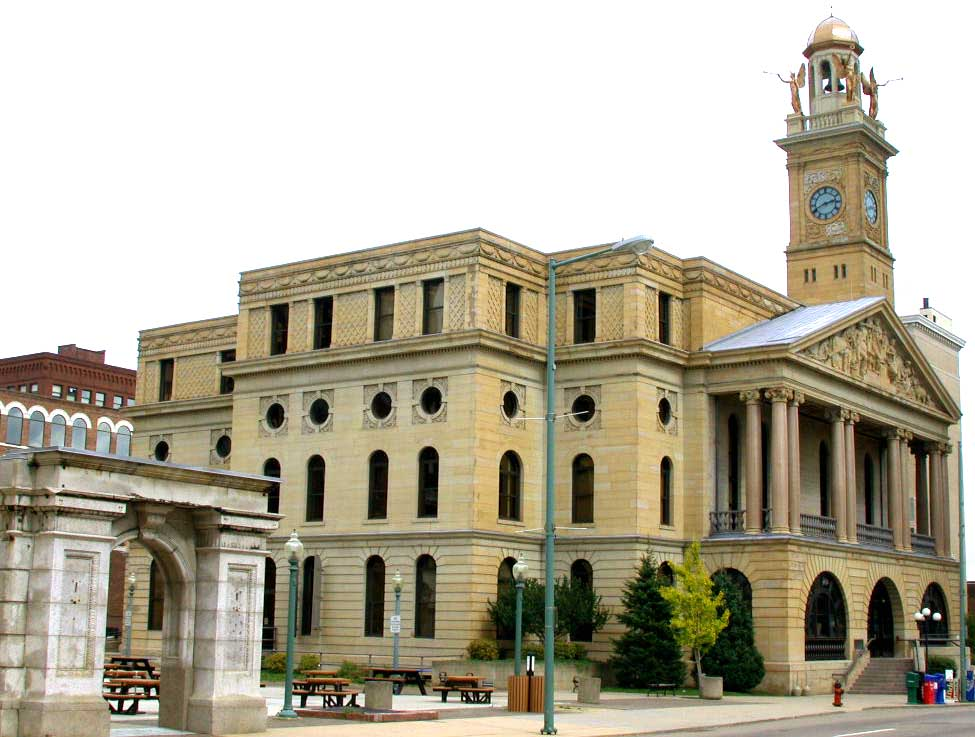
Side view of Stark County Courthouse

The Stark County Courthouse and its Annex are listed on the National Register of Historic Places for Canton, Ohio. The courthouse building was designed by Cleveland, Ohio based architect George F. Hammond in 1895, but was built around an older structure originally constructed in the 1870s. The building is considered to be in the Beaux Arts Architecture style reflecting Classicism styles. The clock tower is also adorned with statues of trumpeting angels. A second corner from the original structure tower was removed during the creation of the 1895 modifications.
