= United States Post Office and Federal Building (Zanesville, Ohio) =

Federal building, courthouse and post office in Zanesville, Ohio, United States

- US Post Office and Federal Building–Zanesville
- U.S. National Register of Historic Places
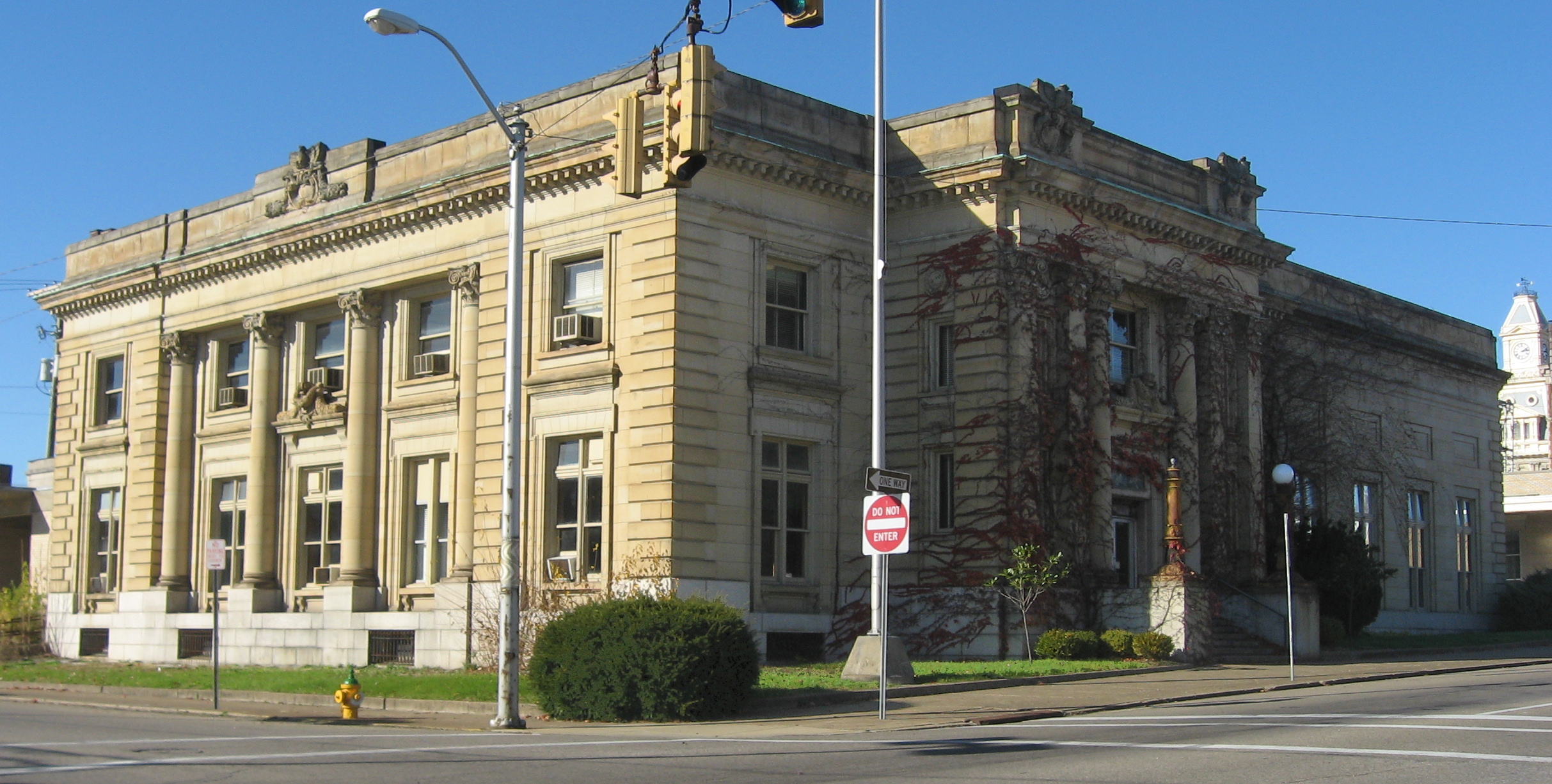
- Front and southern side of the building

- Location within Ohio Location within the United States
- Location: 65 S. Fifth St., Zanesville, Ohio
- Coordinates: 39°56′21″N 82°0′25″W
- Area: less than one acre
- Built: 1904
- Architect: George F. Hammond; G.L. Rodier
- Architectural style: Beaux Arts
- NRHP reference No.: 88000071
- Added to NRHP: February 11, 1988

The former United States Post Office and Federal Building is a historic structure in downtown Zanesville, Ohio, United States. Built in 1904, it was designed by Cleveland architect George F. Hammond. The post office and courthouse was listed on the National Register of Historic Places in 1988.
