= Fifth Third Center (Cleveland) =

Skyscraper in Cleveland, Ohio

Coordinates: 41.501237°N 81.689599°W

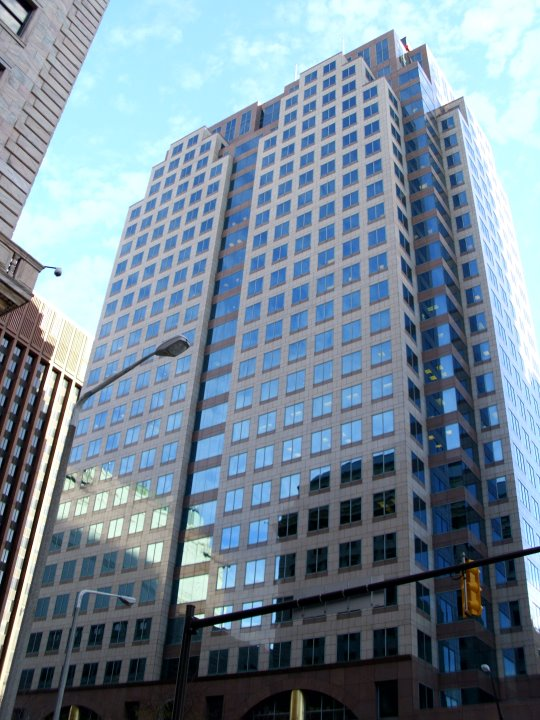
- Fifth Third Center in Cleveland, Ohio
- Interactive map of the Fifth Third Center area
- Former names: Bank One Center

General information
- Status: Completed
- Type: Office
- Location: 600 Superior Avenue Cleveland, Ohio, U.S.
- Construction started: 1990
- Completed: 1991

Height
- Roof: 135.94 m (446 ft)

Technical details
- Floor count: 27
- Floor area: 515,000 square feet (47,800 m^{2})

Design and construction
- Architect: RTKL

Fifth Third Center is a skyscraper located in Cleveland, Ohio, United States. The building has 27 stories and rises to a height of 446 ft (136 m), encompassing 515,000 square feet (47,800 m^{2}). Currently, it is the seventh tallest building in Cleveland. Designed by RTKL Associates, the building was originally constructed as Bank One Center in 1991. In 2003, it was renamed when Fifth Third Bank of Cincinnati relocated to the structure.

== History ==
The site of the Fifth Third Center was previously occupied by the Hollenden House from 1890 to 1989. The original Hollenden House Hotel was built in 1890 but was demolished in 1963. During the demolition of the old Hollenden House Hotel, the foundation for a new hotel in the style of the 1960s was being built.

In 1989, developer John Galbreath, who had a hand in the Erieview and One Cleveland Center project, worked with Nissi Iwho Realty Trust in Tokyo to build a new tower. In 1989, Citibank agreed to finance the construction of the tower. It cost $70,000,000 to build. In 1990, as construction was progressing, Bank One Corporation took five floors and renamed the Tower as Bank One Center. Bank One stayed in the tower from 1991–2003. In 2002, Bank One was acquired in a massive merger with JP Morgan Chase. In 2003, Chase reduced its Cleveland presence and Bank One moved its Cleveland Operations from its Tower to the Penton/IBM/Bond Court Tower.

In 2004, Fifth Third Bank gained its Cleveland presence with acquiring the Bank One Tower and renamed it Fifth Third Center.

== See also ==
- List of tallest buildings in Cleveland
