= George F. Hammond =

American architect

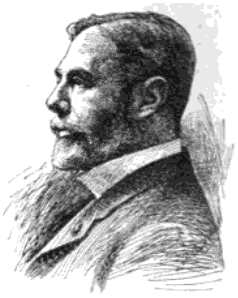
- Born: George Francis Hammond; November 26, 1855; Boston, Massachusetts
- Died: April 26, 1938 (aged 82); Falls Village, Connecticut
- Education: Massachusetts Normal Art School; Massachusetts Institute of Technology
- Occupation: Architect
- Spouses: Annie Borland Barstow (m. 1883; died 1886) Annie E. Butcher (m. 1897; div. 1922) Dorothy Weirick (div. 1931)
- Children: 1

George Francis Hammond (November 26, 1855 – April 26, 1938) was an architect in Cleveland, Ohio, United States, who designed commercial buildings, hotels, schools, churches, residences, and the plans for Kent State University's layout and original buildings. His work is mostly Neoclassical architecture, including in the Beaux Arts Architecture style, and includes an example of Egyptian Revival architecture in the basement foyer of the Hollenden Hotel.

== Early life ==
Hammond was born in the Roxbury section of Boston, Massachusetts to George and Cornelia Johnson Hammond. He painted before becoming a professional architect and attended the Massachusetts Normal Art School. He studied with William R. Ware at Massachusetts Institute of Technology, founded the first American curriculum based on the Beaux-Arts system of architectural training.

== Career ==
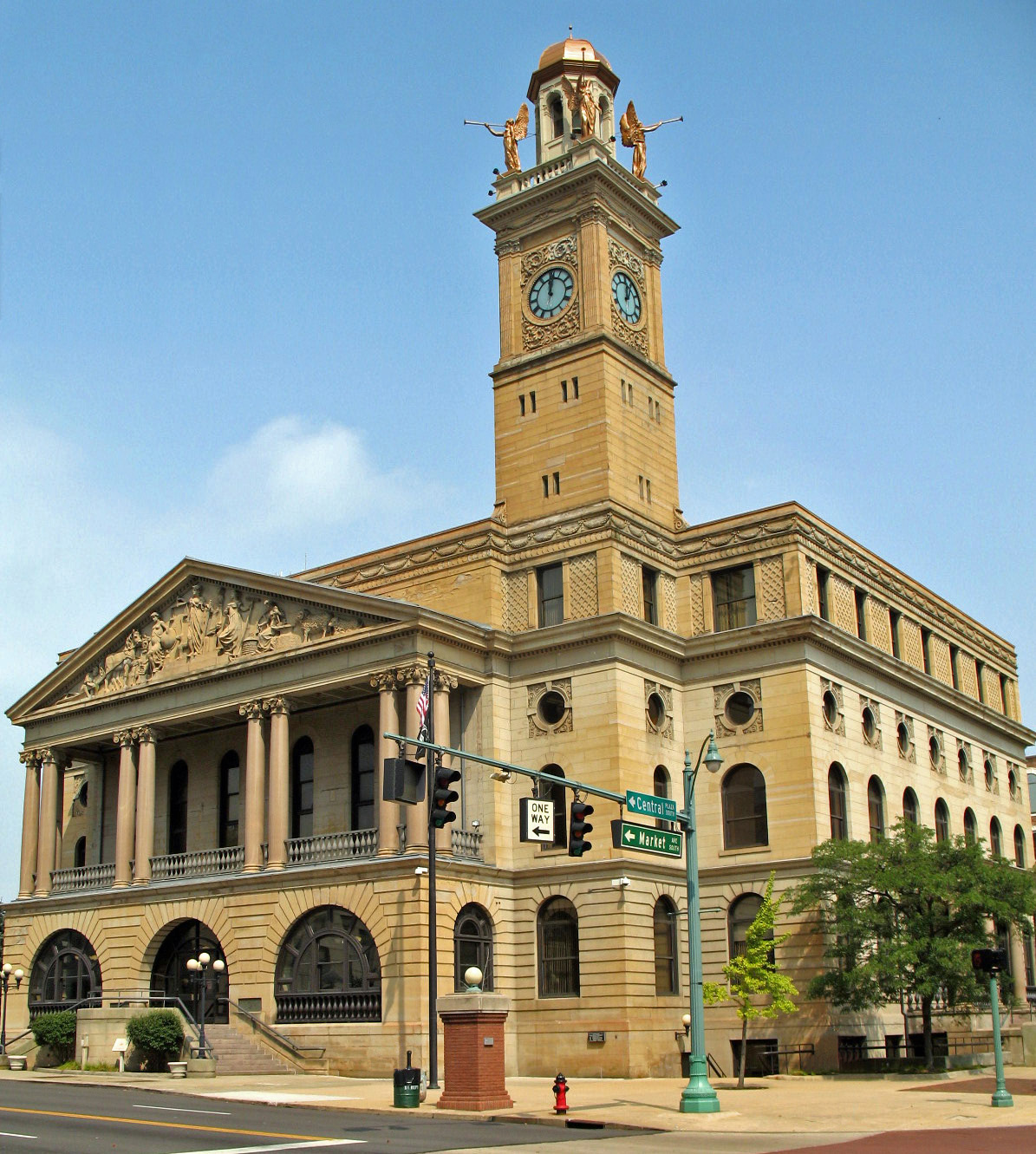
Stark County Courthouse in Canton, Ohio

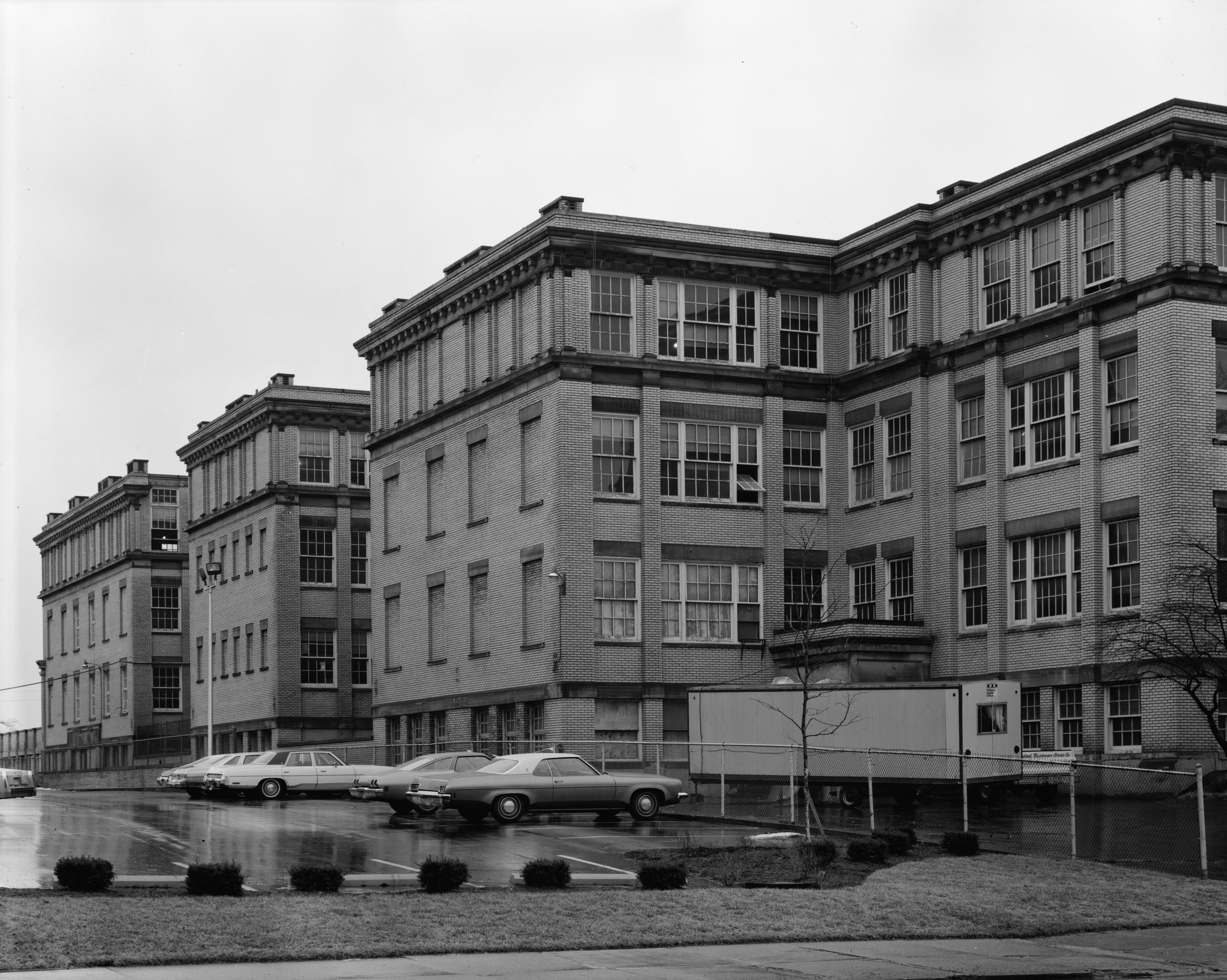
Old McKinley High School building at Canton McKinley High School

In 1876, Hammond worked as a draftsman in the office of William G. Preston and in the office of William Ware in Boston. He began independent work in 1878 and became part of the Koehler & Hammond firm for a year, bringing him to Cleveland in 1885 to work on the Hollenden Hotel. He moved to Cleveland in 1886. He was active in Cleveland until 1926. Hammond lived at 1863 Caldwell Road in Cleveland Heights.

He designed hospitals, schools, factories, and power buildings in Chicago, Kansas City, New Orleans, Toronto, and Montreal. Hammond's home in Cleveland Heights is "a fine Colonial Revival residence". Hammond designed several suburban homes, especially in the Clifton Park area of Lakewood and published A Treatise on Hospital and Asylum Construction in 1891.

=== Hollenden Hotel ===
Liberty E. Holden commissioned Hammond to design the 8-story Hollenden Hotel in Cleveland, one of the area's first hotels to be made fire resistant. It was said to have been outfitted handsomely with "massive redwood and mahogany fittings", exclusively designed furniture, a crystal dining room that politicians used as a meeting place. It "boasted electric lights, 100 private baths, and fireproof construction"

Much of the interior design work was overseen by Hammond. The hotel was said to have had the longest bar in town, and to have been a meeting place for precinct workers, when it was not hosting "colorful balls and festivities". Five presidents, McKinley, Theodore Roosevelt, Taft, Wilson and Harding, and many other dignitaries and celebrities stayed at the hotel.

It was upgraded and expanded in a $5 million effort and was managed by several owners until 1960 when the 600 Superior Corporation bought it, but two years later with developer Jas M. Carney they demolished mostly empty guest house and built a new 400 room Hollenden House and parking garage that opened in 1965. With the decline of downtown Cleveland it became unprofitable in the 1980s and closed permanently in 1989. John W. Galbreath built a 32-story office building on the site.

Hammond wrote an article in Concrete-cement Age, "An Unusual Work in Concrete and Stone", about his application of Egyptian architecture in his design work at the Hammend Hotel in Cleveland. He originally wanted the foyer by the elevator on each floor to represent a different country, but eventually the plan was not adopted, but the basement foyer was modeled after it and made to imitate "red Syrene granite" architecture of Egypt. The article is illustrated with a view of the hotel's basement elevator foyer showing the completed work carried out by The George Rackle & Sons Co. of Cleveland including columns types Hammond said were found at Egypt's Philae temple, as well as panels featuring Isis and Osiris sculpted by Jirouch of Fisher and Jirouch Co. Hammons spoke of his own trip to Egypt and the "1,500 to 2,000" negatives he made to use along with pictures from professional photographers. He also wrote foreword praising Skeleton construction in buildings.

=== Other work ===
He planned a $6,000 residence for C.L. Lane at 54 Front Street in Berea, Ohio

== Personal life ==
Hammond married Annie Borland Barstow in 1883 and after her death in 1886 married Annie E. Butcher of Toronto in 1897 and they had a child Adelaide. They divorced in 1922 and Hammond's third wife was Dorothy Weirick, whom he divorced in 1931. Hammond retired in 1926 and died in Falls Village, Connecticut in 1938, although his obituary says Pittsfield, Massachusetts.

== Selected projects ==
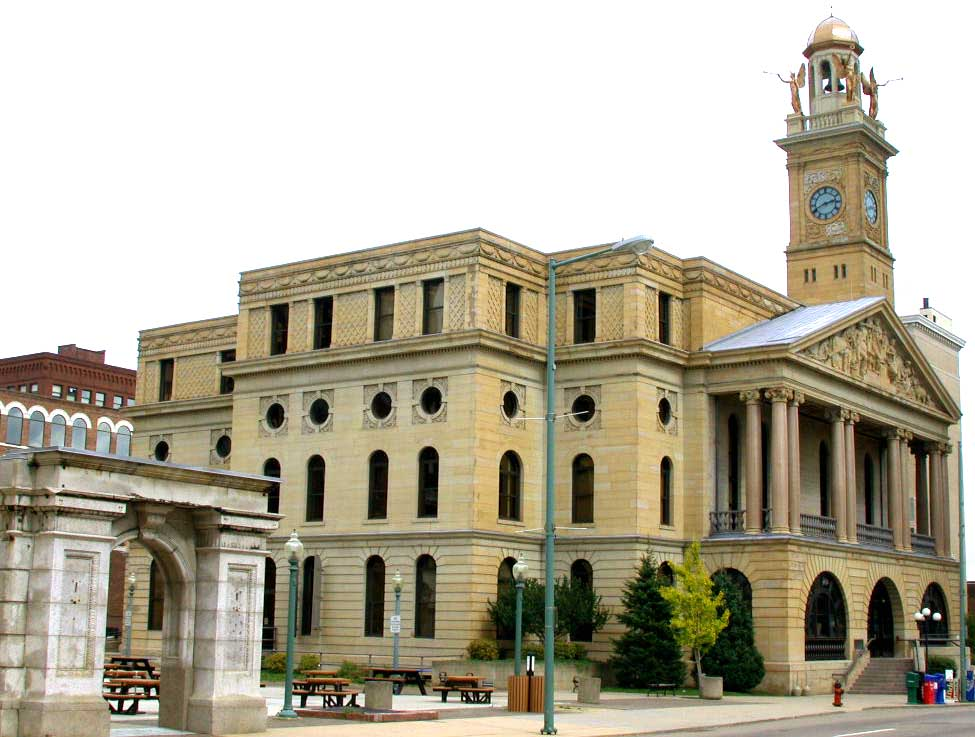
Stark County Courthouse

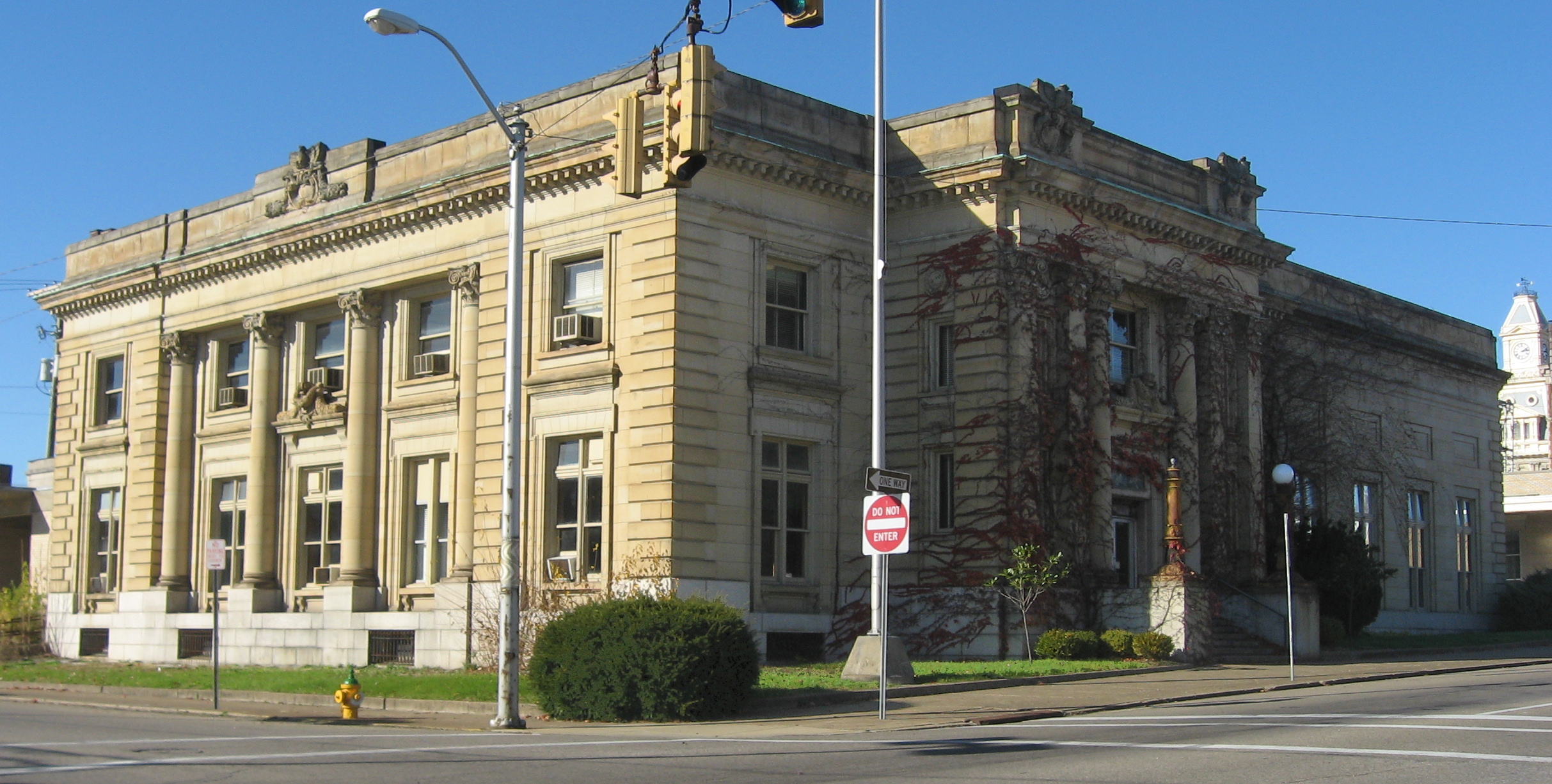
The now former post office and federal building in Zanesville

- Hollenden Hotel (1885) at the corner of Superior and East 6th (demolished 1962) He also authored Architectural Competitions for Public Buildings noted in Engineering magazine for subscription.
- Stark County Courthouse (1895), a building in the Beaux Arts Classicism architecture style.
- Lane Metropolitan Church (1900) at 2131 East 46
- Zanesville Federal Building
- Master campus plan and five original buildings of the Ohio State Normal College At Kent (Kent State University), 1911-15 including:
  - Lowry Hall
  - Merrill Hall
  - Administration Building (later renamed Cartwright Hall)
  - Science Hall (later renamed Kent Hall)
- Electric Building (1900) at 700 Prospect Avenue
- Original South Brooklyn Public Library (1905), in Cleveland. The library has since moved...
- Industrial Building (1909) 2336-2344 of Canal Road in Cleveland
- McKinley High School (1921), 800 North Market Street a classical revival school building in Cleveland.

=== Demolished ===
- Gillsy Hotel (demolished)
