= Hollenden Hotel =

Former luxury hotel in Cleveland, Ohio

Coordinates: 41°30′05″N 81°41′23″W

The Hollenden Hotel
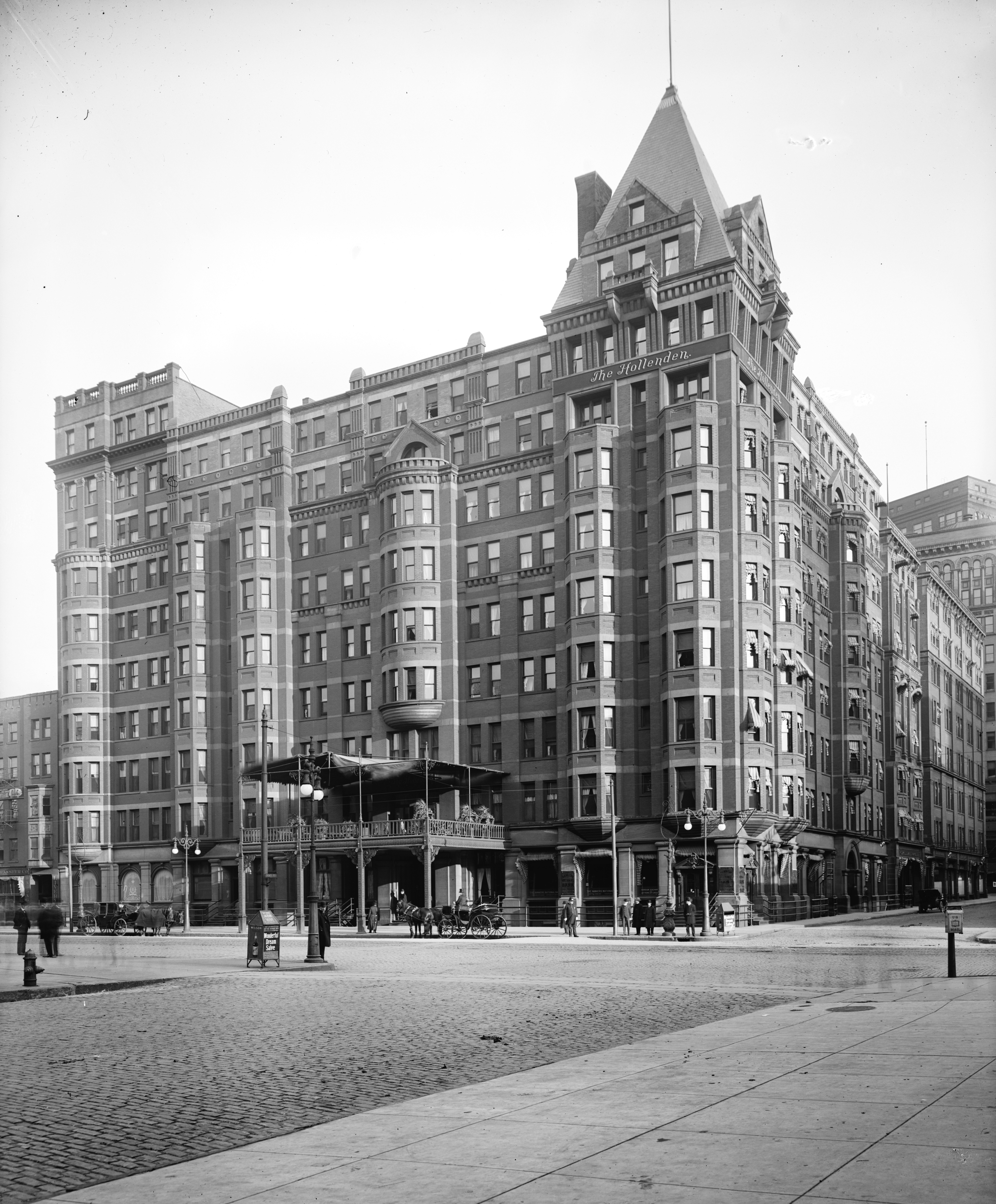
- The Hollenden Hotel, circa 1903
- Interactive map of the The Hollenden Hotel area

General information
- Location: Superior and Bond (E. 6th) St. Cleveland, Ohio
- Opening: 1885
- Closed: 1962

Technical details
- Floor count: 8

Design and construction
- Architect: George F. Hammond

Other information
- Number of rooms: 1000

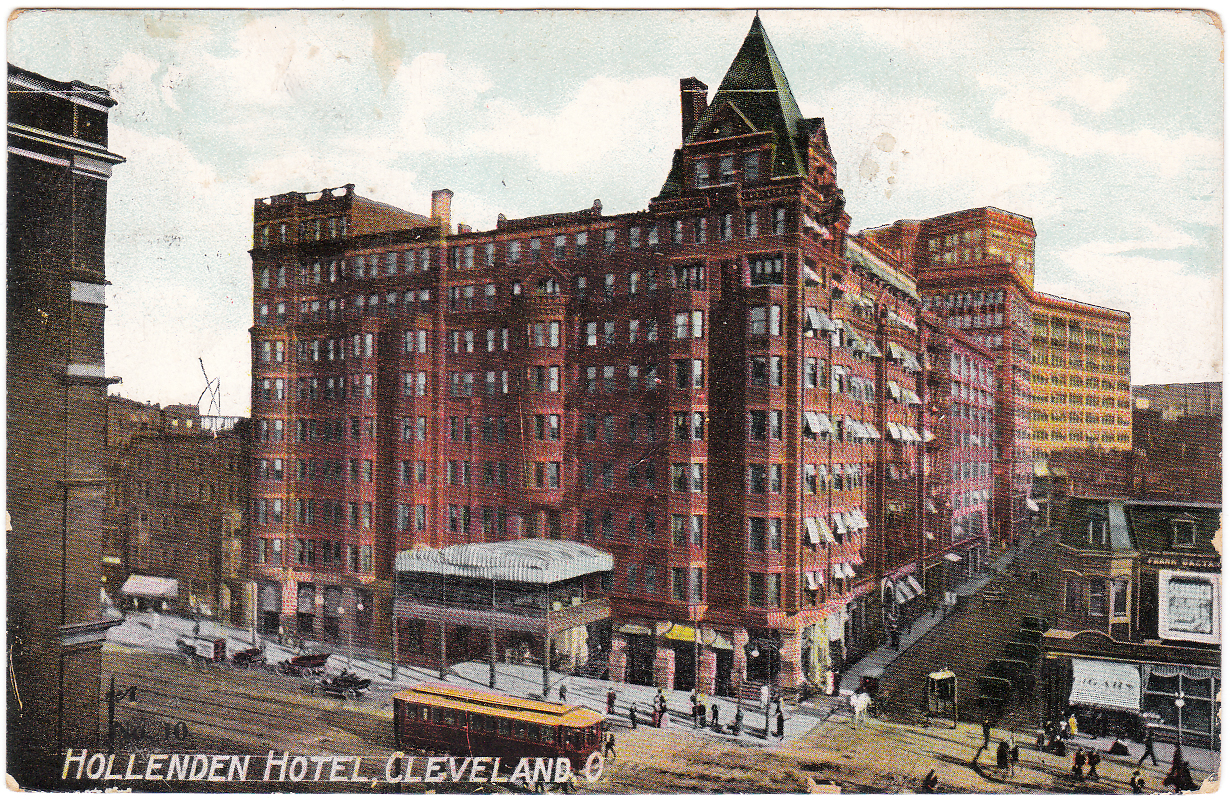
1909 Postcard of the Hollenden Hotel in Cleveland, Ohio.

The Hollenden Hotel was a luxury hotel in downtown Cleveland, Ohio. It opened in 1885, was significantly upgraded in 1926 and demolished in 1962. During the hotel's existence, it contained 1,000 rooms, 100 private baths, a lavish interior, electric lights and fireproof construction. As Cleveland's most glamorous hotel of the time, it hosted industrialists, celebrities and politicians, including five U.S. Presidents. The Fifth Third Center skyscraper currently occupies the hotel's former location.

== History ==
Liberty E. Holden, a real estate investor and owner of The Plain Dealer, purchased the land from Philo Chamberlain and created a corporation to build the hotel; he hired the Cleveland architect George F. Hammond to design it. He selected the name Hollenden, an early English form of the name Holden. When the hotel opened on June 7, 1885, it was considered a technological marvel because every room was equipped with electric lights and the building was fireproofed. Adding to the hotel's glamour, it contained 1,000 rooms, 100 private baths, a theater, barbershop along with several bars and clubs. The hotel housed permanent as well as temporary residents. The hotel's interiors consisted of paneled walls, redwood and mahogany fittings and were finished off with crystal chandeliers.

During the hotel's history, it had a reputation for hosting celebrities, industrial giants and various politicians, including the former U.S. Presidents McKinley, Theodore Roosevelt, Taft, Wilson and Harding. Albert Einstein stayed there in 1921 upon his first visit to the United States. In particular, politicians made the dining room a popular place for meetings. In 1929, the hotel hosted a dinner for Prince Nicholas of Romania and in 1960, it was the location for a speech by then-U.S. Senator John F. Kennedy.

In the 1920s, it was purchased by Detroit real estate investor Ben Tobin. A $5 million annex was built on the east side of the hotel in 1926, while the original hotel was modernized. From there, the hotel would have several owners until its final owner, the 600 Superior Corp bought it in 1960. The 600 Superior Corp did not have much success profiting from the hotel as only 350 of the 1,000 rooms were now commonly used. In 1962, only two years after buying the hotel, the owners closed the hotel and had it demolished.

The 600 Superior Corp along with developer James M. Carney subsequently built a new hotel, the 14-story, 400-room Hollenden House. The new hotel with a parking garage was opened on March 1, 1965. Poor economic conditions in Cleveland during the 1980s sealed the fate of the Hollenden House and it closed in May 1989. Later in 1989, the Hollenden House was demolished and soon after, developer John Galbreath purchased the site and had the Bank One Center, now known as Fifth Third Center, constructed by 1992.

== Events at the Hollenden ==
On March 18, 1909 the 8-year-old son of a leading attorney in Sharon, Pennsylvania, Willie Whitla, was kidnapped for $10,000 ransom. After the money was delivered the boy was released unharmed and put on a streetcar in Cleveland and reunited with his father at the Hollenden. The kidnappers were caught with $9,790 of the money.
