= Ohio State Normal College at Kent =

- U.S. National Register of Historic Places
- U.S. Historic district
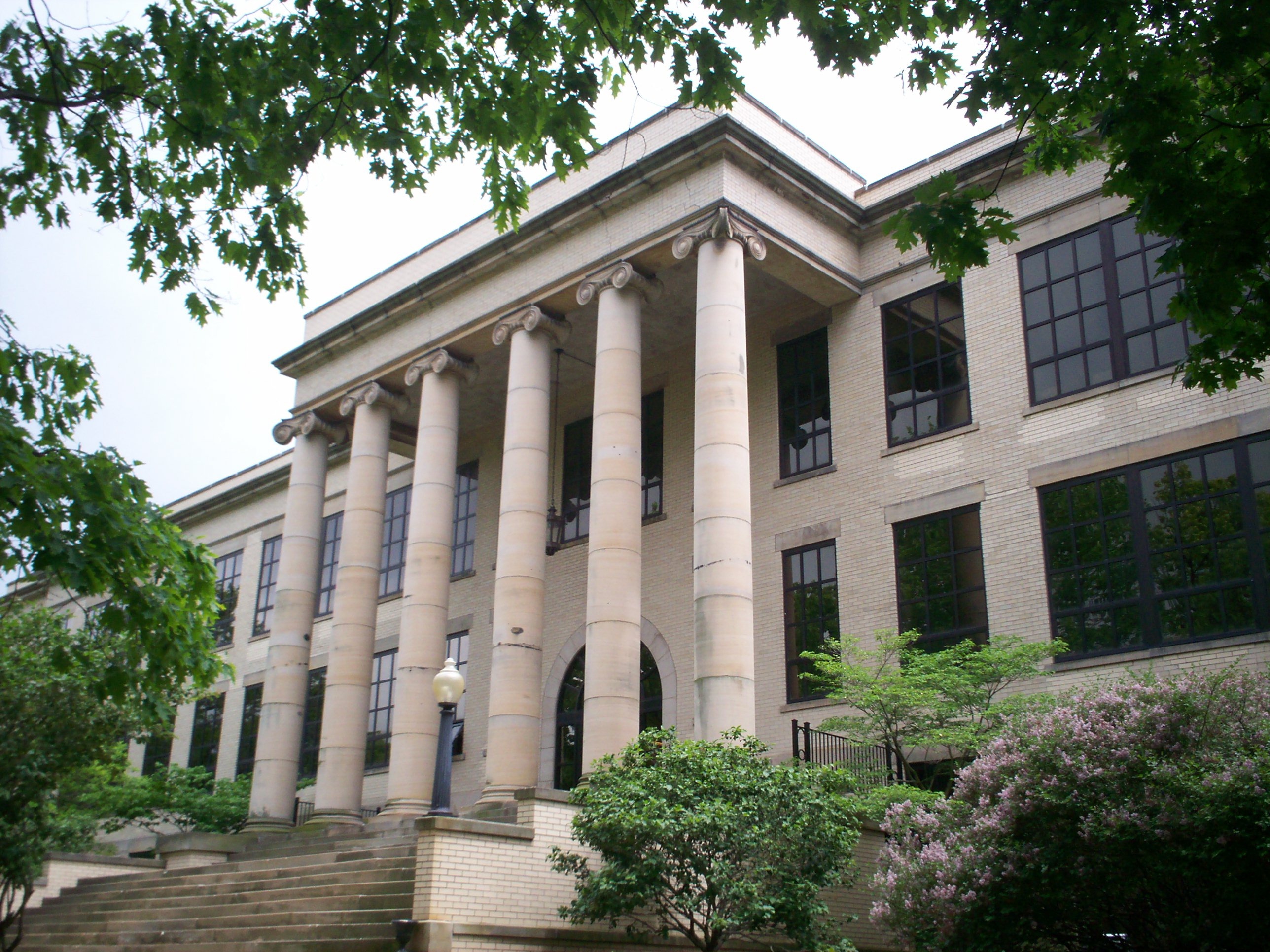

- Location within Ohio Location within the United States
- Location: Kent State University; Kent, Ohio
- Coordinates: 41°9′6″N 81°20′53″W
- Built: 1913-1917
- Architect: George Francis Hammond; Robert H.Evans & Co.
- Architectural style: Classical Revival
- NRHP reference No.: 75001526
- Added to NRHP: May 30, 1975

The Ohio State Normal College at Kent is a historic district in Kent, Ohio, United States. It consists of the five original buildings on the main campus of Kent State University, with the first, Merrill Hall, opening in 1913 and the last, Moulton Hall, opening in 1917. It was added to the National Register of Historic Places in 1975. The name of the district comes from the working name of what would later be named the Kent State Normal School in 1911 and ultimately Kent State University by 1935.

== History ==
On May 19, 1910, Ohio Governor Judson Harmon signed into law the Lowry bill to establish two normal schools in northern Ohio, one in the northwest and one in the northeast. A five-member search commission was formed to examine the bids from each community interested in hosting the schools. After eliminating several communities in two rounds of applications and presentations, the commission arrived in Kent September 27 and examined two sites in Kent including the 52.89-acre (21.40 ha) William S. Kent farm at the corner of East Main and South Lincoln and the Engelhart Farm on the southeast side of the village. The commission returned for a surprise visit November 11 to again examine the Kent farm with final hearings November 19. News officially reached Kent November 25 via a telegram to William S. Kent from the Normal Schools Commission. Governor Judson Harmon announced that Kent had been selected as the site of the normal school for northeast Ohio on December 1. It was initially known as the "Ohio State Normal College at Kent" until July 17, 1911 when the school was formally named by the new board of trustees. They agreed to name the school after William S. Kent as the Kent State Normal School making it the only public university in Ohio named for an individual. It was at the same time the Board hired John Edward McGilvrey as the school's first president and chose architect George F. Hammond to design the first two buildings and draft a campus master plan.

=== Planning and construction ===
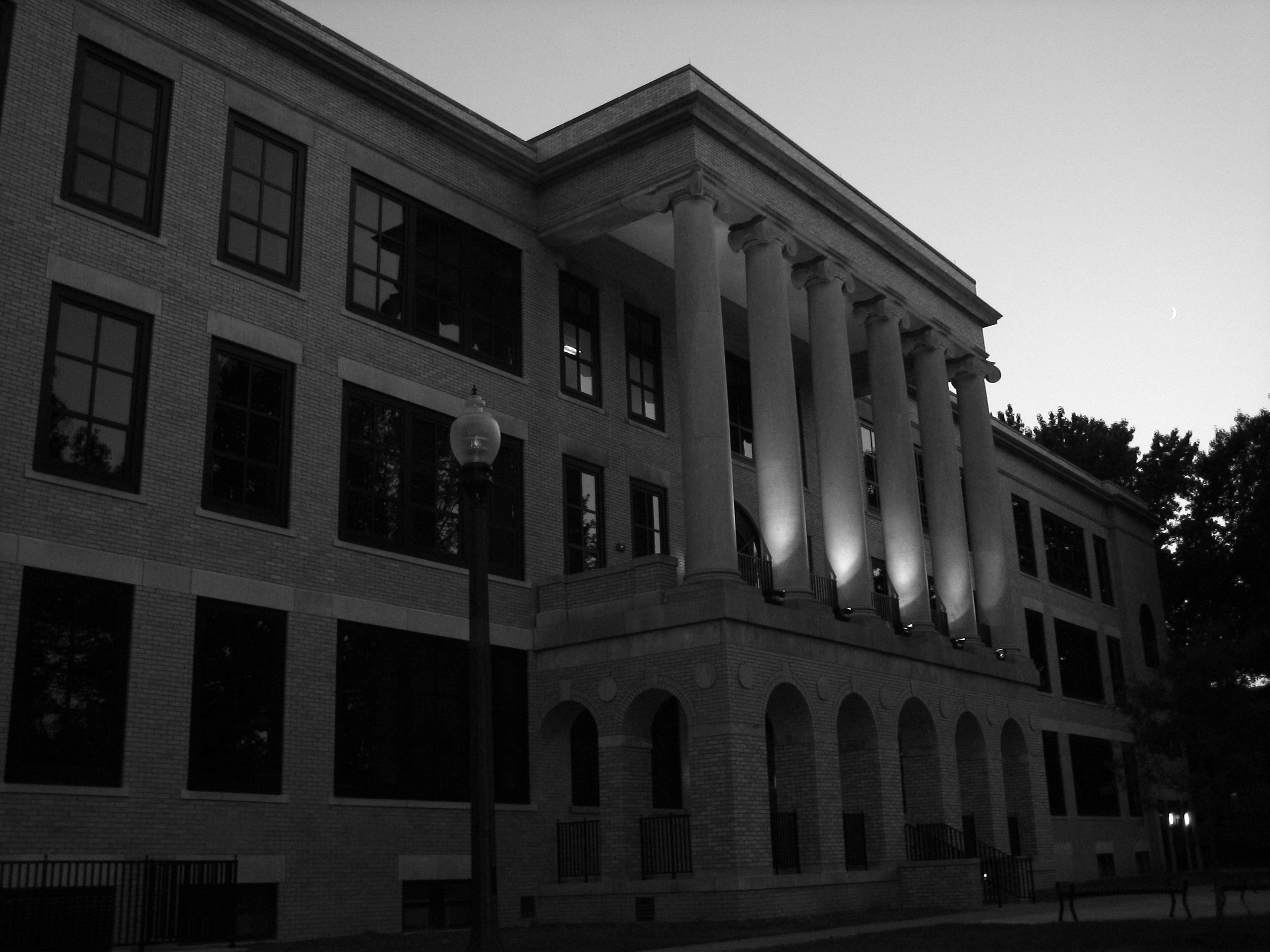
Front view of Kent Hall

The five original buildings were designed together in the classical revival style by architect George F. Hammond and were arranged in a semicircle at the top of the hill, originally as "Normal Hill", which overlooks the city of Kent. Construction formally began June 18, 1912 with a large cornerstone ceremony on the site of Merrill Hall. The ceremony included a parade and procession to the site as well as speeches by President McGilvrey and members of the Kent Board of Trustees. The cornerstone was laid by Frank Merrill, who included a time capsule which included several historic photographs and other historic documents related to the establishment of the school.

Merrill Hall was completed first in time to host the first classes on the campus May 19, 1913, the beginning of the first summer term, though McGilvrey had already begun classes at extension centers. 47 students attended that first session with 20 faculty members. Merrill Hall would serve as the home to all departments including the Teacher Training School, the library, and the administration until 1915. Lowry Hall would also open in 1913 as the first dormitory, then only for women. It was first referred to as "Walden Hall" because of its similar setting to Henry David Thoreau's Walden Pond before being named for John Hamilton Lowry in 1915. By 1915 the Administration Building (later to be the Auditorium Building and presently as Cartwright Hall) was opened along with Science Hall, today known as Kent Hall. The Administration Building also housed the library, an auditorium, and a makeshift gymnasium which would play host to Kent State's early basketball games. In addition to housing the science classes, Kent Hall also became the home of the University School until 1927. The final building of the original plan was Moulton Hall, an additional dormitory for women, which opened in 1917.

=== Modifications ===
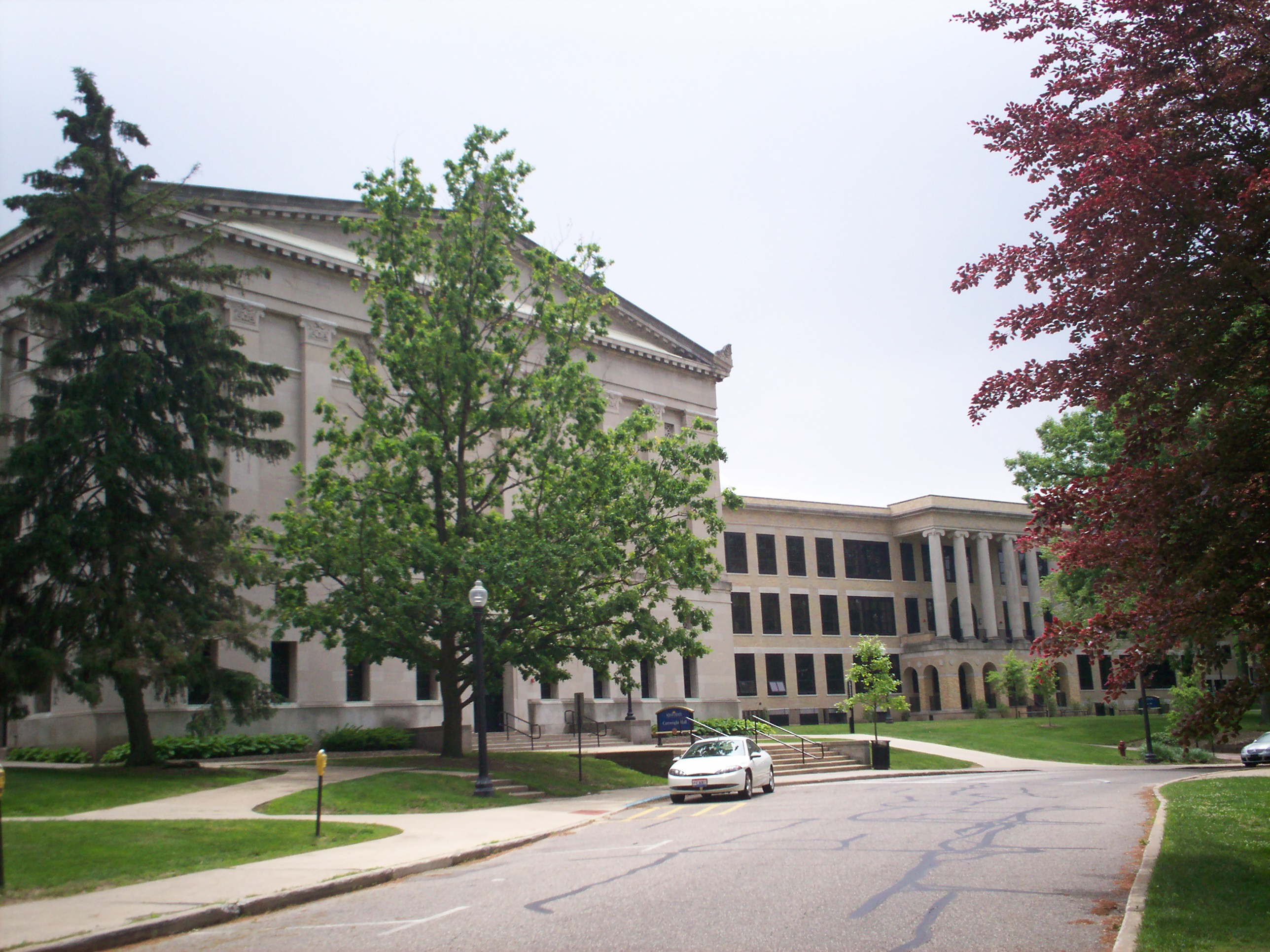
Cartwright Hall on the left with Kent Hall on the right in 2009.

Original plans called for the Administration Building (today's Cartwright Hall) to have a dome and be connected to classroom buildings (Merrill Hall and Kent Hall) on each side. The dome was never completed, but a facade was added in 1931 which gave the building its present pitched roof. The covered connections were built, but eventually removed in later renovations. In 1923, construction began on Wills Gymnasium, which was connected to the back of the Administration Building. It opened in 1925. An addition was also built onto Lowry Hall beginning in 1923. In 1926 construction began on the William A. Cluff Teacher Training School (today known as Franklin Hall) adjacent to Kent Hall as the home for the University School followed by Rockwell Hall in 1927 to house the library, both opening in 1928. Merrill Hall was renovated in 1931 and Science Hall was renamed William S. Kent Hall in 1938 after the opening of McGilvrey Hall as the new home for the science department.

During World War II, Lowry Hall housed members of the Civil Aeronautics Administration War Training Service. As the campus began to expand and grow at the conclusion of World War II, new dorms and classroom buildings were built resulting in changes for the uses of every building in the district. A new student union building opened in 1948 as the center of campus activity slowly began to shift to the southeast. New dorm construction during the 1950s allowed for the conversion of both Lowry and Moulton Halls to be used as classroom buildings and other buildings would house several different departments at various time. Merrill Hall, for instance, would house the School of Music and the English Department in the 1950s with Kent Hall housing the School of Speech, Humanities, foreign languages, and several administrative offices at various times prior to 1960. Merrill Hall would again be renovated in 1969. By the 1970s, construction of the 12-story library and current student center and several other buildings during the 1960s established a new center of activity and the campus has continued to expand south and eastward from there. The Executive Offices were moved to the current location in the library in 1976 and the Wills Hall gymnasium and pool were demolished in 1979.

=== Current uses ===
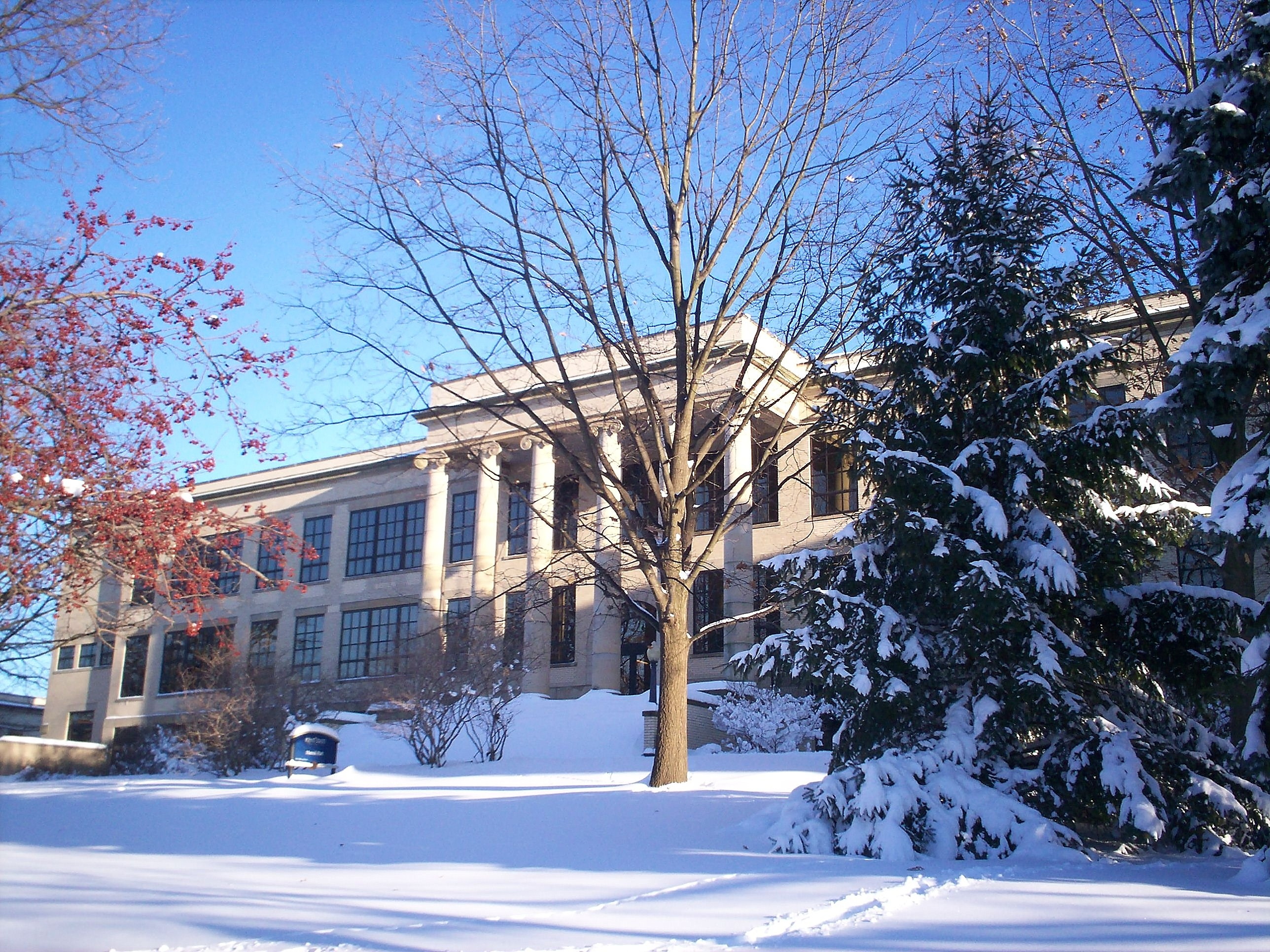
Merrill Hall in February 2010.

All buildings in the district were completely renovated throughout the latter half of the 1990s and most of the 2000s beginning with the renovation of Merrill Hall, which was completed in 1994, and ending with the renovation of Kent Hall in 2005. Merrill Hall now houses the Department of Sociology and the Institute for the Study and Prevention of Violence. Lowry Hall was renovated in 1996 and is now home to the Department of Anthropology, the Office of the University Architect, Facilities Planning and Operations, Kent State University Press, Faculty/Staff Assistance Programs, and the Institute of Research and Decision Support and, along with Moulton Hall, the College of Public Health, which began offering online courses in 2009 and classroom courses in August 2010. Moulton Hall was renovated in 1998. It now houses Educational Technology and Distance Leaning, the Dean's Office for the College of Communication and Information, the Faculty Professional Development Center, and the Research Center for Educational Technology. Cartwright Hall's renovations were completed in 2002. What remained of Wills Hall was demolished and replaced with a new lobby for the University Auditorium. It was renamed for President Carol Cartwright following her retirement in 2006 and houses the University Auditorium, the Division of Research and Graduate Studies, and the Institute for Study and Prevention of Violence. Renovations and an addition to Kent Hall were completed in 2005. It currently houses the Department of Psychology.

== Structures ==
Contributing Structures
Name	Built	Renovated	Additions	Named for	Other names	Photo
Merrill Hall	1912–1913	1931; 1969; 1994		Frank Merrill, one of the first trustees and member of Kent Board of Trade		
Lowry Hall	1912–1913	1996	1923; 1937	John Hamilton Lowry, sponsor of Lowry bill	Walden Hall (unofficial); 1913–1915	
Kent Hall	1914–1915	2005	2005	William S. Kent, donor of original campus land and namesake of school	Science Hall; 1915–1938	
Cartwright Hall	1914–1915	2002	1923; 1931; 2002	Carol Cartwright, university president 1991–2006	Administration Building; 1915–1976; Auditorium Building; 1976–2006	
Moulton Hall	1916–1917	1998		Edwin F. Moulton, first president of Board of Trustees		
Non-contributing Structures
Rockwell Hall	1927–1928	1986; 1990	1958	David L. Rockwell, Board of Trustees president and member of Kent Board of Trade		

== See also ==
- History of Kent, Ohio
- National Register of Historic Places listings in Portage County, Ohio
