= Wills Gymnasium =

Former indoor arena in Kent, Ohio

- Rear view in 1969
- Interactive map of Wills Gymnasium
- Location: Kent, Ohio, United States
- Coordinates: 41°9′3.39″N 81°20′54.7″W
- Owner: Kent State University
- Operator: Kent State University
- Capacity: 4,000
- Surface: Hardwood

Construction
- Groundbreaking: 1924
- Opened: May 16, 1925
- Closed: July 1979
- Demolished: August 1979 (gymnasium); 2000 (remainder)
- Cost: $175,000 ($3.21 million in 2025 dollars)
- Architects: Ronan and Ingleson

Tenants
- Kent State Golden Flashes (NCAA); Men's basketball (1925–1950); Wrestling (1928–1950); Men's gymnastics (1930–1979); Men's swimming (1936–1950); Women's gymnastics (1959–1979); Women's volleyball (1975–1977); Women's basketball (1976–1977)

Wills Gymnasium, often referred to as Wills Gym, was a multi-purpose athletic facility on the campus of Kent State University in Kent, Ohio, United States. Construction started in 1924 and the building was dedicated in 1925. It was the first dedicated gymnasium on the KSU campus, which had opened in 1913. Before the opening of Wills Gym, physical education classes and the intercollegiate and intramural sports teams used a variety of spaces for games and classes, both on campus in other buildings and off campus. The main gym seated approximately 4,000 people and the basement level included an indoor pool, locker rooms, and bowling alley. At the time, its capacity made it one of the largest facilities in the region. The building served as the primary home of the university's athletic teams and physical education department until 1950, when the Men's Physical Education Building opened. Wills Gym was the first permanent home of the Kent State Golden Flashes men's basketball team, and was also the original home venue for wrestling, men's swimming, men's and women's gymnastics, women's volleyball, and women's basketball.

Even after being replaced as the primary athletic venue and physical education facility, Wills Gym continued to be used as the home venue for men's gymnastics, later joined by women's gymnastics in 1959, and women's volleyball and basketball in 1975. It was also used for women's physical education, intramural sports, class registration, and other activities for nearly 30 years. By the 1970s, structural and maintenance issues along with the passage and implementation of Title IX resulted in plans to build a replacement for Wills. Women's basketball and volleyball left Wills after their respective 1977 seasons and moved to Memorial Gym, while both gymnastics teams played part of their home schedules at Wills until 1979. The building was condemned by the state of Ohio in the mid-1970s. Physical education classes and offices were moved to the new Memorial Gym Annex, completed in mid-1979. In August 1979, the gymnasium and pool were razed, though the portion of the building which had housed the physical education offices remained as Wills Hall and housed the Air Force Reserve Officer Training Corps (ROTC) program from 1983 to 2000. A parking lot was built on the site of the gym and pool. In the early 2000s, Wills Hall was torn down and replaced with a lobby area as part of the renovation of the adjacent University Auditorium, which was renamed Cartwright Hall in 2006.

== History ==
Interior of the playing floor in 1934 showing windows and skylight

A gymnasium was part of the original plans for the Kent State Normal School and plans were presented to the Ohio State Legislature in 1916 for its construction along with a heating plant and additional dormitory. The allocation of funds for the gym, however, was not approved until 1923 due to World War I. In the meantime, physical education, intramural, and intercollegiate sports used a variety of other spaces. Early basketball games were held in various locations, such as the atrium of the original Administration Building (known as Cartwright Hall since 2006), in the basement of the original heating plant, in the local Congregational Church gymnasium, and at Theodore Roosevelt High School.

The site chosen for the gym was a swampy area known as Blackbird Lake, located directly behind the original Administration Building, which had been completed in 1914. Construction started on Wills Gym in 1924 and it was dedicated May 16, 1925. Initially, it was simply called "the Gymnasium" before being named for David C. Wills, who was chairman of the Kent State Board of Trustees at the time. Built as an annex to the Administration Building, the facility featured the main gymnasium, which had a balcony with seating for 650 people and an overall capacity of approximately 4,000. In the basement were shower areas, a six-lane swimming pool, and a six-lane bowling alley. Offices for the new Physical Education Department—which had been mandated by the state of Ohio a year earlier—and Intercollegiate Athletics were located on the first floor.

Wills Gym was hailed as "one of finest gymnasiums in Ohio" by the school's 1927 yearbook, The Chestnut Burr, adding that teams who traveled to Kent for basketball or football games always wanted to see the gym. The first men's basketball game at Wills Gym was a 37–24 loss to Mount Union College on January 5, 1926, to open the 1925–26 season. A varsity wrestling team began play in 1928, followed by men's gymnastics in 1930, and men's swimming in 1936. The gym was also a frequent site for high school games and tournaments, and served as the home court for the Kent State High School Blue Devils until 1956.

Following World War II, a large increase in the number of male students led to the expansion of the school, and of the athletic and physical education departments in particular, which included construction of a new Men's Physical Education Building. The new gym was completed in 1950 with seating for 7,000 and could hold as many as 10,000. It replaced Wills Gym as the home of men's physical education and as the venue for the men's basketball, swimming, and wrestling teams. The final men's basketball game at Wills was a 68–47 win over the Western Reserve Red Cats on March 7, 1950.

Men's gymnastics continued to use Wills Gymnasium as their home venue and were joined by the women's gymnastics team in 1959, the first women's collegiate gymnastics team in the United States. The 1972 passage of Title IX led to the establishment of intercollegiate women's volleyball and women's basketball teams in 1975, with home games at Wills Gym. In addition to equal playing opportunities for female athletes, however, Title IX also required equal facilities for both men and women and the facilities at Wills were not only older and in deteriorating condition, but were considerably smaller than those at the Memorial Gym as the seating capacity at Wills Gym had been reduced to near 100 by the mid-1970s. Both women's teams initially played all or most of their schedule at Wills for their first few seasons before permanently moving to Memorial Gym for the 1977–78 seasons. The men's and women's gymnastics teams continued to have home meets at both Memorial and Wills through the 1979 season. The final gymnastics meet at Wills was the women's team's 150th win all-time.

In early 1970, most of the seats in the balcony were removed and the area was used to create classroom and office space. In the following years, structural and maintenance problems were evident and frequent, which may have been caused by the original swampy site. The building was closed and declared "unsafe" in March 1973, and while repairs were made to allow continued use of the gym, the building was not fully renovated. In late June 1979, just prior to the closure of the building, a large section of ceiling plaster above the pool collapsed. Offices and activities began moving to the new Memorial Gym Annex (now known as the MACC Annex) in mid July 1979 and demolition on Wills Gym began in early August 1979. The former offices of the physical education department remained after the demolition, known as Wills Hall, and served as the home of the Kent State chapter of the Air Force Reserve Officer Training Corps (ROTC) from 1983 to 2000. Wills Hall was razed in 2000 as part of a renovation and expansion to adjacent Cartwright Hall, then known as the Auditorium Building.

=== Other uses ===
In addition to physical education and intercollegiate and intramural athletics, Wills Gym hosted class registration for many years, and was also used for dances and other large social events, such as those related to homecoming. In 1940, Wills Gym was the site of the final game of the National Basketball League championship, between the Akron Firestone Non-Skids and Oshkosh All-Stars, won by Firestone 61–60. The game was moved to Kent from the Firestone gym in Akron because Wills Gym had a larger seating capacity than other facilities in the area at the time. During the 1940s, Wills was used for a high school basketball tournament featuring the rural schools of Portage County. The gym was also a regular site for Ohio high school sectional and district tournament games for both size classifications at the time, Class A and Class B, with some Class A games drawing capacity crowds in excess of 4,000 people.

Wills Gym was also an occasional concert performance venue for various groups and individuals. Among the many performances it hosted was the Cleveland Orchestra's summer orchestra in 1947 and 1950. Even after the opening of the larger MAC Center in 1950, it continued to host various concerts and performances, hosting dancer Pearl Primus in 1951, Vaughn Monroe and the Sauter-Finegan Orchestra in 1954, Buddy Morrow and his orchestra in 1956, and Eric Burdon and The Animals in 1968.

== Architecture ==
Interior view in 1930 during a physical education class. Balcony seats, windows, and lower-level bleacher seating can be seen in the background.

The exterior facade of Wills Gym was brick with embedded columns and rectangular windows, similar to the adjacent Cartwright, Kent, and Merrill Halls, all of which were designed in the Neoclassical style, prominent in the early 20th century. Total space was 51,676 square feet (4,800.9 m^{2}) with 37,694 square feet (3,501.9 m^{2}) listed as "assignable space".

The interior was divided into three levels, with two levels above ground and the lower level just below ground. The main gymnasium occupied most of the upper two levels on one side. It featured large windows on three sides, and originally had a large skylight in the center over the gym floor. Three double doorways were located on the sideline opposite the balcony, which led to short staircases with access to the parking lot. On the fourth side on the upper level was the balcony section, which had fixed chairback seating and smaller windows on all three exterior walls near the ceiling. In 1970, the seating and tiers in the balcony were removed and the area was largely converted into additional classroom space. The remainder of the seating in the gym was provided by bleacher seats, which were located around the playing floor. On the ground floor under the balcony section were offices and storage areas, including a mail room. For a time, the campus police department also maintained an office in Wills Gym. A corridor in the center of the level connected Wills Gym with the adjacent University Auditorium in what is now known as Cartwright Hall.

The lower level mainly contained the pool and locker rooms, as well as the power and heating utilities rooms. When the building was dedicated in 1925, much of the basement was still unfinished. Originally, the lower level was a larger open space and also included a seating area adjacent to the pool and bowling alleys. The level was later subdivided into smaller rooms. There were windows on three sides of the basement level, but because it was mostly below ground, they were smaller and higher on the walls.

== Site ==
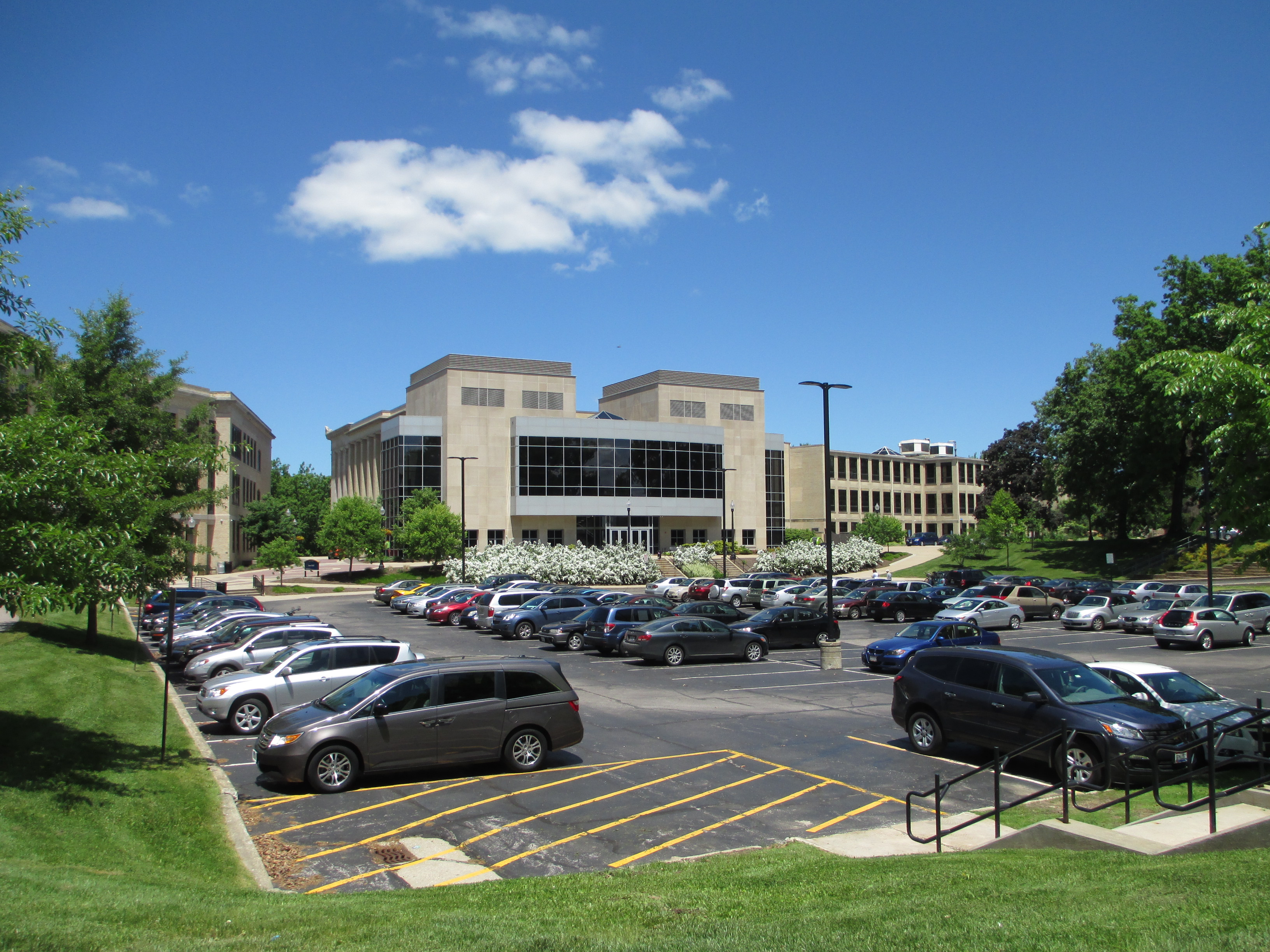
Site of Wills Gymnasium in 2014, with the rear of Cartwright Hall in the center background

The area formerly occupied by Wills Gymnasium is mostly covered by a parking lot behind Cartwright Hall, which houses the 800-seat University Auditorium. The main lobby for the auditorium, built in 2002, is where Wills Hall stood and overlaps the northern end of Wills Gymnasium, over the part of the building that housed the physical education offices.
