= List of Kent State Golden Flashes men's basketball seasons =

The following is a list of seasons completed by the Kent State Golden Flashes men's basketball program at Kent State University in Kent, Ohio, United States. The team was established in 1913 and plays at the Division I level of the National Collegiate Athletic Association (NCAA) as members of the Mid-American Conference (MAC) East Division. Kent State played its first intercollegiate game in January 1915 and began play in the MAC in 1951 after playing in the Ohio Athletic Conference (OAC) from 1932–1951. Since 1950, the team has played home games at the Memorial Athletic and Convocation Center. Through the 2017–18 season, the Golden Flashes have won six Mid-American Conference regular-season championships, six MAC tournament titles, and nine MAC East Division titles. In post-season play, the program has made six appearances in the NCAA tournament, advancing to the Elite Eight in 2002. Additionally, Kent State has nine appearances in the National Invitational Tournament (NIT) and five appearances in the CollegeInsider.com Postseason Tournament (CIT).

== Yearly results ==
Conference division champions	Conference champions	Conference tournament champions	Postseason berth

Season	Head coach	Season results							Conference tournament result	Postseason result	Final Coaches Poll
Season	Head coach	Overall			Conference				Conference tournament result	Postseason result	Final Coaches Poll
Season	Head coach	Wins	Losses	%	Wins	Losses	%	Finish	Conference tournament result	Postseason result	Final Coaches Poll
Independent
1913–14	Alexander Whyte	7	2	.778	—	—	—	—	—	—	—
1914–15	Alexander Whyte	3	2	.600	—	—	—	—	—	—	—
1915–16	Donald Ulrich	4	8	.333	—	—	—	—	—	—	—
1916–17	Donald Ulrich	2	6	.250	—	—	—	—	—	—	—
1917–18	No team	—	—	—	—	—	—	—	—	—	—
1918–19	No team	—	—	—	—	—	—	—	—	—	—
1919–20	Paul Chandler	2	4	.333	—	—	—	—	—	—	—
1920–21	Paul Chandler	4	7	.364	—	—	—	—	—	—	—
1921–22	Paul Chandler	1	7	.125	—	—	—	—	—	—	—
1922–23	Paul Chandler	4	6	.400	—	—	—	—	—	—	—
1923–24	Frank Harsh	4	9	.308	—	—	—	—	—	—	—
1924–25	Frank Harsh	4	8	.333	—	—	—	—	—	—	—
1925–26	Merle Wagoner	6	8	.429	—	—	—	—	—	—	—
1926–27	Merle Wagoner	5	11	.313	—	—	—	—	—	—	—
1927–28	Merle Wagoner	3	13	.188	—	—	—	—	—	—	—
1928–29	Merle Wagoner	11	7	.611	—	—	—	—	—	—	—
1929–30	Merle Wagoner	4	9	.308	—	—	—	—	—	—	—
1930–31	Merle Wagoner	8	9	.471	—	—	—	—	—	—	—
1931–32	Merle Wagoner	2	13	.133	—	—	—	—	—	—	—
Ohio Athletic Conference	Merle Wagoner										
1932–33		4	11	.267	3	10	.231	T-15th	—	—	—
1933–34	August Peterka	5	9	.357	5	9	.357	16th	—	—	—
1934–35	August Peterka	8	6	.571	7	6	.538	T-11th	—	—	—
1935–36	Donald Starn	10	7	.588	6	7	.462	13th	—	—	—
1936–37	Donald Starn	15	7	.682	9	4	.692	7th	—	—	—
1937–38	Donald Starn	10	13	.435	4	9	.308	12th	—	—	—
1938–39	Donald Starn	12	11	.522	7	7	.500	T-10th	—	—	—
1939–40	Donald Starn	13	10	.565	5	7	.417	14th	—	—	—
1940–41	Donald Starn	12	10	.545	4	7	.364	14th	—	—	—
1941–42	Donald Starn	14	11	.560	7	9	.438	10th	—	—	—
1942–43	Donald Starn	12	12	.500	9	6	.600	T-6th	—	—	—
1943–44	No Team	—	—	—	—	—	—	—	—	—	—
1944–45	William Satterlee	3	11	.214	1	5	.167	11th	—	—	—
1945–46	William Satterlee	10	10	.500	9	8	.529	T-9th	—	—	—
1946–47	Harry C. Adams	13	11	.542	7	8	.467	10th	—	—	—
1947–48	Harry C. Adams	15	8	.652	11	5	.688	6th	—	—	—
1948–49	Dave McDowell	20	8	.714	7	4	.636	3rd	1–1	—	—
1949–50	Dave McDowell	18	4	.818	5	4	.556	6th	—	—	—
1950–51	Dave McDowell	18	8	.692	7	0	1.000	NA	—	—	—
Mid-American Conference
1951–52	Clarence Haerr	14	10	.583	3	7	.300	6th	—	—	—
1952–53	Clarence Haerr	7	15	.318	3	9	.250	7th	—	—	—
1953–54	Clarence Haerr	8	13	.381	3	9	.250	7th	—	—	—
1954–55	Clarence Haerr	8	14	.364	5	9	.357	T-5th	—	—	—
1955–56	Dave McDowell	10	11	.476	5	7	.417	T-5th	—	—	—
1956–57	Dave McDowell	5	18	.217	2	10	.167	7th	—	—	—
1957–58	Bill Bertka	9	14	.391	3	9	.250	6th	—	—	—
1958–59	Bill Bertka	11	13	.458	5	6	.455	T-3rd	—	—	—
1959–60	Bill Bertka	7	16	.304	2	10	.167	7th	—	—	—
1960–61	Bill Bertka	9	14	.391	4	8	.333	T-5th	—	—	—
1961–62	Robert Doll	2	19	.095	1	11	.083	7th	—	—	—
1962–63	Robert Doll	3	18	.143	1	11	.083	T-6th	—	—	—
1963–64	Robert Doll	11	13	.458	5	7	.417	5th	—	—	—
1964–65	Robert Doll	9	11	.450	4	8	.333	5th	—	—	—
1965–66	Robert Doll	8	16	.333	3	9	.250	7th	—	—	—
1966–67	Frank Truitt	5	18	.217	1	11	.083	7th	—	—	—
1967–68	Frank Truitt	9	15	.375	3	9	.250	T-6th	—	—	—
1968–69	Frank Truitt	14	10	.583	6	6	.500	T-3rd	—	—	—
1969–70	Frank Truitt	7	17	.292	2	8	.200	T-5th	—	—	—
1970–71	Frank Truitt	13	11	.542	4	6	.400	T-5th	—	—	—
1971–72	Frank Truitt	7	17	.292	6	4	.600	3rd	—	—	—
1972–73	Frank Truitt	10	16	.385	5	7	.417	T-5th	—	—	—
1973–74	Frank Truitt	9	17	.346	1	11	.083	7th	—	—	—
1974–75	Rex Hughes	6	20	.231	3	11	.214	7th	—	—	—
1975–76	Rex Hughes	12	14	.462	7	9	.438	T-5th	—	—	—
1976–77	Rex Hughes	8	19	.296	4	12	.250	T-8th	—	—	—
1977–78	Rex Hughes/Mike Boyd	6	21	.222	4	12	.250	T-9th	—	—	—
1978–79	Ed Douma	13	14	.481	7	9	.438	5th	—	—	—
1979–80	Ed Douma	10	17	.370	7	9	.438	T-4th	0–1; Lost in quarterfinals	—	—
1980–81	Ed Douma	7	19	.269	5	11	.313	T-9th	Did not qualify	—	—
1981–82	Ed Douma	10	16	.385	6	10	.375	9th	Did not qualify	—	—
1982–83	Jim McDonald	15	13	.536	9	9	.500	6th	0–1; Lost in quarterfinals	—	—
1983–84	Jim McDonald	15	14	.517	8	10	.444	T-6th	2–1; Lost in final	—	—
1984–85	Jim McDonald	17	13	.567	11	7	.611	T-3rd	1–1; Lost in semifinals	0–1 in NIT	—
1985–86	Jim McDonald	11	16	.407	7	11	.389	T-6th	Did not qualify	—	—
1986–87	Jim McDonald	19	10	.655	11	5	.688	2nd	2–1; Lost in final	—	—
1987–88	Jim McDonald	10	18	.357	6	10	.375	7th	0–1; Lost in quarterfinals	—	—
1988–89	Jim McDonald	21	10	.677	12	4	.750	2nd	2–1; Lost in final	0–1 in NIT	—
1989–90	Jim McDonald	21	8	.724	12	4	.750	2nd	0–1; Lost in quarterfinals	0–1 in NIT	—
1990–91	Jim McDonald	10	18	.357	4	12	.250	8th	0–1; Lost in quarterfinals	—	—
1991–92	Jim McDonald	9	19	.321	6	10	.375	6th	0–1; Lost in quarterfinals	—	—
1992–93	Dave Grube	10	17	.370	7	11	.389	8th	0–1; Lost in quarterfinals	—	—
1993–94	Dave Grube	13	14	.481	8	10	.444	8th	0–1; Lost in quarterfinals	—	—
1994–95	Dave Grube	8	19	.296	5	13	.278	8th	0–1; Lost in quarterfinals	—	—
1995–96	Dave Grube	14	13	.519	8	10	.444	8th	0–1; Lost in quarterfinals	—	—
1996–97	Gary Waters	9	18	.333	7	11	.389	7th	0–1; Lost in quarterfinals	—	—
1997–98	Gary Waters	13	17	.433	9	9	.500	T-2nd-East	1–1; Lost in semifinals	—	—
1998–99	Gary Waters	23	7	.767	13	5	.722	2nd-East	3–0; Won tournament	0–1 in NCAA tournament	—
1999–00	Gary Waters	23	8	.742	13	5	.722	2nd-East	0–1; lost in quarterfinals	2–1 in NIT	—
2000–01	Gary Waters	24	10	.706	13	5	.722	1st-East	3–0; Won tournament	1–1 in NCAA tournament	—
2001–02	Stan Heath	30	6	.833	17	1	.944	1st-East	3–0; Won tournament	3–1 in NCAA tournament	12th
2002–03	Jim Christian	22	9	.710	12	6	.667	1st-East	2–1; Lost in final	0–1 in NIT	—
2003–04	Jim Christian	22	9	.710	13	5	.722	1st-East	2–1; Lost in final	0–1 in NIT	—
2004–05	Jim Christian	20	13	.606	11	7	.611	T-2nd-East	2–1; Lost in quarterfinals	0–1 in NIT	—
2005–06	Jim Christian	25	9	.735	15	3	.833	1st-East	3–0; Won tournament	0–1 in NCAA tournament	—
2006–07	Jim Christian	21	11	.656	12	4	.750	2nd-East	1–1; Lost in semifinals	—	—
2007–08	Jim Christian	28	7	.800	13	3	.813	1st-East	3–0; Won tournament	0–1 in NCAA tournament	—
2008–09	Geno Ford	19	15	.559	10	6	.625	T-3rd-East	1–1; Lost in quarterfinals	0–1 in CIT	—
2009–10	Geno Ford	24	10	.706	13	3	.813	1st-East	0–1; Lost in quarterfinals	1–1 in NIT	—
2010–11	Geno Ford	25	12	.676	12	4	.750	1st-East	2–1; Lost in final	2–1 in NIT	—
2011–12	Rob Senderoff	21	12	.636	10	6	.625	4th-East	1–1; Lost in semifinals	0–1 in CIT	—
2012–13	Rob Senderoff	21	14	.600	9	7	.563	3rd-East	1–1; Lost in semifinals	1–1 in CIT	—
2013–14	Rob Senderoff	16	16	.500	7	11	.389	5th-East	0–1; Lost in first round	—	—
2014–15	Rob Senderoff	23	12	.657	12	6	.667	T-1st-East	0–1; Lost in quarterfinals	2–1 in CIT	—
2015–16	Rob Senderoff	19	13	.594	10	8	.556	3rd-East	0–1; Lost in first round	—	—
2016–17	Rob Senderoff	22	14	.611	10	8	.556	4th-East	4–0; Won tournament	0–1 in NCAA tournament	—
2017–18	Rob Senderoff	17	17	.500	9	9	.500	2nd-East	2–1; Lost in semifinals	—	—
2018–19	Rob Senderoff	22	11	.667	11	7	.611	3rd-East	0–1; Lost in quarterfinals	0–1 in CIT	—
2019–20	Rob Senderoff	20	12	.625	9	9	.500	4th-East	1–0; tournament canceled	No postseason held	—
2020–21	Rob Senderoff	15	8	.652	12	6	.667	T-3rd	0–1; Lost in quarterfinals	—	—
2021–22	Rob Senderoff	23	11	.676	16	4	.800	2nd	2–1; Lost in final	0–1 in TBC	—
2022–23	Rob Senderoff	28	7	.800	15	3	.833	2nd	3–0; Won tournament	0–1 in NCAA tournament	—
2023–24	Rob Senderoff	17	17	.500	8	10	.444	8th	2–1; Lost in final	—	—
2024–25	Rob Senderoff	24	12	.667	11	7	.611	3rd	1–1; Lost in semifinals	2–1 in NIT	—
2025–26	Rob Senderoff	24	10	.706	14	4	.778	3rd	1–1; Lost in semifinals	0–1 in NIT	—
Totals	110 seasons	1,386	1,321	.512	590; 113	583; 115	.503 (MAC).496 (OAC)	6 MAC regular-season titles 9 MAC East Division titles	50–36 in MAC tournament 7 MAC tournament titles	4–7 in NCAA tournament 7–11 in NIT; 3–5 in CIT; 0–1 in TBC	

Conference division champions	Conference champions	Conference tournament champions	Postseason berth
