= Lowry Bill =

The Lowry Bill, also known as the Lowry Act and the Lowry Normal School Bill, was a bill introduced in 1910 in the Ohio state legislature which called for the establishment of two state normal schools in northern Ohio, one in the northeast and one in the northwest. It was named after its main sponsor, John Hamilton Lowry, a representative from northwest Ohio's Henry County. It was approved and signed into law by Ohio Governor Judson Harmon on May 19, 1910. Following its approval, the Commission on Normal School Sites was established and search committees were formed to determine the sites of the two schools with nearly forty communities applying. On November 25, 1910, the Commission announced that the villages of Kent in the northeast and Bowling Green in the northwest had been selected as the sites of the new schools. These schools would eventually evolve into what are today Kent State University and Bowling Green State University.

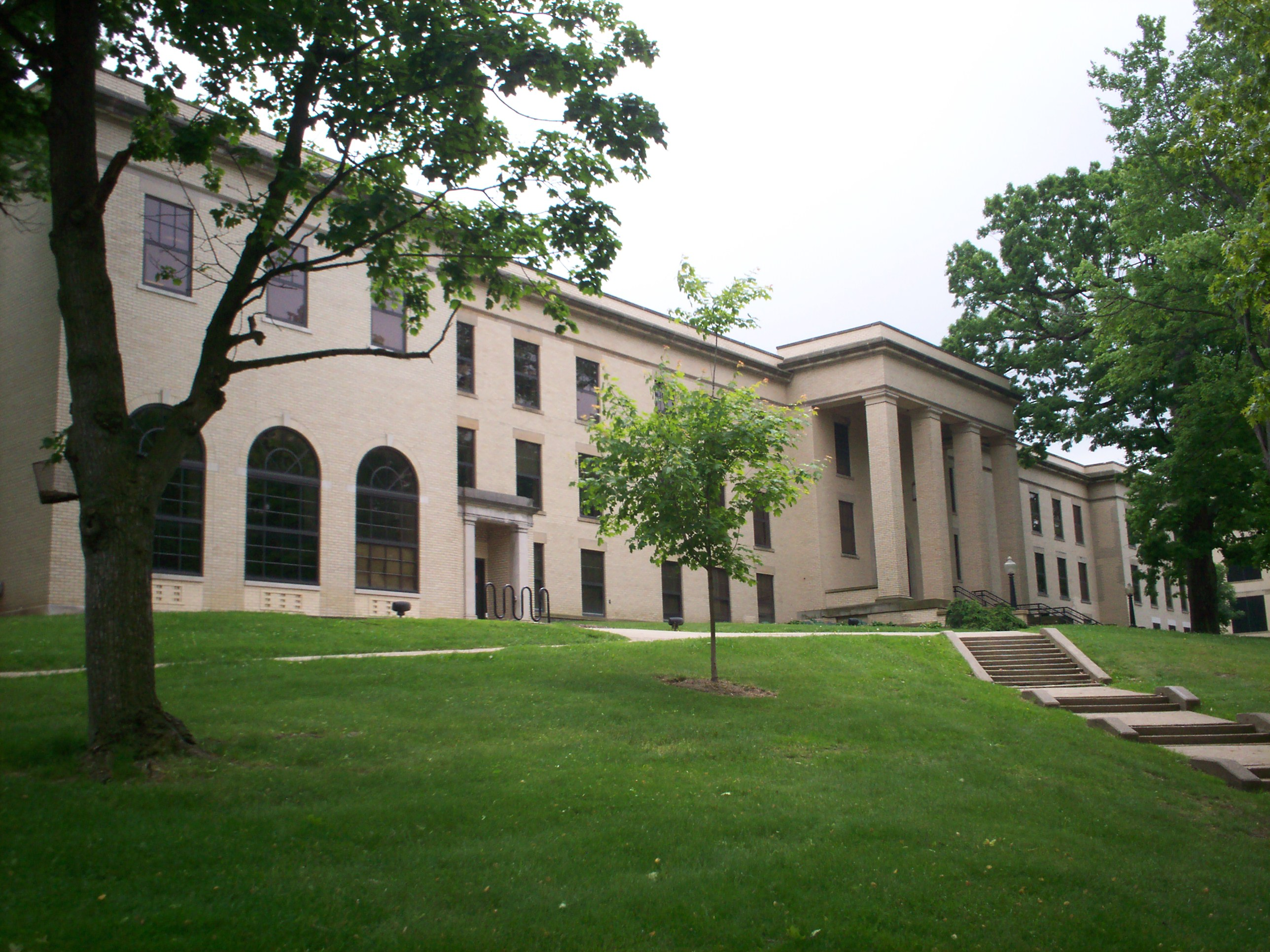
Lowry Hall at Kent State

Lowry Hall, one of the oldest buildings at Kent State University (built 1913), was named for John Hamilton Lowry.

== Purpose of the bill ==
Ohio did not have schools of education at its public universities until 1902 when they were established at Ohio University in Athens and Miami University in Oxford, followed by Ohio State University in Columbus in 1907. All three schools were located in the southern half of the state while the majority of the growth, population, and need for teachers were in northern Ohio. The Lowry bill was the first successful action to establish teacher training schools in northern Ohio after several failed attempts.
