= 1922 Notre Dame Fighting Irish football team =

American college football season

1922 Notre Dame Fighting Irish football
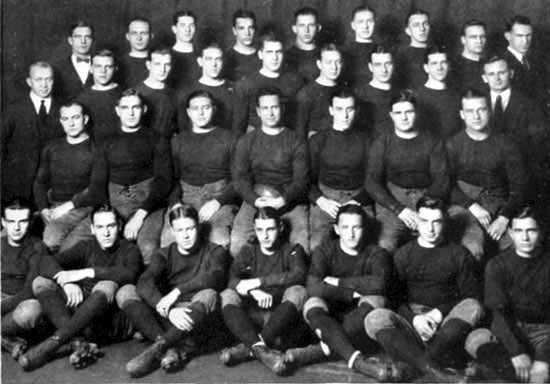
- Conference: Independent
- Record: 8–1–1
- Head coach: Knute Rockne (5th season)
- Offensive scheme: Notre Dame Box
- Base defense: 7–2–2
- Captain: Glen Carberry
- Home stadium: Cartier Field

1922 Midwestern college football independents records
	Conf.			Overall
Team	W	L	T	W		L		T
Western State Normal		–		6	–	0	–	0
Bradley		–		9	–	0	–	1
Marquette		–		8	–	0	–	1
Central Michigan		–		6	–	0	–	2
Notre Dame		–		8	–	1	–	1
Butler		–		8	–	2	–	0
Haskell		–		8	–	2	–	0
Detroit		–		7	–	2	–	1
Michigan Mines		–		1	–	0	–	1
Wabash		–		7	–	3	–	0
St. Ignatius (OH)		–		4	–	1	–	3
Dayton		–		6	–	3	–	0
Saint Louis		–		6	–	3	–	1
Valparaiso		–		3	–	2	–	2
Baldwin–Wallace		–		4	–	3	–	1
DePauw		–		4	–	3	–	2
Michigan Agricultural		–		3	–	5	–	2
Earlham		–		2	–	6	–	0
Kent State		–		0	–	7	–	0

The 1922 Notre Dame Fighting Irish football team was an American football team that represented the University of Notre Dame as an independent during the 1922 college football season. In their fifth year under head coach Knute Rockne, the Irish compiled an 8–1–1 record, shut out six opponents, and outscored all opponents by a total of 222 to 27. They were undefeated through the first nine games, defeating Purdue, Georgia Tech, 1922 Indiana Hoosiers football team, and 1922 Carnegie Tech Tartans football team, and playing Army to a scoreless tie at West Point on Armstice Day. In the final game of the season, played on Thanksgiving Day, the Irish lost their rivalry game Nebraska in Lincoln, Nebraska.

Fullback Paul Castner and guard Ed DeGree received first-team honors from one or more selectors on the 1922 All-America college football team. DeGree also received first-team All-Western honors from Walter Eckersall of the Chicago Tribune.

The team played its home games at Cartier Field in Notre Dame, Indiana.

== Schedule ==
Date	Opponent	Site	Result	Attendance	Source
September 30	Kalamazoo	Cartier Field; Notre Dame, IN	W 56–0	5,000	
October 7	Saint Louis	Cartier Field; Notre Dame, IN	W 26–0	6,000–7,000	
October 14	at Purdue	Stuart Field; West Lafayette, IN (rivalry)	W 20–0	9,000	
October 21	DePauw	Cartier Field; Notre Dame, IN	W 34–7	5,000	
October 28	at Georgia Tech	Grant Field; Atlanta, GA (rivalry)	W 13–3	18,000–20,000	
November 4	Indiana	Cartier Field; Notre Dame IN	W 27–0	22,000	
November 11	at Army	The Plain; West Point, NY (rivalry)	T 0–0	15,000	
November 18	at Butler	Indianapolis, IN	W 31–3	12,000	
November 25	at Carnegie Tech	Forbes Field; Pittsburgh, PA	W 19–0	30,000	
November 30	at Nebraska	Nebraska Field; Lincoln, NE (rivalry)	L 6–14	16,000	

== Personnel ==
=== Players ===
- Dutch Bergman, halfback, 160 pounds
- Harvey Brown, guard, 162 pounds
- Glen Carberry, captain and defensive end
- Paul Castner, fullback, 183 pounds
- Collins
- H. B. "Doc" Connell, halfback, 168 pounds
- Fod Cotton, tackle, 189 pounds
- Bernie Coughlin, halfback
- Jim Crowley, halfback, 153 pounds
- Ed DeGree, guard, 194 pounds
- August Desch
- Norm Feltes
- Neil Flinn
- John Flynn, tackle
- Ed Hunsinger, end
- Mickey Kane
- Noble Kizer, guard, 174 pounds
- Elmer Layden, halfback
- Tom Lieb, tackle
- Bernie Livergood, fullback, 174 pounds
- Les Logan
- Will Maher, halfback
- Gene Mayl, 185 pounds
- Paul McNulty, end, 171 pounds
- Don Miller, halfback, 158 pounds
- Edgar Miller, tackle
- Jerry Miller, 143 pounds
- R. Miller, tackle
- Mixon
- Gene Murphy, quarterback
- Eugene Oberst, tackle, 202 pounds
- Robert Regan, center, 160 pounds
- Riese
- Gus Stange, tackle
- Harry Stuhldreher, quarterback
- Frank Thomas, quarterback, 170 pounds
- George Vergara, defensive end, 181 pounds
- Bill Voss, center
- Adam Walsh, center
- John Weibel, guard

=== Coaching staff ===
- Head coach: Knute Rockne
- Assistant coach: Walter Halas
- Drilling: Roger Kiley
