= 1924 Notre Dame Fighting Irish football team =

American college football season

1924 Notre Dame Fighting Irish football
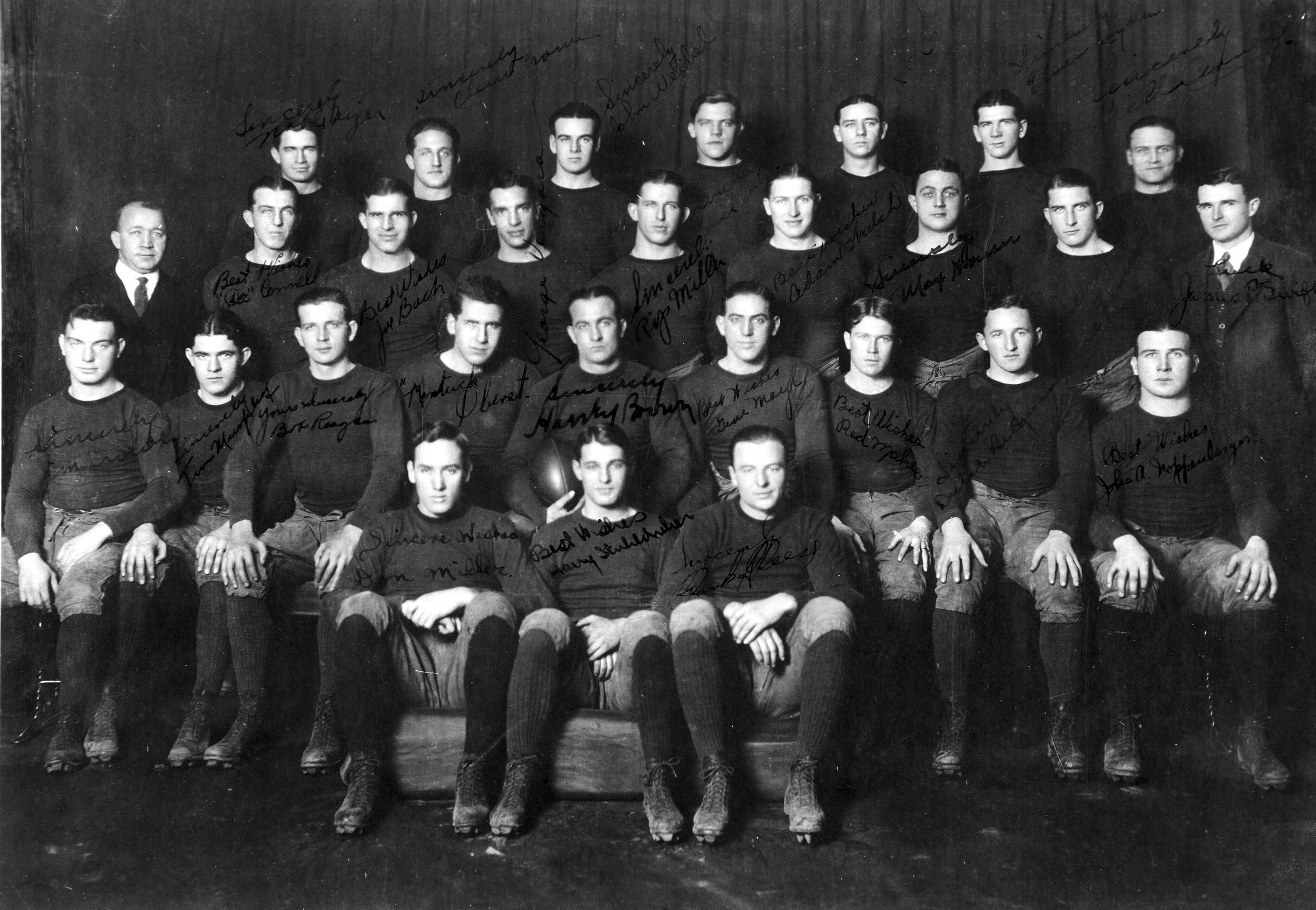

National champion (various selectors) Rose Bowl champion

Rose Bowl, W 27–10 vs. Stanford
- Conference: Independent
- Record: 10–0
- Head coach: Knute Rockne (7th season)
- Offensive scheme: Notre Dame Box
- Base defense: 7–2–2
- Captain: Adam Walsh
- Home stadium: Cartier Field

1924 Midwestern college football independents records
	Conf.			Overall
Team	W	L	T	W		L		T
No. 1 Notre Dame		–		10	–	0	–	0
Kirksville Osteopaths		–		6	–	0	–	0
Central Michigan		–		7	–	1	–	0
Western State Normal		–		6	–	1	–	0
John Carroll		–		7	–	2	–	0
Haskell		–		7	–	2	–	1
Indiana State		–		6	–	2	–	0
Loyola (IL)		–		5	–	2	–	2
Marquette		–		5	–	2	–	0
Dayton		–		7	–	3	–	0
Saint Louis		–		6	–	3	–	0
Michigan Agricultural		–		5	–	3	–	0
Wabash		–		5	–	4	–	0
Butler		–		4	–	5	–	0
Detroit		–		4	–	5	–	0
Muncie Normal		–		1	–	3	–	0
Michigan Mines		–		0	–	2	–	1
Kent State		–		0	–	4	–	0
Rankings from Dickinson System

The 1924 Notre Dame Fighting Irish football team was an American football team that represented the University of Notre Dame as an independent during the 1924 college football season. In their seventh season under head coach Knute Rockne, the Fighting Irish compiled a perfect 10–0 record, defeated Stanford in the 1925 Rose Bowl, and outscored opponents by a total of 285 to 54. The team was led by the legendary backfield known as the "Four Horsemen" consisting of quarterback Harry Stuhldreher, halfbacks Don Miller and Jim Crowley, and fullback Elmer Layden.

Notre Dame was ranked No. 1 in the Dickinson System's contemporary final ratings in the system's first year of existence. In 1926 the team was retroactively awarded the Rissman Trophy for this ranking.

In later decades, Notre Dame was rated as 1924 national champion by the Berryman QPRS system, Billingsley Report, Boand System, College Football Researchers Association, Helms Athletic Foundation, Houlgate System, National Championship Foundation, Poling System, and Jeff Sagarin.

Three of the Four Horsemen, Stuhldreher, Crowley, and Layden, were consensus first-team picks on the 1924 All-America college football team. Other notable players included tackle Joe Bach and center Adam Walsh. The Four Horsemen, Walsh, and coach Rockne were all later inducted into the College Football Hall of Fame.

The 1925 Rose Bowl was Notre Dame's last bowl appearance until the 1969 season. The Fighting Irish played their home games at Cartier Field.

== Schedule ==
Date	Opponent	Site	Result	Attendance	Source
October 4	Lombard	Cartier Field; Notre Dame, IN	W 40–0	8,000–9,000	
October 11	Wabash	Cartier Field; Notre Dame, IN	W 34–0	10,000–13,000	
October 18	vs. Army	Polo Grounds; New York, NY (rivalry)	W 13–7	50,000–55,000	
October 25	at Princeton	Palmer Stadium; Princeton, NJ	W 12–0	40,000	
November 1	Georgia Tech	Cartier Field; Notre Dame, IN (rivalry)	W 34–3	22,000–24,000	
November 8	at Wisconsin	Camp Randall Stadium; Madison, WI	W 38–3	28,425	
November 15	Nebraska	Cartier Field; Notre Dame, IN (rivalry)	W 34–6	22,000–26,000	
November 22	vs. Northwestern	Municipal Grant Park Stadium; Chicago, IL (rivalry)	W 13–6	35,000–45,000	
November 29	at Carnegie Tech	Forbes Field; Pittsburgh, PA	W 40–19	30,000–35,000	
January 1, 1925	vs. Stanford	Rose Bowl; Pasadena, CA (Rose Bowl)	W 27–10	53,000–60,000	

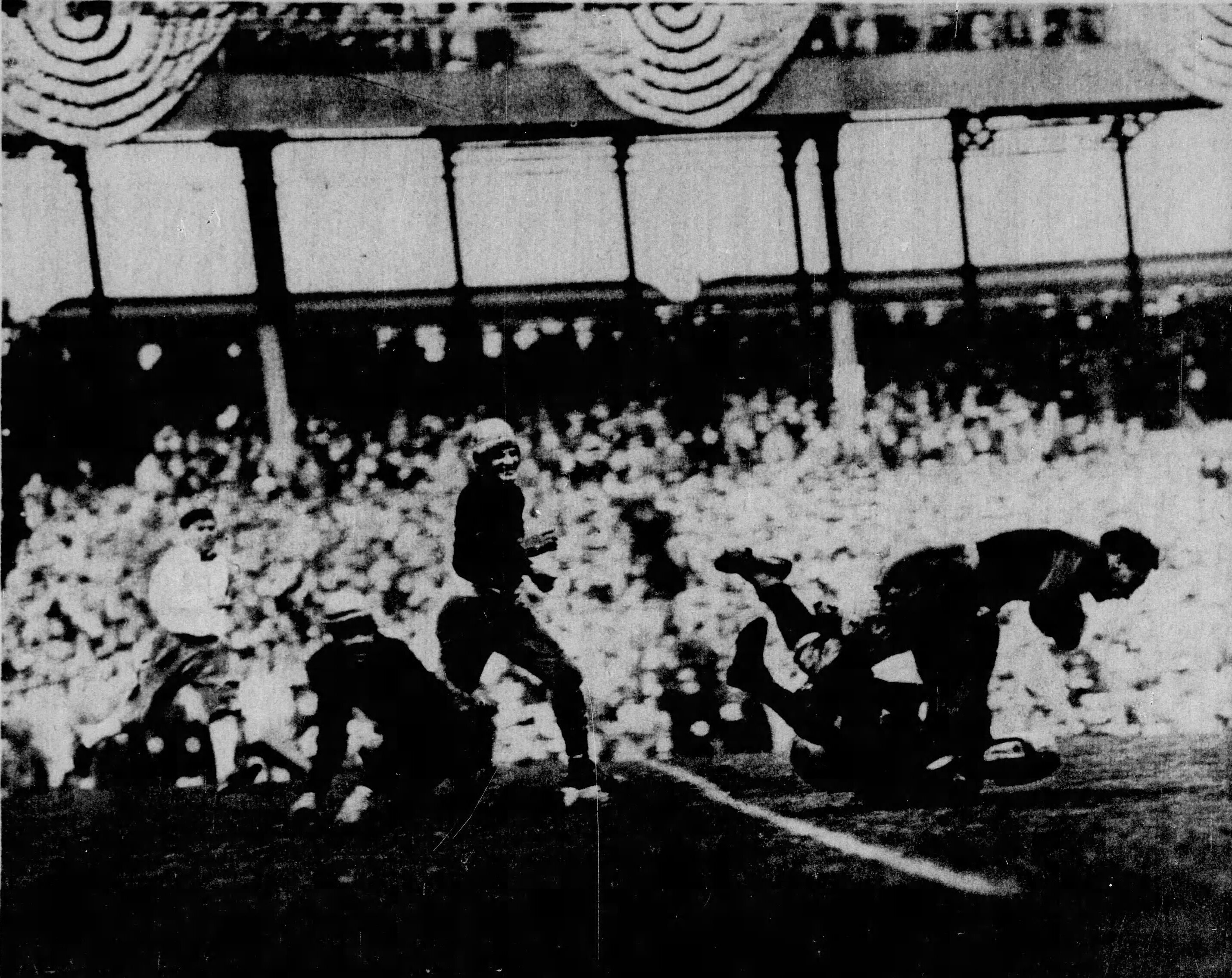
Notre Dame player being tackled by an Army player during the October 18 game at New York City's Polo Grounds

== Personnel ==
=== Depth chart ===
The following chart provides a visual depiction of Notre Dame's lineup during the 1924 season with games started at the position reflected in parentheses. The chart mimics a Notre Dame Box on offense.

LE
Chuck Collins ()
Clem Crowe
Larry Keefe
Clarence Reilly
–

LT	LG	C	RG	RT
Joe Bach ()	John Weibel ()	Adam Walsh ()	Noble Kizer ()	Edgar Miller ()
Joe Boland ()	Vince Harrington ()	Joe Harmon	Herb Eggert	John McManmon
John McMullan	Charles Glueckert	Russ Arndt	Joe Dienhart	
–				
–				

RE
Ed Hunsinger ()
Wilbur Eaton
Joe Maxwell
Joe Rigali
John Wallace

QB
Harry Stuhldreher ()
Frank Reese
Eddie Scharer
Red Edwards

RHB
Don Miller ()
Tom Hearden
Ward Connell
Gerry Miller
Joe Prelli

LHB
Jim Crowley ()
Max Houser
Bernie Coughlin
John Roach
Oswald Geniesse

FB
Elmer Layden ()
Bernie Livergood
Dick Hanousek
Bill Cerney
Harry O'Boyle

=== Line ===
Number	Player	Position	Games started	Hometown	High school	Height	Weight	Age
17	Joe Bach	Tackle		Chisholm, Minnesota				
27	Chuck Collins	End		Oak Park, Illinois				
12	Ed Hunsinger	End		Chillicothe, Ohio				
11	Noble Kizer	Guard		Plymouth, Indiana				
14	Edgar Miller	Tackle		Canton, Ohio				
4	Adam Walsh	Center		Hollywood, California	Hollywood	6'0"	190	
3	John Weibel	Guard		Erie, Pennsylvania				

=== Backfield ===
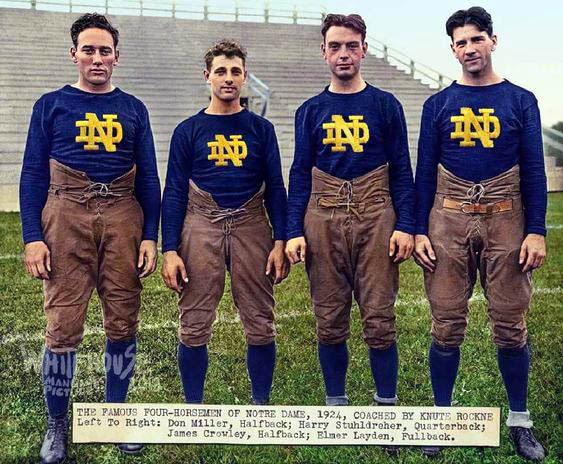
Notre Dame backfield, fltr: Don Miller, Harry Stuhldreher, Jim Crowley, and Elmer Layden

Number	Player	Position	Games started	Hometown	High school	Height	Weight	Age
18	Jim Crowley	halfback		Green Bay, Wisconsin	East	5' 11"	160	
5	Elmer Layden	fullback		Davenport, Iowa	Davenport	5' 11"	162	
16	Don Miller	halfback		Defiance, Ohio	Defiance	5' 11"	160	
32	Harry Stuhldreher	quarterback		Massillon, Ohio	Washington	5' 7"	151	

=== Subs ===
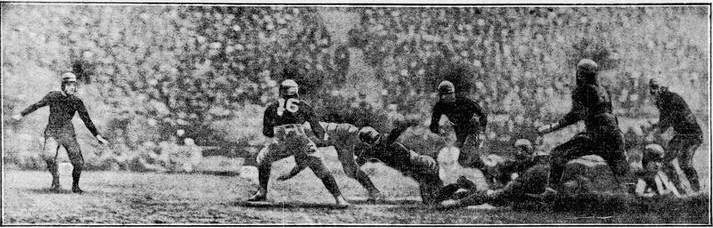
Game against Northwestern at Grant Park Memorial Stadium (today's Soldier Field) on November 22, 1924

Number	Player	Position	Games started	Hometown	High school	Height	Weight	Age
36	Russ Arndt	Center		Mishawaka, Indiana				
62	Joe Boland	Tackle		Philadelphia, Pennsylvania				
23	Bill Cerney	Fullback		Chicago, Illinois				
9	Doc Connell	Halfback		Beloit, Wisconsin				
43	Bernie Coughlin	Halfback		Waseca, Minnesota				
	Clem Crowe	End		Lafayette, Indiana				
38	Joe Dienhart	Guard		Lafayette, Indiana				
25	Red Edwards	Quarterback		Weston, West Virginia				
67	Herb Eggert	Guard		Chicago, Illinois				
21	Wilbur Eaton	End		Omaha, Nebraska				
49	Oswald Geniesse	Halfback		Green Bay, Wisconsin				
67	Charles Glueckert	Guard		South Bend, Indiana				
6	Vincent F. Harrington	Guard		Sioux City, Iowa				
2	Dick Hanousek	Fullback		Antigo, Wisconsin				
20	Joe Harmon	Center		Indianapolis, Indiana				
19	Tom Hearden	Halfback		Green Bay, Wisconsin				
47	Max Houser	Halfback		Mount Vernon, Washington				
1	Larry Keefe	End		Cortland, New York				
30	Bernie Livergood	Fullback		Stonington, Illinois				
8	Joe Maxwell	End		Philadelphia, Pennsylvania				
7	John McManmon	Tackle		Lowell, Massachusetts				
51	John McMullan	Tackle		Chicago, Illinois				
65	Gerry Miller	Halfback		Defiance, Ohio				
24	Harry O'Boyle	Fullback		Des Moines, Iowa				
22	Joe Prelli	Halfback		Brentwood, California				
31	Frank Reese	Quarterback		Robinson, Illinois				
44	Clarence Reilly	End		South Bend, Indiana				
57	Joe Rigali	End		Oak Park, Illinois				
	John Roach	Halfback		Appleton, Wisconsin				
33	Eddie Scharer	Quarterback		Toledo, Ohio				
46	John Wallace	End		Calumet City, Illinois				

=== Coaching staff ===
- Head coach: Knute Rockne
- Assistant coaches: Tom Lieb, Hunk Anderson (line coach)
- Freshman coach: George Keogan
- Assistant freshman coach: George Vergara
- Student manager: Leo Sutliffe
