= 1922 Marquette Hilltoppers football team =

American college football season

1922 Marquette Hilltoppers football
- Conference: Independent
- Record: 8–0–1
- Head coach: Frank Murray (1st season)

1922 Midwestern college football independents records
	Conf.			Overall
Team	W	L	T	W		L		T
Western State Normal		–		6	–	0	–	0
Bradley		–		9	–	0	–	1
Marquette		–		8	–	0	–	1
Central Michigan		–		6	–	0	–	2
Notre Dame		–		8	–	1	–	1
Butler		–		8	–	2	–	0
Haskell		–		8	–	2	–	0
Detroit		–		7	–	2	–	1
Michigan Mines		–		1	–	0	–	1
Wabash		–		7	–	3	–	0
St. Ignatius (OH)		–		4	–	1	–	3
Dayton		–		6	–	3	–	0
Saint Louis		–		6	–	3	–	1
Valparaiso		–		3	–	2	–	2
Baldwin–Wallace		–		4	–	3	–	1
DePauw		–		4	–	3	–	2
Michigan Agricultural		–		3	–	5	–	2
Earlham		–		2	–	6	–	0
Kent State		–		0	–	7	–	0

The 1922 Marquette Hilltoppers football team was an American football team that represented Marquette University as an independent during the 1922 college football season. In its first season under head coach Frank Murray, the team compiled an 8–0–1 record, shut out eight of its nine opponents, and outscored all opponents by a total of 213 to 3. It was Marquette's first of two consecutive undefeated seasons. During the combined 1922 and 1923 seasons, Marquette had a 16-0-1 record and shutout 13 of 16 opponents, giving up only 15 points.

Quarterback Red Dunn was the team's leader in both 1922 and 1923. He later played eight years in the National Football League and led the Chicago Cardinals and Green Bay Packers to NFL championships in 1925, 1929, 1930, and 1931.

== Schedule ==
Date	Opponent	Site	Result	Attendance	Source
September 30	Campion (WI)	Milwaukee, WI	W 52–0		
October 7	Ripon	Milwaukee, WI	T 0–0		
October 14	Carroll (WI)	Milwaukee, WI	W 26–0		
October 21	Chanute Field	Milwaukee, WI	W 50–0		
October 28	at Creighton	Omaha, NE	W 23–0	5,000	
November 4	Haskell	Milwaukee, WI	W 12–0		
November 11	North Dakota	Milwaukee, WI	W 6–0	5,000	
November 18	Detroit^{†}	Milwaukee, MI	W 6–3		
November 30	South Dakota	Milwaukee, WI	W 38–0		
^{†}Homecoming

== Game summaries ==
=== Haskell ===
On November 4, Marquette defeated the Haskell Indians, 12–0, in Milwaukee. Haskell held Marquette scoreless in the first half, but the Hilltoppers rallied in the second half. Quarterback Red Dunn kicked two field goals, one from the 25-yard line in the third quarter and the other from the 27-yard line in the fourth quarter. Leichtfuss carried the ball for a touchdown in the fourth quarter.

=== North Dakota ===
On November 11, Marquette defeated the North Dakota Flickertails, 6–0, before a crowd of 5,000 spectators in Milwaukee. Quarterback Red Dunn kicked field goals from the 15- and 30-yard lines to account for all of Marquette's points.

=== Detroit ===
On November 18, Marquette defeated the Detroit Titans, 6–3, in Marquette's homecoming game in Milwaukee. Quarterback Red Dunn place-kicked two field goals to account for all of Marquette's points.

=== North Dakota ===
On November 30, Marquette defeated the South Dakota Coyotes, 38–0, in Milwaukee. In a one-sided game, the Wisconsin State Journal credited Marquette quarterback Red Dunn for his "brilliant play", including two touchdown runs to increase his scoring total to 77 points on the season. Backup right end McNutt also scored two touchdowns, and backup quarterback Skemp and Nellis scored one touchdown each. The victory concluded "the most successful season in the school's history."
