= Saint Louis Billikens football =

American college football team

- First season: 1899
- Last season: 1949; 77 years ago
- Location: St. Louis, Missouri
- Stadium: Edward J. Walsh Memorial Stadium
- Colors: Blue and White
- Bowl record: 0–0–0 (–)

National championships
- Claimed: 0
- Unclaimed: 0

Conference championships
- 0

Division championships
- 0

The Saint Louis Billikens football team represented Saint Louis University in the sport of college football. The university fielded an intercollegiate squad from 1899 to 1949, going undefeated in 1901, 1904 and 1906. The final home game for the Billikens was on November 24, 1949, a 35–0 loss against Houston. Saint Louis finished the 1949 season with a 2–6–1 record. St. Louis competed at the club level during the late 1960s and early 1970s.

Although the school no longer has a football team, they made a lasting mark on the sport as the 1906 team, coached by Eddie Cochems, by throwing the first legal forward pass in college football history, Bradbury Robinson to Jack Schneider on September 5, 1906, vs. Carroll College at Waukesha, Wisconsin.

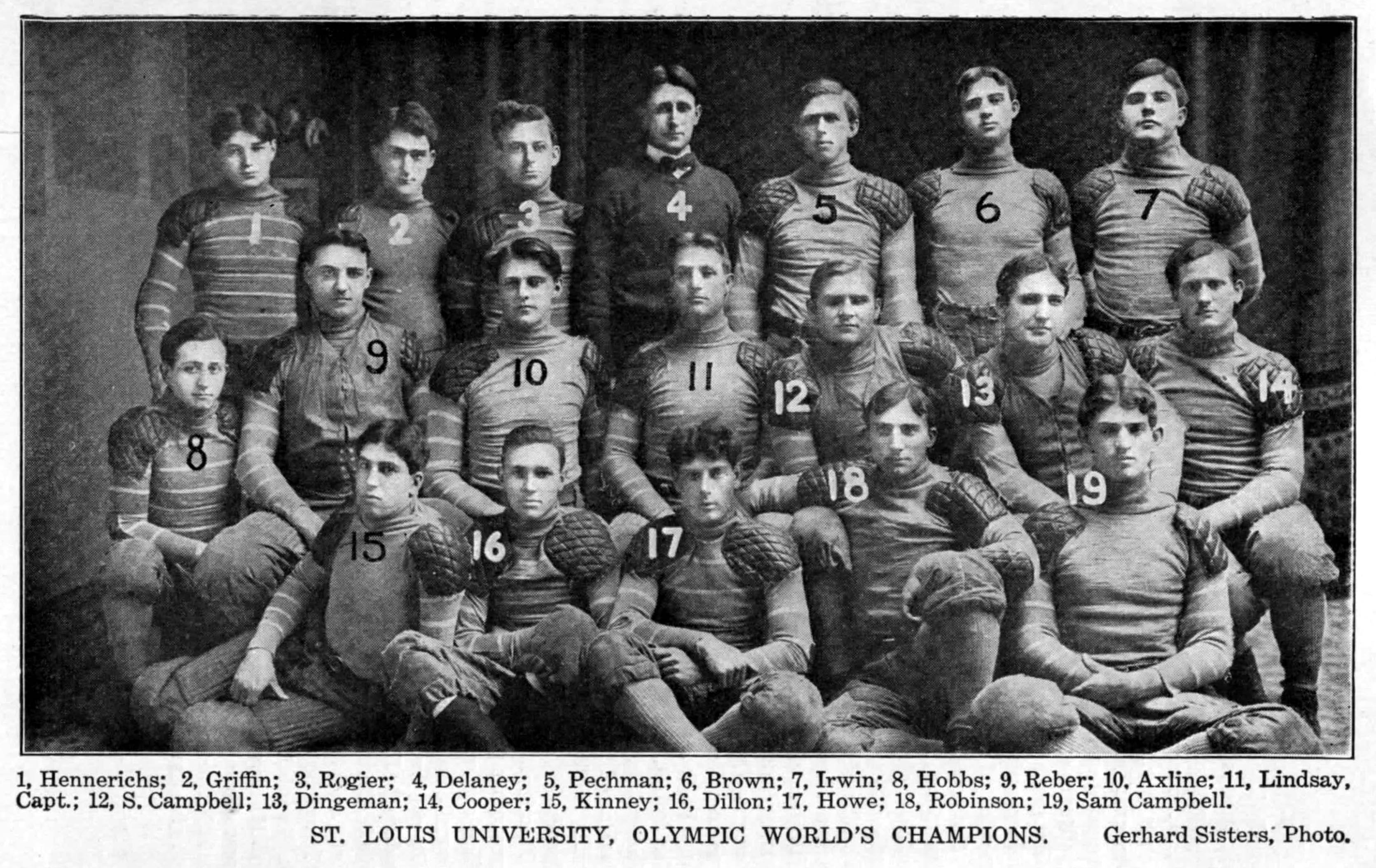
1904 team that participated (featured as a demonstration programme) at the Summer Olympics held in St. Louis

== Seasons ==
Year	Coach	Overall	Conference	Standing	Bowl/playoffs
Saint Louis Blue and White (Independent) (1899–1909)
1899	Martin Delaney	2–4–1			
1900	Martin Delaney	5–5			
1901	Martin Delaney	10–0			
1902	Martin Delaney	2–6–2			
1903	Martin Delaney	3–4–1			
1904	Martin Delaney	11–0			
1905	Tommy Dowd	7–2			
1906	Eddie Cochems	11–0			
1907	Eddie Cochems	7–3			
1908	Eddie Cochems	6–2–2			
1909	Bill Warner	3–5			
Saint Louis Billikens (Independent) (1910–1936)
1910	John R. Bender	7–2			
1911	John R. Bender	6–1–1			
1912	Frank Dennie	7–2			
1913	Frank Dennie	2–5			
1914	Frank Dennie	5–4			
1915	George Keogan	5–4–1			
1916	Erle V. Painter	4–4			
1917	Charles M. Rademacher	4–3–1			
1918	Ernest C. Quigley	3–2–1			
1919	Charles M. Rademacher	4–2–2			
1920	Charles M. Rademacher	3–6			
1921	Stephen G. O'Rourke	4–4–1			
1922	Stephen G. O'Rourke	6–3–1			
1923	Dan J. Savage	5–3–1			
1924	Dan J. Savage	6–3			
1925	Dan J. Savage	2–6–1			
1926	Robert L. Mathews	3–6			
1927	Robert L. Mathews	5–5			
1928	Hunk Anderson	4–4–1			
1929	Hunk Anderson	3–4–1			
1930	Chile Walsh	3–3–2			
1931	Chile Walsh	8–1			
1932	Chile Walsh	5–2			
1933	Chile Walsh	6–3			
1934	Cecil Muellerleile	3–3–2			
1935	Cecil Muellerleile	5–6			
1936	Cecil Muellerleile	5–4–1			
Saint Louis Billikens (Missouri Valley Conference) (1937–1939)
1937	Cecil Muellerleile	7–2–1	2–1	3rd	
1938	Cecil Muellerleile	3–5–2	1–1–1	4th	
1939	Cecil Muellerleile	5–3–2	1–2–1	5th	
Saint Louis Billikens (Independent) (1940)
1940	Dukes Duford	3–6–1			
Saint Louis Billikens (Missouri Valley Conference) (1941–1947)
1941	Dukes Duford	4–5–1	1–3–1	4th	
1942	Dukes Duford	4–5	2–3	T–3rd	
1943	No team World War II	—	—	—	
1944	No team World War II	—	—	—	
1945	Dukes Duford	5–4	0–1	5th	
1946	Dukes Duford	4–6	1–1	T–3rd	
1947	Dukes Duford	4–6	1–1	3rd	
1948	Joe Maniaci	4–7	0–2	5th	
1949	Joe Maniaci	2–6–1	0–3–1	7th	
Total:		55–12–26			

== See also ==
- Saint Louis Billikens
