= 1922 Michigan Agricultural Aggies football team =

American college football season

1922 Michigan Agricultural Aggies football
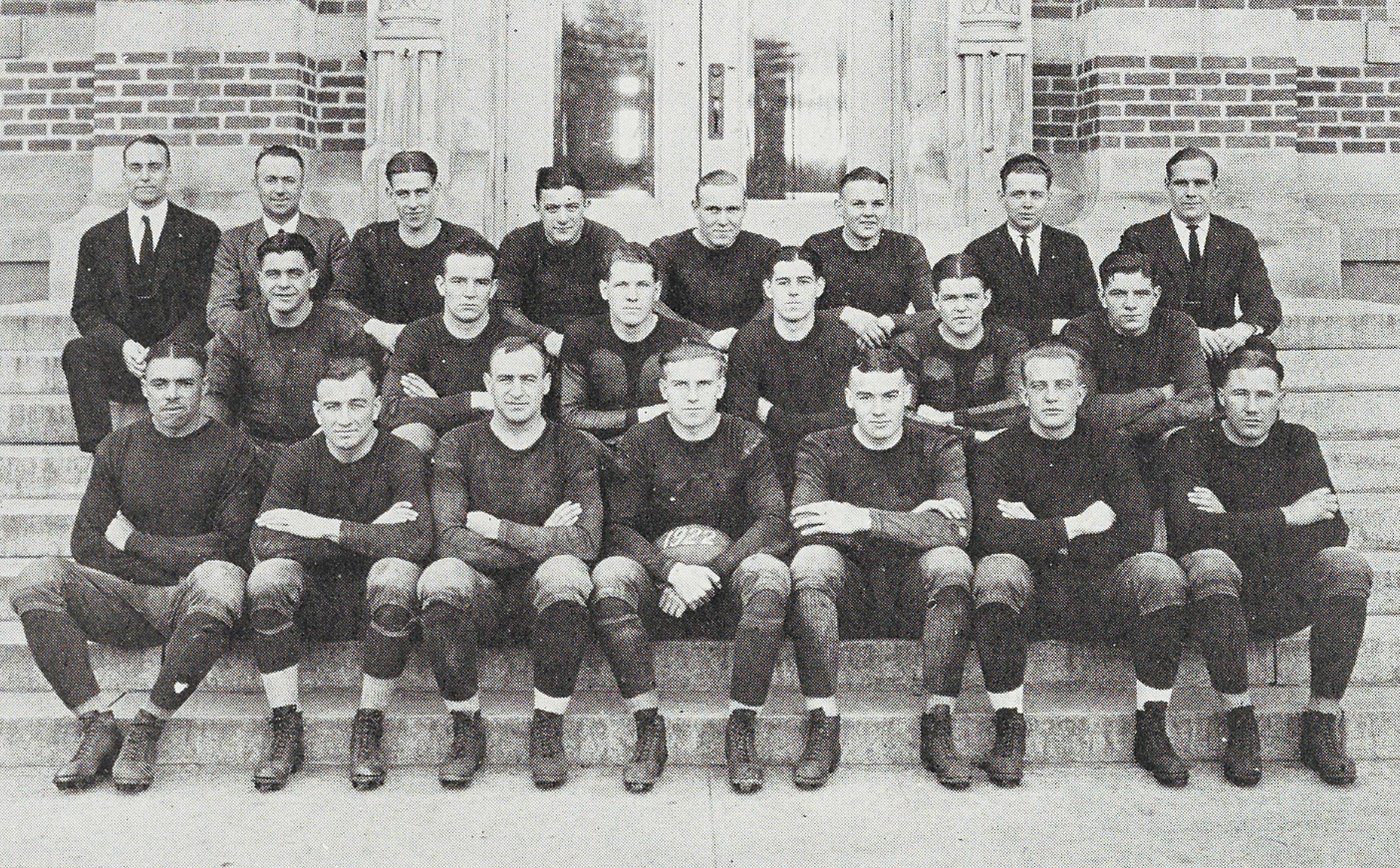
- Conference: Independent
- Record: 3–5–2
- Head coach: Albert Barron (2nd season)
- Captain: William C. Johnson
- Home stadium: College Field

1922 Midwestern college football independents records
	Conf.			Overall
Team	W	L	T	W		L		T
Western State Normal		–		6	–	0	–	0
Bradley		–		9	–	0	–	1
Marquette		–		8	–	0	–	1
Central Michigan		–		6	–	0	–	2
Notre Dame		–		8	–	1	–	1
Butler		–		8	–	2	–	0
Haskell		–		8	–	2	–	0
Detroit		–		7	–	2	–	1
Michigan Mines		–		1	–	0	–	1
Wabash		–		7	–	3	–	0
St. Ignatius (OH)		–		4	–	1	–	3
Dayton		–		6	–	3	–	0
Saint Louis		–		6	–	3	–	1
Valparaiso		–		3	–	2	–	2
Baldwin–Wallace		–		4	–	3	–	1
DePauw		–		4	–	3	–	2
Michigan Agricultural		–		3	–	5	–	2
Earlham		–		2	–	6	–	0
Kent State		–		0	–	7	–	0

The 1922 Michigan Agricultural Aggies football team represented Michigan Agricultural College (MAC) as an independent during the 1922 college football season. In their second and final year under head coach Albert Barron, the Aggies compiled a 3–5–2 record and were outscored by their opponents 135 to 111.

== Schedule ==
Date	Time	Opponent	Site	Result	Attendance	Source
September 30		Alma	College Field; East Lansing, MI	W 33–0		
October 7		Albion	College Field; East Lansing, MI	T 7–7		
October 14		at Wabash	Crawfordsville, IN	L 0–26		
October 21		South Dakota	College Field; East Lansing, MI	W 7–0		
October 28		at Indiana	Jordan Field; Bloomington, IN (rivalry)	L 6–14		
November 4		at Michigan	Ferry Field; Ann Arbor, MI (rivalry)	L 0–63	42,000	
November 11		Ohio Wesleyan	College Field; East Lansing, MI	L 6–9		
November 18		at Creighton	Creighton Stadium; Omaha, NE	L 0–9	7,000	
November 25		Massachusetts^{†}	College Field; East Lansing, MI	W 45–0		
November 30	2:00 p.m.	at Saint Louis	Sportsman's Park; St. Louis, MO	T 7–7	10,000	
^{†}Homecoming; All times are in Central time

== Game summaries ==
=== Michigan ===
Week 5: Michigan Agricultural at Michigan

Team	1	2	3	4	Total
Michigan Agricultural	0	0	0	0	0
• Michigan	14	19	9	21	63

- Date: November 4, 1922
- Location: Ferry Field
  Ann Arbor, MI
- Game attendance: 25,000–42,000
- Referee: Ray (Illinois)

On November 4, 1922, the Aggies lost to Michigan, 63–0. Lloyd Northard wrote in the Detroit Free Press that "not in the past 10 years has an Aggie team been so utterly out-classed in every department of the game." Fully embracing the passing game, Michigan threw 33 passes with 17 completions. Northard wrote that the game at times "more resembled basketball than football" and called it "the greatest exhibition of aerial play ever witnessed on Ferry Field," setting records for both passes thrown and completed.
