= 1922 South Dakota Coyotes football team =

American college football season

1922 South Dakota Coyotes football
- Conference: North Central Conference
- Record: 2–6–1 (0–2–1 NCC)
- Head coach: Stub Allison (1st season)

1922 North Central Conference football standings
	Conf.					Overall
Team	W		L		T	W		L		T
South Dakota State $	4	–	1	–	1	5	–	4	–	1
Creighton	3	–	1	–	0	7	–	2	–	1
North Dakota	3	–	1	–	0	3	–	3	–	0
St. Thomas (MN)	1	–	1	–	0	8	–	1	–	0
North Dakota Agricultural	1	–	2	–	0	6	–	2	–	0
Des Moines	0	–	1	–	1	4	–	2	–	1
Morningside	0	–	2	–	2	1	–	4	–	2
South Dakota	0	–	2	–	1	3	–	6	–	1
Nebraska Wesleyan	0	–	2	–	1	4	–	4	–	1
$ – Conference champion

The 1922 South Dakota Coyotes football team was an American football team that represented the University of South Dakota in the North Central Conference (NCC) during the 1922 college football season. In its first season under head coach Stub Allison, the team compiled a 2–6–1 record (0–2–1 against NCC opponents), tied for last place in the NCC, and was outscored by a total of 161 to 54.

== Schedule ==
Date	Time	Opponent	Site	Result	Attendance	Source
September 30		Yankton*	Vermillion, SD	W 7–0		
October 7		at Nebraska*	Nebraska Field; Lincoln, NE	L 0–66		
October 14		North Dakota	Vermillion, SD (rivalry)	L 0–7		
October 21		at Michigan Agricultural*	East Lansing, MI	L 0–7		
October 28		at South Dakota State	Brookings, SD (rivalry)	T 7–7		
November 4		at Creighton	Omaha, NE	L 6–12		
November 11		Dakota Wesleyan*	Vermillion, SD	W 34–0		
November 18	2:30 p.m.	at Saint Louis*	Sportsman's Park; St. Louis, MO	L 0–24	4,000	
November 30		at Marquette*	Milwaukee, WI	L 0–38		
*Non-conference game; All times are in Central time
