= 1922 Detroit Titans football team =

American college football season

1922 Detroit Titans football
- Conference: Independent
- Record: 7–2–1
- Head coach: James F. Duffy (5th season)
- Captain: Arthur P. "Patsy" McKenna
- Home stadium: University of Detroit Stadium

1922 Midwestern college football independents records
	Conf.			Overall
Team	W	L	T	W		L		T
Western State Normal		–		6	–	0	–	0
Bradley		–		9	–	0	–	1
Marquette		–		8	–	0	–	1
Central Michigan		–		6	–	0	–	2
Notre Dame		–		8	–	1	–	1
Butler		–		8	–	2	–	0
Haskell		–		8	–	2	–	0
Detroit		–		7	–	2	–	1
Michigan Mines		–		1	–	0	–	1
Wabash		–		7	–	3	–	0
St. Ignatius (OH)		–		4	–	1	–	3
Dayton		–		6	–	3	–	0
Saint Louis		–		6	–	3	–	1
Valparaiso		–		3	–	2	–	2
Baldwin–Wallace		–		4	–	3	–	1
DePauw		–		4	–	3	–	2
Michigan Agricultural		–		3	–	5	–	2
Earlham		–		2	–	6	–	0
Kent State		–		0	–	7	–	0

The 1922 Detroit Titans football team represented the University of Detroit as an independent during the 1922 college football season. In its fifth year under head coach James F. Duffy, Detroit compiled a 7–2–1 record and outscored its opponents by a combined total of 116 to 54. In addition to Duffy, the coaching staff included "Bingo" Brown (backfield coach), Pat Dwyer (line coach), and Harry Crowley (trainer).

The team played its home games at the new University of Detroit Stadium, built in 1922 at Livernois Avenue and Six Mile Road. The stadium was commonly known in 1922 as Dinan Field.

Quarterback Arthur P. "Patsy" McKenna was the team captain. Tackle Gus Sonnenberg, who went on to play eight seasons in the National Football League, was also a member of the team.

== Schedule ==
Date	Opponent	Site	Result	Attendance	Source
September 30	Wilmington (OH)	University of Detroit Stadium; Detroit, MI	W 7–0	5,000	
October 7	Duquesne	University of Detroit Stadium; Detroit, MI	W 34–0		
October 14	Des Moines	University of Detroit Stadium; Detroit, MI	W 9–6		
October 21	Boston College	University of Detroit Stadium; Detroit, MI	W 10–8		
October 28	at Springfield (MA)	Pratt Field; Springfield, MA	L 0–6	5,000	
November 4	Lombard	University of Detroit Stadium; Detroit, MI	T 6–6		
November 11	Haskell	University of Detroit Stadium; Detroit, MI	W 13–6		
November 18	at Marquette	Milwaukee, WI	L 3–6		
November 25	Washington & Jefferson	University of Detroit Stadium; Detroit, MI	W 20–9		
November 30	Vermont	University of Detroit Stadium; Detroit, MI	W 14–10		
