= Stephen G. O'Rourke =

American sports coach and baseball scout

Biographical details
- Born: September 13, 1893; Rochester, New York, U.S.
- Died: September 22, 1944 (aged 51); Denver, Colorado, U.S.

Playing career

Football
- 1907: Holy Cross

Basketball
- 1907–1908: Holy Cross

Coaching career (HC unless noted)

Football
- 1908–1910: Little Rock
- 1913–1914: St. Thomas (MN)
- 1915–1920: St. Mary's (KS)
- 1921–1922: Saint Louis
- 1923–1928: St. Mary's (KS)

Basketball
- 1921–1922: Saint Louis

Administrative career (AD unless noted)
- 1915–?: St. Mary's (KS)
- 1920?–193?: Detroit Tigers (scout)
- 1939–1944: New York Yankees (scout)

Head coaching record
- Overall: 70–54–8 (football)

Stephen Grover O'Rourke (April 26, 1887 – September 22, 1944) was an American football and basketball coach and Major League Baseball (MLB) scout. He served as the head football coach at Little Rock College in Little Rock, Arkansas from 1908 to 1910, the College of St. Thomas—now known as the University of St. Thomas—in Saint Paul, Minnesota from 1914 to 1915, St. Mary's College—now known as Saint Mary's Academy and College—in St. Marys, Kansas from 1915 to 1920 and again from 1934 to 1928, and Saint Louis University from 1931 to 1922.

O'Rourke became a scout for the Detroit Tigers in the 1920s and the New York Yankees in 1939. He died from a lingering heart ailment on September 22, 1944, at Saint Joseph Hospital in Denver.

== Head coaching record ==
=== Football ===
Year	Team	Overall	Conference	Standing	Bowl/playoffs
Little Rock Eagles (Independent) (1908–1910)
1908	Little Rock	0–1			
1909	Little Rock	4–1			
1910	Little Rock	2–5–1			
Little Rock:		6–7–1			
St. Thomas Cadets (Independent) (1913–1914)
1913	St. Thomas	4–0			
1914	St. Thomas	7–2			
St. Thomas:		11–2			
St. Mary's Knights (Kansas Collegiate Athletic Conference) (1915–1920)
1915	St. Mary's	3–5	1–4	13th	
1916	St. Mary's	4–3–1	2–3–1	10th	
1917	St. Mary's	6–3	4–2	T–4th	
1918	St. Mary's	1–1			
1919	St. Mary's	6–2	3–2	T–5th	
1920	St. Mary's	6–2	4–2	4th	
Saint Louis Billikens (Independent) (1921–1922)
1921	Saint Louis	4–4–1			
1922	Saint Louis	6–3–1			
Saint Louis:		10–7–2			
St. Mary's Knights (Kansas Collegiate Athletic Conference) (1923–1928)
1923	St. Mary's	4–4	3–4	11th	
1924	St. Mary's	3–4	2–4	13th	
1925	St. Mary's	4–3–1	3–3–1	T–8th	
1926	St. Mary's	2–5	2–5	T–12th	
1927	St. Mary's	4–3	4–3	8th	
1928	St. Mary's	2–3–3	2–2–3	6th	
St. Mary's:		43–38–5			
Total:		70–54–8			
