= 1922 Kalamazoo Baptists football team =

American college football season

1922 Kalamazoo Baptists football
- Conference: Michigan Intercollegiate Athletic Association
- Record: 4–4–1 (1–1–1 MIAA)
- Head coach: Ralph H. Young (6th season)

1922 Michigan Intercollegiate Athletic Association football standings
	Conf.					Overall
Team	W		L		T	W		L		T
Albion $	4	–	0	–	1	5	–	2	–	2
Alma	4	–	1	–	0	5	–	3	–	1
Kalamazoo	1	–	1	–	1	4	–	4	–	1
Michigan State Normal	1	–	2	–	0	3	–	2	–	2
Olivet	1	–	4	–	0	2	–	4	–	3
Hillsdale	0	–	3	–	0	3	–	5	–	0
$ – Conference champion

The 1922 Kalamazoo Baptists football team represented Kalamazoo College during the 1922 college football season. In Ralph H. Young's sixth year as head coach, Kalamazoo compiled a 4–4–1 record, and outscored their opponents 96 to 92.

== Schedule ==
Date	Opponent	Site	Result	Source
September 30	at Notre Dame*	Cartier Field; Notre Dame, IN	L 0–46	
October 14	Olivet	Kalamazoo, MI	W 33–6	
October 21	at Morningside*	Sioux City, IA	L 6–13	
October 28	Marietta*	Kalamazoo, MI	W 23–0	
November 4	St. Viator*	Kalamazoo, MI	W 7–0	
November 11	Valparaiso*	Kalamazoo, MI	W 21–15	
November 18	Alma	Kalamazoo, MI	L 0–2	
November 25	at Albion	Albion, MI	T 3–3	
November 30	at Lombard*	Galesburg, IL	L 3–7	
*Non-conference game
