= 1922 Central Michigan Normalites football team =

American college football season

1922 Central Michigan Normalites football
- Conference: Independent
- Record: 6–0–2
- Head coach: Wallace Parker (2nd season)
- Captain: Roland "Buss" Brown

1922 Midwestern college football independents records
	Conf.			Overall
Team	W	L	T	W		L		T
Western State Normal		–		6	–	0	–	0
Bradley		–		9	–	0	–	1
Marquette		–		8	–	0	–	1
Central Michigan		–		6	–	0	–	2
Notre Dame		–		8	–	1	–	1
Butler		–		8	–	2	–	0
Haskell		–		8	–	2	–	0
Detroit		–		7	–	2	–	1
Michigan Mines		–		1	–	0	–	1
Wabash		–		7	–	3	–	0
St. Ignatius (OH)		–		4	–	1	–	3
Dayton		–		6	–	3	–	0
Saint Louis		–		6	–	3	–	1
Valparaiso		–		3	–	2	–	2
Baldwin–Wallace		–		4	–	3	–	1
DePauw		–		4	–	3	–	2
Michigan Agricultural		–		3	–	5	–	2
Earlham		–		2	–	6	–	0
Kent State		–		0	–	7	–	0

The 1922 Central Michigan Normalites foindependents otball team represented Central Michigan Normal School, later renamed Central Michigan University, as an independent during the 1922 college football season. In their second season under head coach Wallace Parker, the Central Michigan football team compiled a 6–0–2 record, shut out six of eight opponents, and outscored all opponents by a combined total of 179 to 11. The team's victories included games with Ferris Institute (40–0), Grand Rapids Junior College (39–0), Northern State (62–0), Michigan Military Academy (7–0), Alma College (5–0), and Detroit Junior College (20–5). The team played the 1922 Michigan State Normal Normalites football team to a scoreless tie.

== Schedule ==
Date	Opponent	Site	Result	Source
September 30	Ferris Institute	Mount Pleasant, MI	W 40–0	
October 14	at Saint Ignatius High School	Cleveland, OH	T 6–6	
October 28	Grand Rapids	Mount Pleasant, MI	W 39–0	
November 4	at Michigan State Normal	Ypsilanti, MI (rivalry)	T 0–0	
November 11	Northern State Normal	Mount Pleasant, MI	W 62–0	
November 18	Michigan Military Academy	Mount Pleasant, MI	W 7–0	
November 23	Alma	Mount Pleasant, MI	W 5–0	
November 30	at Detroit Junior College	Codd Field; Detroit, MI	W 20–5	
