= Joe Cutting =

American football player and coach

Biographical details
- Born: January 20, 1885; Sleepy Eye, Minnesota, U.S.
- Died: October 4, 1971 (aged 86); Williston, North Dakota, U.S.

Playing career
- 1904–1906: Minnesota
- 1907: North Dakota Agricultural
- Position: Halfback

Coaching career (HC unless noted)
- 1908–1910: Washington (assistant)
- 1916–1921: Williston HS (ND)
- 1922: North Dakota Agricultural
- 1923–1935: Williston HS (ND)

Head coaching record
- Overall: 6–2 (college)

Accomplishments and honors

Awards
- All-Western (1905)

Joseph Patrick Cutting (January 20, 1885 – October 4, 1971) was an American college football player and coach and local politician. He earned All-Western honors as a halfback at the University of Minnesota in 1905 and later played at North Dakota Agricultural College—now known as North Dakota State University—under head coach Gil Dobie. He served as head football coach at North Dakota Agricultural in 1922.

Cutting coached football at Williston High School in Williston, North Dakota from 1916 to 1921 and again from 1923 to 1935. He operated a drug store in Williston, was a member of the Williston's city commission from 1941 to 1950, and was the mayor of the city from 1946 to 1950. Cutting died on October 4, 1971, in Williston.

== Head coaching record ==
=== College ===
| Year | Team | Overall | Conference | Standing | Bowl/playoffs |
|---|---|---|---|---|---|
North Dakota Agricultural Aggies (North Central Conference) (1922)
| 1922 | North Dakota Agricultural | 6–2 | 1–2 | 5th | |
| North Dakota Agricultural: | | 6–2 | 1–2 | | |
| Total: | | 6–2 | | | |
