= 1922 Creighton Blue and White football team =

American college football season

1922 Creighton Blue and White football
- Conference: North Central Conference
- Record: 7–2–1 (3–1 NCC)
- Head coach: Howard M. Baldrige (2nd season)

1922 North Central Conference football standings
	Conf.					Overall
Team	W		L		T	W		L		T
South Dakota State $	4	–	1	–	1	5	–	4	–	1
Creighton	3	–	1	–	0	7	–	2	–	1
North Dakota	3	–	1	–	0	3	–	3	–	0
St. Thomas (MN)	1	–	1	–	0	8	–	1	–	0
North Dakota Agricultural	1	–	2	–	0	6	–	2	–	0
Des Moines	0	–	1	–	1	4	–	2	–	1
Morningside	0	–	2	–	2	1	–	4	–	2
South Dakota	0	–	2	–	1	3	–	6	–	1
Nebraska Wesleyan	0	–	2	–	1	4	–	4	–	1
$ – Conference champion

The 1922 Creighton Blue and White football team was an American football team that represented Creighton University as member of the North Central Conference (NCC) during the 1922 college football season. In its second season under head coach Howard M. Baldrige, the team compiled a 7–2–1 record and outscored opponents by a total of 111 to 80. The team played its home games in Omaha, Nebraska.

== Schedule ==
Date	Opponent	Site	Result	Attendance	Source
September 30	Dakota Wesleyan*	Creighton Field; Omaha, NE	W 7–0		
October 7	Hamline*	Creighton Field; Omaha, NE	T 6–6		
October 14	Iowa Wesleyan*	Creighton Field; Omaha, NE	W 21–7		
October 21	at Des Moines	Des Moines, IA	W 6–0		
October 28	Marquette*	Creighton Field; Omaha, NE	L 0–23	5,000	
November 4	South Dakota	Omaha, NE	W 12–6		
November 11	Midland*	Omaha, NE	W 13–0		
November 18	Michigan Agricultural^{†}*	Creighton Stadium; Omaha, NE	W 9–0	7,000	
November 25	Nebraska Wesleyan	Omaha, NE	W 23–13		
November 30	South Dakota State	Omaha, NE	L 14–25		
*Non-conference game; ^{†}Homecoming
