= 1922 Western State Normal Hilltoppers football team =

American college football season

1922 Western State Normal Hilltoppers football
- Conference: Independent
- Record: 6–0
- Head coach: Milton Olander (1st season)
- Home stadium: Normal field

1922 Midwestern college football independents records
	Conf.			Overall
Team	W	L	T	W		L		T
Western State Normal		–		6	–	0	–	0
Bradley		–		9	–	0	–	1
Marquette		–		8	–	0	–	1
Central Michigan		–		6	–	0	–	2
Notre Dame		–		8	–	1	–	1
Butler		–		8	–	2	–	0
Haskell		–		8	–	2	–	0
Detroit		–		7	–	2	–	1
Michigan Mines		–		1	–	0	–	1
Wabash		–		7	–	3	–	0
St. Ignatius (OH)		–		4	–	1	–	3
Dayton		–		6	–	3	–	0
Saint Louis		–		6	–	3	–	1
Valparaiso		–		3	–	2	–	2
Baldwin–Wallace		–		4	–	3	–	1
DePauw		–		4	–	3	–	2
Michigan Agricultural		–		3	–	5	–	2
Earlham		–		2	–	6	–	0
Kent State		–		0	–	7	–	0

The 1922 Western State Normal Hilltoppers football team represented Western State Normal School (later renamed Western Michigan University) as an independent during the 1922 college football season. William H. Spaulding left as the team's head coach after the 1921 season and was replaced by Milton Olander, who had played college football under Robert Zuppke at Illinois. In their first season under Olander, the Hilltoppers compiled a perfect 6–0 record, shut out every opponent, and outscored opponents by a combined total of 160 to 0.

== Schedule ==
Date	Time	Opponent	Site	Result	Source
September 23	3:30 p.m.	Defiance	Normal field; Kalamazoo, MI	W 19–0	
October 7		at Valparaiso	Valparaiso, IN	W 7–0	
October 14	2:30 p.m.	Albion	Normal field; Kalamazoo, MI	W 10–0	
October 21	2:00 p.m.	Chicago YMCA College	Normal field; Kalamazoo, MI	W 13–0	
November 3		Notre Dame freshmen	Normal field; Kalamazoo, MI	W 44–0	
November 11		at Earlham	Reid Field; Richmond, IN	W 67–0	
All times are in Central time
