= Glen Carberry =

American football player (1896–1976)

Profile
- Position: End

Personal information
- Born: April 10, 1896; Ames, Iowa, U.S.
- Died: February 19, 1976 (aged 79); New York, New York, U.S.
- Listed height: 6 ft 0 in (1.83 m)
- Listed weight: 190 lb (86 kg)

Career information
- High school: Ames
- College: Notre Dame

Career history
- Buffalo All-Americans (1923); Buffalo Bisons (1924); Cleveland Bulldogs (1925)

Awards and highlights
- First-team All-Pro (1923)
- Stats at Pro Football Reference

Glen Michael "Judge" Carberry (April 10, 1896 – February 19, 1976), sometimes listed as Glenn Carberry, was an American football player and coach.

== Early years, military, and college ==
A native of Ames, Iowa, he played college football for Notre Dame and was captain of the 1922 Notre Dame Fighting Irish football team.

He also served in the infantry in World War I, attained the rank of lieutenant. After 11 months of service in France, he was injured in the explosion of an ammunition dump and was hospitalized for three weeks. He suffered a shattered ear drum.

== Professional football ==
He also played professional football in the National Football League (NFL) as an end for the Buffalo All-Americans in 1923, the Buffalo Bisons in 1924, and the Cleveland Bulldogs in 1925. He was selected by Guy Chamberlin to the 1923 All-Pro Team.

== Coaching career ==
Carberry was the head coach of the St. Bonaventure football team in 1924 and 1925. He then joined Jim Crowley's staff at Michigan Agricultural, serving as line coach. When Crowley moved to Fordham in 1933, Carberry followed and served as Fordham's line coach. At Fordham, Carberry helped developed the offensive line that became known as the Seven Blocks of Granite.

== Later life ==
After retiring from football, Carberry worked as an attorney for the Veterans Administration in New York. He retired in 1965. He died from respiratory failure in 1976 at age 79.
