= 1922 Haskell Indians football team =

American college football season

1922 Haskell Indians football
- Conference: Independent
- Record: 8–2
- Head coach: Dick Hanley (1st season)
- Captain: John Levi
- Home stadium: Haskell Field

1922 Midwestern college football independents records
	Conf.			Overall
Team	W	L	T	W		L		T
Western State Normal		–		6	–	0	–	0
Bradley		–		9	–	0	–	1
Marquette		–		8	–	0	–	1
Central Michigan		–		6	–	0	–	2
Notre Dame		–		8	–	1	–	1
Butler		–		8	–	2	–	0
Haskell		–		8	–	2	–	0
Detroit		–		7	–	2	–	1
Michigan Mines		–		1	–	0	–	1
Wabash		–		7	–	3	–	0
St. Ignatius (OH)		–		4	–	1	–	3
Dayton		–		6	–	3	–	0
Saint Louis		–		6	–	3	–	1
Valparaiso		–		3	–	2	–	2
Baldwin–Wallace		–		4	–	3	–	1
DePauw		–		4	–	3	–	2
Michigan Agricultural		–		3	–	5	–	2
Earlham		–		2	–	6	–	0
Kent State		–		0	–	7	–	0

The 1922 Haskell Indians football team was an American football team that represented the Haskell Institute (later renamed Haskell Indian Nations University) as an independent during the 1922 college football season. In its first season under head coach Dick Hanley, the team compiled an 8–2 record and outscored opponents by a total of 307 to 89. The victories included a 102–7 triumph over Kansas City University and a 12–0 loss against an undefeated Marquette team.

Fullback John Levi, also known as "Skee", was the team captain. Levi developed a reputation in 1922 as a strong punter, passer, and open field runner.

== Schedule ==
Date	Time	Opponent	Site	Result	Attendance	Source
September 30		Pittsburg Teachers	Haskell Field; Lawrence, KS	W 25–7		
October 7		at Friends	Wichita, KS	W 31–7		
October 14		Ottawa	Haskell Field; Lawrence, KS	W 24–0		
October 20		Kansas City University	Haskell Field; Lawrence, KS	W 102–7		
October 27		Fairmount	Haskell Field; Lawrence, KS	W 62–0		
November 4		at Marquette	Milwaukee, WI	L 0–12		
November 11		at Detroit	University of Detroit Stadium; Detroit, MI	L 3–13		
November 18		at Kansas State Normal	Emporia, KS	W 27–14		
November 30		at St. Xavier	Corcoran Field; Cincinnati, OH	W 12–9		
December 9	3:00 p.m.	vs. Baylor	Schwab Field; San Antonio, TX	W 21–20		
All times are in Central time
