= 1922 South Dakota State Jackrabbits football team =

American college football season

1922 South Dakota State Jackrabbits football

NCC champion
- Conference: North Central Conference
- Record: 6–2–1 (4–1–1 NCC)
- Head coach: Charles A. West (4th season)

1922 North Central Conference football standings
	Conf.					Overall
Team	W		L		T	W		L		T
South Dakota State $	4	–	1	–	1	5	–	4	–	1
Creighton	3	–	1	–	0	7	–	2	–	1
North Dakota	3	–	1	–	0	3	–	3	–	0
St. Thomas (MN)	1	–	1	–	0	8	–	1	–	0
North Dakota Agricultural	1	–	2	–	0	6	–	2	–	0
Des Moines	0	–	1	–	1	4	–	2	–	1
Morningside	0	–	2	–	2	1	–	4	–	2
South Dakota	0	–	2	–	1	3	–	6	–	1
Nebraska Wesleyan	0	–	2	–	1	4	–	4	–	1
$ – Conference champion

The 1922 South Dakota State Jackrabbits football team was an American football team that represented South Dakota State College in the North Central Conference (NCC) during the 1922 college football season. In its fourth season under head coach Charles A. West, the team compiled a 6–2–1 record and outscored opponents by a total of 214 to 57.

The NCC, officially known as the North Central Intercollegiate Conference, was formed shortly before the start of the 1922 season. The other members of the conference were the University of North Dakota, the University of South Dakota, North Dakota Agricultural College, St. Thomas College, Creighton College, Morningside College, and Des Moines University. South Dakota State won the inaugural NCIC championship.

Key players included O. Owens, an African-American halfback, Frank Coffey at center, Earl and Frank Welch in the backfield, Schutte at fullback, Bob Coffey at halfback, Backman at guard. Owens scored four touchdowns in the opening game of the season on runs of 60, 47, 35, and 25 yards.

== Schedule ==
Date	Opponent	Site	Result	Attendance	Source
September 30	Columbus College*	Brookings, SD	W 85–0		
	Northern Normal & Industrial*		W 12–0		
October 7	St. Thomas (MN)	Brookings, SD	W 12–0		
October 14	at Wisconsin*	Camp Randall Stadium; Madison, WI	L 6–20		
October 20	at North Dakota	Grand Forks, ND	L 6–16		
October 28	South Dakota	Brookings, SD (Hobo Day, rivalry)	T 7–7		
November 11	North Dakota Agricultural	Brookings, SD (rivalry)	W 13–0		
November 18	at Morningside	Sioux City, IA	W 48–0		
November 30	at Creighton	Omaha, NE	W 25–14		
*Non-conference game
