= Ray Mowe =

American baseball player (1889–1968)

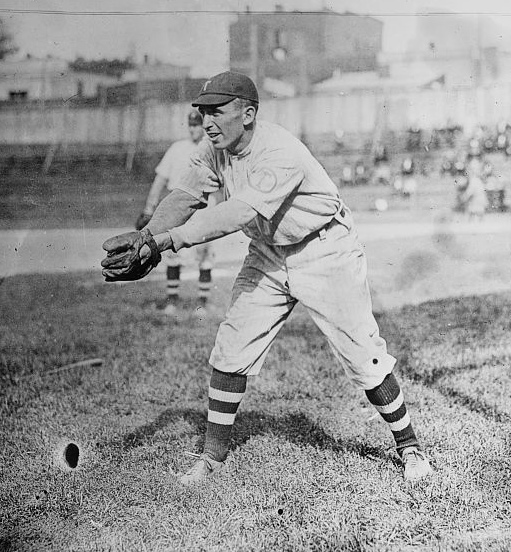
- Shortstop
- Born: July 12, 1889; Rochester, Indiana, U.S.
- Died: August 14, 1968 (aged 79); Sarasota, Florida, U.S.
- Batted: Left Threw: Right

MLB debut
- September 25, 1913, for the Brooklyn Superbas

Last MLB appearance
- October 3, 1913, for the Brooklyn Superbas

MLB statistics
- Batting average: .111
- Home runs: 0
- Runs batted in: 0
- Stats at Baseball Reference

Teams
- Brooklyn Superbas (1913)

Raymond Benjamin Mowe (July 12, 1889 – August 14, 1968) was an American professional baseball player who played shortstop in five games for the 1913 Brooklyn Dodgers. Mowe had 9 at-bats, 1 hit, 1 strike out, 1 time hit by pitch and 2 sacrifice hits.

As shortstop defensively he had 7 put outs, 8 assists, 1 error and 1 double play which resulted in a .941 fielding average. The regular shortstop for Brooklyn was Rabbit Maranville.

== Coaching career ==
Mowe served as the head football coach (1919–1922), head basketball coach (1917–1923), and head baseball coach (1918–1923) at Earlham College.

== Head coaching record ==
=== Football ===
Year	Team	Overall	Conference	Standing	Bowl/playoffs
Earlham Quakers (Independent) (1919–1921)
1919	Earlham	3–2			
1920	Earlham	2–3			
1921	Earlham	2–4–1			
Earlham Quakers (Indiana Intercollegiate Conference) (1922)
1922	Earlham	2–6			
Earlham:		9–15–1			
Total:		9–15–1			
