= 1922 Earlham Quakers football team =

American college football season

1922 Earlham Quakers football
- Conference: Independent
- Record: 2–6
- Head coach: Ray Mowe (4th season)
- Home stadium: Reid Field

1922 Midwestern college football independents records
	Conf.			Overall
Team	W	L	T	W		L		T
Western State Normal		–		6	–	0	–	0
Bradley		–		9	–	0	–	1
Marquette		–		8	–	0	–	1
Central Michigan		–		6	–	0	–	2
Notre Dame		–		8	–	1	–	1
Butler		–		8	–	2	–	0
Haskell		–		8	–	2	–	0
Detroit		–		7	–	2	–	1
Michigan Mines		–		1	–	0	–	1
Wabash		–		7	–	3	–	0
St. Ignatius (OH)		–		4	–	1	–	3
Dayton		–		6	–	3	–	0
Saint Louis		–		6	–	3	–	1
Valparaiso		–		3	–	2	–	2
Baldwin–Wallace		–		4	–	3	–	1
DePauw		–		4	–	3	–	2
Michigan Agricultural		–		3	–	5	–	2
Earlham		–		2	–	6	–	0
Kent State		–		0	–	7	–	0

The 1922 Earlham Quakers football team represented Earlham College during the 1922 college football season. Led by Ray Mowe in his fourth and final season as head coach, the Quakers compiled a record of 2–6. Earlham played home games at Reid Field in Richmond, Indiana.

== Schedule ==
Date	Time	Opponent	Site	Result	Attendance	Source
October 7		at Dayton	South Park; Dayton, OH	L 7–32		
October 14		Rose Poly	Reid Field; Richmond, IN	W 6–0		
October 21	2:30 p.m.	at Butler	Irwin Field; Indianapolis, IN	L 0–57	7,000	
October 28		Hanover	Reid Field; Richmond, IN	L 6–19		
November 4		at Muskingum	New Concord, OH	L 0–12		
November 11		Western State Normal	Reid Field; Richmond, IN	L 0–67		
November 18		Transylvania	Reid Field; Richmond, IN	W 25–0		
November 25		at Franklin (IN)	Goodell Field; Franklin, IN	L 0–27		
All times are in Central time
