= 1922 Butler Bulldogs football team =

American college football season

1922 Butler Bulldogs football
- Conference: Independent
- Record: 8–2
- Head coach: Harlan Page (3rd season)
- Captain: Harry Duttenhaver
- Home stadium: Irwin Field

1922 Midwestern college football independents records
	Conf.			Overall
Team	W	L	T	W		L		T
Western State Normal		–		6	–	0	–	0
Bradley		–		9	–	0	–	1
Marquette		–		8	–	0	–	1
Central Michigan		–		6	–	0	–	2
Notre Dame		–		8	–	1	–	1
Butler		–		8	–	2	–	0
Haskell		–		8	–	2	–	0
Detroit		–		7	–	2	–	1
Michigan Mines		–		1	–	0	–	1
Wabash		–		7	–	3	–	0
St. Ignatius (OH)		–		4	–	1	–	3
Dayton		–		6	–	3	–	0
Saint Louis		–		6	–	3	–	1
Valparaiso		–		3	–	2	–	2
Baldwin–Wallace		–		4	–	3	–	1
DePauw		–		4	–	3	–	2
Michigan Agricultural		–		3	–	5	–	2
Earlham		–		2	–	6	–	0
Kent State		–		0	–	7	–	0

The 1922 Butler Bulldogs football team represented Butler University as an independent during the 1922 college football season. Led by third-year head coach Harlan Page, the Bulldogs compiled a record of 8–2. Butler played home games at Irwin Field in Indianapolis.

== Schedule ==
Date	Time	Opponent	Site	Result	Attendance	Source
September 23		Wilmington (OH)	Irwin Field; Indianapolis, IN	W 6–0		
September 30		Franklin (IN)	Irwin Field; Indianapolis, IN	W 14–0		
October 7		Chicago YMCA College	Irwin Field; Indianapolis, IN	W 16–0		
October 14		at Illinois	Illinois Field; Champaign, IL	W 10–7	5,350	
October 21	2:30 p.m.	Earlham^{†}	Irwin Field; Indianapolis, IN	W 57–0	7,000	
October 28		Wabash	Irwin Field; Indianapolis, IN	W 9–7		
November 4		Rose Polytechnic	Irwin Field; Indianapolis, IN	W 19–0		
November 11		DePauw	Irwin Field; Indianapolis, IN	W 19–0		
November 18		Notre Dame	Irwin Field; Indianapolis, IN	L 3–31	12,000	
November 25		at Bethany (WV)	Wheeling, WV	L 7–29		
^{†}Homecoming; All times are in Central time
