= 1922 Saint Louis Billikens football team =

American college football season

1922 Saint Louis Billikens football
- Conference: Independent
- Record: 6–3–1
- Head coach: Stephen G. O'Rourke (2nd season)
- Home stadium: St. Louis University campus, Sportsman's Park

1922 Midwestern college football independents records
	Conf.			Overall
Team	W	L	T	W		L		T
Western State Normal		–		6	–	0	–	0
Bradley		–		9	–	0	–	1
Marquette		–		8	–	0	–	1
Central Michigan		–		6	–	0	–	2
Notre Dame		–		8	–	1	–	1
Butler		–		8	–	2	–	0
Haskell		–		8	–	2	–	0
Detroit		–		7	–	2	–	1
Michigan Mines		–		1	–	0	–	1
Wabash		–		7	–	3	–	0
St. Ignatius (OH)		–		4	–	1	–	3
Dayton		–		6	–	3	–	0
Saint Louis		–		6	–	3	–	1
Valparaiso		–		3	–	2	–	2
Baldwin–Wallace		–		4	–	3	–	1
DePauw		–		4	–	3	–	2
Michigan Agricultural		–		3	–	5	–	2
Earlham		–		2	–	6	–	0
Kent State		–		0	–	7	–	0

The 1922 Saint Louis Billikens football team was an American football team that represented Saint Louis University as an independent during the 1922 college football season. In their second and final season under head coach Stephen G. O'Rourke, the Billikens compiled a 6–3–1 record and outscored their opponents by a total of 152 to 82. The team played its home games at St. Louis University Athletic Field on the school's campus in St. Louis.

== Schedule ==
Date	Time	Opponent	Site	Result	Attendance	Source
September 30	3:00 p.m.	Cape Girardeau Normal	St. Louis University campus; St. Louis, MO	W 40–0	2,000	
October 7		at Notre Dame	Cartier Field; Notre Dame, IN	L 0–26	6,000–7,000	
October 14		Grinnell	Sportsman's Park; St. Louis, MO	L 0–26	5,000	
October 21	3:00 p.m.	Cumberland (TN)	Sportsman's Park; St. Louis, MO	W 30–7	2,500	
October 28	2:30 p.m.	Missouri	Sportsman's Park; St. Louis, MO	L 0–9	10,000	
November 4	2:30 p.m.	Missouri Mines	Sportsman's Park; St. Louis, MO	W 14–7	2,500	
November 11	2:30 p.m.	Dallas	Sportsman's Park; St. Louis, MO	W 14–0		
November 18	2:30 p.m.	South Dakota	Sportsman's Park; St. Louis, MO	W 24–0	4,000	
November 25		at Loyola (LA)	Heinemann Park; New Orleans, LA	W 28–0		
November 30	2:00 p.m.	Michigan Agricultural	Sportsman's Park; St. Louis, MO	T 7–7	10,000	
All times are in Central time
