= 1922 DePauw Tigers football team =

American college football season

1922 DePauw Tigers football
- Conference: Independent
- Record: 4–3–2
- Head coach: James N. Ashmore (1st season)

1922 Midwestern college football independents records
	Conf.			Overall
Team	W	L	T	W		L		T
Western State Normal		–		6	–	0	–	0
Bradley		–		9	–	0	–	1
Marquette		–		8	–	0	–	1
Central Michigan		–		6	–	0	–	2
Notre Dame		–		8	–	1	–	1
Butler		–		8	–	2	–	0
Haskell		–		8	–	2	–	0
Detroit		–		7	–	2	–	1
Michigan Mines		–		1	–	0	–	1
Wabash		–		7	–	3	–	0
St. Ignatius (OH)		–		4	–	1	–	3
Dayton		–		6	–	3	–	0
Saint Louis		–		6	–	3	–	1
Valparaiso		–		3	–	2	–	2
Baldwin–Wallace		–		4	–	3	–	1
DePauw		–		4	–	3	–	2
Michigan Agricultural		–		3	–	5	–	2
Earlham		–		2	–	6	–	0
Kent State		–		0	–	7	–	0

The 1922 DePauw Tigers football team represented DePauw University as an independent during the 1922 college football season. In James N. Ashmore's first season, the Tigers compiled a 4–3–2 record, and outscored their opponents 102 to 96.

== Schedule ==
Date	Opponent	Site	Result	Attendance	Source
September 30	Millikin	Greencastle, IN	W 30–0		
October 7	at Indiana	Jordan Field; Bloomington, IN	T 0–0		
October 14	Lake Forest	Greencastle, IN	W 7–6		
October 21	at Notre Dame	Cartier Field; Notre Dame, IN	L 7–34	5,000	
October 28	Valparaiso	Greencastle, IN	T 0–0		
November 4	Kenyon	Greencastle, IN	W 34–7		
November 11	at Butler	Indianapolis, IN	L 0–19		
November 18	Hanover	Greencastle, IN	W 24–0		
November 25	vs. Wabash	Indianapolis, IN	L 0–30		
