= 1922 North Dakota Flickertails football team =

American college football season

1922 North Dakota Flickertails football
- Conference: North Central Conference
- Record: 4–3 (3–1 NCC)
- Head coach: Paul J. Davis (4th season)

1922 North Central Conference football standings
	Conf.					Overall
Team	W		L		T	W		L		T
South Dakota State $	4	–	1	–	1	5	–	4	–	1
Creighton	3	–	1	–	0	7	–	2	–	1
North Dakota	3	–	1	–	0	3	–	3	–	0
St. Thomas (MN)	1	–	1	–	0	8	–	1	–	0
North Dakota Agricultural	1	–	2	–	0	6	–	2	–	0
Des Moines	0	–	1	–	1	4	–	2	–	1
Morningside	0	–	2	–	2	1	–	4	–	2
South Dakota	0	–	2	–	1	3	–	6	–	1
Nebraska Wesleyan	0	–	2	–	1	4	–	4	–	1
$ – Conference champion

The 1922 North Dakota Flickertails football team, also known as the Nodaks, was an American football team that represented the University of North Dakota in the North Central Conference (NCC) during the 1922 college football season. In its fourth year under head coach Paul J. Davis, the team compiled a 4–3 record (3–1 against NCC opponents), finished in third place out of nine teams in the NCC, and outscored opponents by a total of 49 to 40.

== Schedule ==
Date	Opponent	Site	Result	Attendance	Source
	Grand Forks American Legion*	Grand Forks, ND	W 30–6		
October 7	at Minnesota*	Northrop Field; Minneapolis, MN	L 0–22	10,000	
October 14	at South Dakota	Vermillion, SD (rivalry)	W 7–0		
October 20	South Dakota State	Grand Forks, ND	W 16–6		
October 28	St. Thomas (MN)	Grand Forks, ND	L 0–6		
November 4	at North Dakota Agricultural	Fargo, ND (rivalry)	W 7–0		
November 11	at Marquette*	Milwaukee, WI	L 0–6	5,000	
*Non-conference game
