= 1922 North Dakota Agricultural Aggies football team =

American college football season

1922 North Dakota Agricultural Aggies football
- Conference: North Central Conference
- Record: 6–2 (1–2 NCC)
- Head coach: Joe Cutting (1st season)
- Captain: Louis Duerner
- Home stadium: Dacotah Field

1922 North Central Conference football standings
	Conf.					Overall
Team	W		L		T	W		L		T
South Dakota State $	4	–	1	–	1	5	–	4	–	1
Creighton	3	–	1	–	0	7	–	2	–	1
North Dakota	3	–	1	–	0	3	–	3	–	0
St. Thomas (MN)	1	–	1	–	0	8	–	1	–	0
North Dakota Agricultural	1	–	2	–	0	6	–	2	–	0
Des Moines	0	–	1	–	1	4	–	2	–	1
Morningside	0	–	2	–	2	1	–	4	–	2
South Dakota	0	–	2	–	1	3	–	6	–	1
Nebraska Wesleyan	0	–	2	–	1	4	–	4	–	1
$ – Conference champion

The 1922 North Dakota Agricultural Bison football team was an American football team that represented North Dakota Agricultural College (now known as North Dakota State University) in the North Central Conference (NCC) during the 1922 college football season. In its first and only season under head coach Joe Cutting, the team compiled a 6–2 record (1–2 against NCC opponents) and finished in fifth place out of nine teams in the NCC. The team played its home games at Dacotah Field in Fargo, North Dakota.

== Schedule ==
Date	Opponent	Site	Result	Source
	Fargo American Legion*	Dacotah Field; Fargo, ND	W 54–0	
October 14	Jamestown*	Dacotah Field; Fargo, ND	W 48–0	
October 21	Montana State*	Dacotah Field; Fargo, ND	W 54–0	
October 28	at Concordia (MN)*	Moorhead, MN	W 55–7	
November 4	North Dakota	Fargo, ND (rivalry)	L 0–7	
November 11	at South Dakota State	Sioux Falls, SD (rivalry)	L 0–13	
November 18	at Superior Normal*	Superior, WI	W 6–0	
November 30	at Morningside	Sioux City, IA	W 27–10	
*Non-conference game
