= 1922 Michigan State Normal Normalites football team =

American college football season

1922 Michigan State Normal Normalites football
- Conference: Michigan Intercollegiate Athletic Association
- Record: 3–2–2 (1–2 MIAA)
- Head coach: Joseph McCulloch (2nd season)
- Captain: Percy R. Pray

1922 Michigan Intercollegiate Athletic Association football standings
	Conf.					Overall
Team	W		L		T	W		L		T
Albion $	4	–	0	–	1	5	–	2	–	2
Alma	4	–	1	–	0	5	–	3	–	1
Kalamazoo	1	–	1	–	1	4	–	4	–	1
Michigan State Normal	1	–	2	–	0	3	–	2	–	2
Olivet	1	–	4	–	0	2	–	4	–	3
Hillsdale	0	–	3	–	0	3	–	5	–	0
$ – Conference champion

The 1922 Michigan State Normal Normalites football team represented Michigan State Normal College (later renamed Eastern Michigan University) during the 1922 college football season. In their second and final season under head coach Joseph McCulloch, the Normalites compiled a record of 3–2–2 (1–2 against Michigan Intercollegiate Athletic Association opponents) and outscored all opponents by a combined total of 31 to 28. Percy R. Pray was the team captain.

== Schedule ==
Date	Opponent	Site	Result
October 7	at Assumption (ON)*	Windsor, ON	W 13–0
October 14	at Grand Rapids*	Grand Rapids, MI	W 12–0
October 21	at Alma	Alma, MI	L 0–14
October 28	Detroit Junior College*	Ypsilanti, MI	T 0–0
November 4	Central Michigan*	Ypsilanti, MI (rivalry)	T 0–0
November 11	Olivet	Ypsilanti, MI	W 6–0
November 18	Albion	Ypsilanti, MI	L 0–14
*Non-conference game
