= 1922 Bradley Indians football team =

American college football season

1922 Bradley Indians football
- Conference: Independent
- Record: 9–0–1
- Head coach: Alfred J. Robertson (3rd season)
- Captain: Golden Babcock

1922 Midwestern college football independents records
	Conf.			Overall
Team	W	L	T	W		L		T
Western State Normal		–		6	–	0	–	0
Bradley		–		9	–	0	–	1
Marquette		–		8	–	0	–	1
Central Michigan		–		6	–	0	–	2
Notre Dame		–		8	–	1	–	1
Butler		–		8	–	2	–	0
Haskell		–		8	–	2	–	0
Detroit		–		7	–	2	–	1
Michigan Mines		–		1	–	0	–	1
Wabash		–		7	–	3	–	0
St. Ignatius (OH)		–		4	–	1	–	3
Dayton		–		6	–	3	–	0
Saint Louis		–		6	–	3	–	1
Valparaiso		–		3	–	2	–	2
Baldwin–Wallace		–		4	–	3	–	1
DePauw		–		4	–	3	–	2
Michigan Agricultural		–		3	–	5	–	2
Earlham		–		2	–	6	–	0
Kent State		–		0	–	7	–	0

The 1922 Bradley Indians football team was an American football team that represented Bradley Polytechnic Institute (now known as Bradley University) as an independent during the 1922 college football season. In Alfred J. Robertson's third season as head coach, the team compiled an undefeated record of 9–0–1 and outscored opponents by a total of 243 to 33.

The team was recognized as a co-champion with Lombard among the minor college football teams in Illinois. After the season ended, the school applied for admission to the Illinois Intercollegiate Athletic Conference (IIAC), and the application was unanimously approved.

Key players included halfback Bunny Gross who was called "one of the fastest football players who ever donned a uniform at Bradley." Fullback Golden Babcock was the team captain. Leo Johnson was the assistant coach.

== Schedule ==
Date	Opponent	Site	Result	Attendance	Source
September 30	Lincoln (IL)	Peoria, IL	W 60–6		
October 6	at Lombard	Galesburg, IL	T 6–6		
October 14	St. Viator	Peoria, IL	W 16–0		
October 21	at Illinois College	Jacksonville, IL	W 6–0		
October 28	Illinois State	Peoria, IL	W 20–3		
November 4	Illinois Wesleyan	Peoria, IL	W 26–0	4,500	
November 11	at Augustana (IL)	Erickson Field; Rock Island, IL	W 34–0		
November 18	Lake Forest	Peoria, IL	W 26–6	4,500	
November 25	Carthage	Peoria, IL	W 7–6		
November 30	Eureka	Peoria, IL	W 42–6		
