= 1922 Kent State Silver Foxes football team =

American college football season

1922 Kent State Silver Foxes football
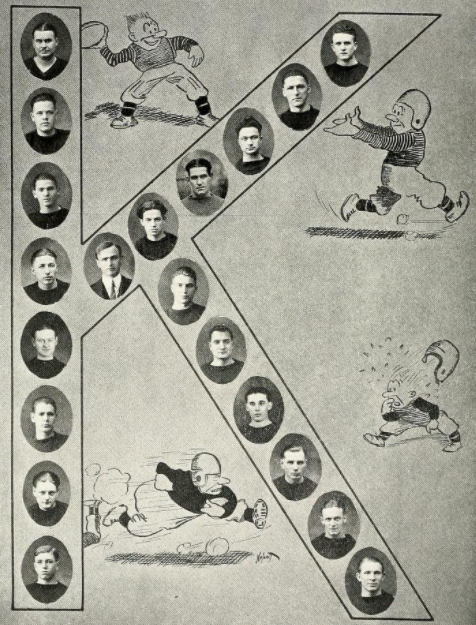
- Conference: Independent
- Record: 0–7
- Head coach: Paul G. Chandler (3rd season)
- Captain: Paul Spangler
- Home stadium: Rockwell Field

1922 Midwestern college football independents records
	Conf.			Overall
Team	W	L	T	W		L		T
Western State Normal		–		6	–	0	–	0
Bradley		–		9	–	0	–	1
Marquette		–		8	–	0	–	1
Central Michigan		–		6	–	0	–	2
Notre Dame		–		8	–	1	–	1
Butler		–		8	–	2	–	0
Haskell		–		8	–	2	–	0
Detroit		–		7	–	2	–	1
Michigan Mines		–		1	–	0	–	1
Wabash		–		7	–	3	–	0
St. Ignatius (OH)		–		4	–	1	–	3
Dayton		–		6	–	3	–	0
Saint Louis		–		6	–	3	–	1
Valparaiso		–		3	–	2	–	2
Baldwin–Wallace		–		4	–	3	–	1
DePauw		–		4	–	3	–	2
Michigan Agricultural		–		3	–	5	–	2
Earlham		–		2	–	6	–	0
Kent State		–		0	–	7	–	0

The 1922 Kent State Silver Foxes football team represented Kent State during the 1922 college football season. In its third season of intercollegiate football, all under head coach Paul G. Chandler, the team compiled a 0–7 record and was outscored by a total of 146 to 0. In three seasons under coach Chandler, Kent State did not score a point or win a game on the field, the sole victory coming by forfeit in 1920. Paul Spangler was the team's captain.

== Schedule ==
Date	Opponent	Site	Result	Source
September 23	at Hiram	Hiram, OH	L 0–14	
September 30	at Mount Union	Alliance, OH	L 0–32	
October 7	at St. Ignatius	Cleveland, OH	L 0–34	
October 14	Ashland	Rockwell Field; Kent, OH	L 0–14	
October 21	at Baldwin Wallace	Berea, OH	L 0–32	
November 4	Indiana (PA)	Rockwell Field; Kent, OH	L 0–14	
November 11	Bowling Green	Rockwell Field; Kent, OH (rivalry, Armistice Day)	L 0–6	
