= Joseph McCulloch =

American sports coach and athletics director

Biographical details
- Born: April 5, 1886; New York, New York, U.S.
- Died: December 15, 1960 (aged 74); St. Petersburg, Florida, U.S.

Playing career

Football
- c. 1908–1910: Springfield)

Baseball
- c. 1908–1910: Springfield

Coaching career (HC unless noted)

Football
- 1921–1922: Michigan State Normal

Basketball
- c. 1911–1918: Carnegie Tech
- 1921–1925: Michigan State Normal

Baseball
- c. 1911–1918: Carnegie Tech
- 1923–1925: Michigan State Normal

Administrative career (AD unless noted)
- c. 1911–1918: Carnegie Tech
- 1931–1947: Michigan State Normal

Head coaching record
- Overall: 6–5–2 (football)

Joseph Howard McCulloch (April 5, 1886 – December 15, 1960) was an American football, baseball, and basketball coach, teacher and athletic director. He played college football and baseball at Springfield College from 1908 to 1910. He was the athletic director and coach of the baseball and basketball teams at Carnegie Institute of Technology—now known as Carnegie Mellon University—from 1911 to 1918. After service in the military during World War I, he spent more than 30 years from 1919 through the mid-1950s as the athletic director at Michigan State Normal College—now known as Eastern Michigan University—and served stints as the head coach of the football, basketball and tennis teams.

== Early years ==
McCulloch was born in the State of New York in approximately 1887. His father was an immigrant from Scotland. McCulloch attended Springfield College in Springfield, Massachusetts. He was the captain of the Springfield College football and baseball teams in 1909 and 1910.

== Coaching career ==
From approximately 1911 to 1918, McCulloch was professor, athletic director and coach of the basketball and baseball teams at Carnegie Institute of Technology (now known as Carnegie Mellon University). In March 1918, he was also placed in charge of "soldiers' sports" at Carnegie Tech.

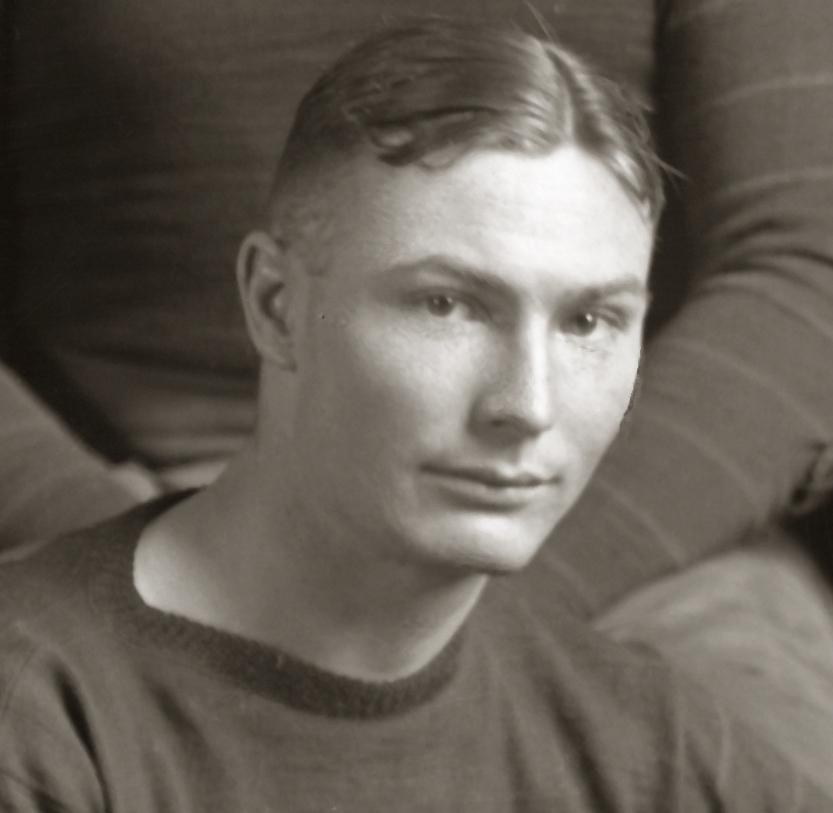
In 1918, McCulloch coached All-American Archie Weston.

McCulloch's coaching career was interrupted during World War I when he served in the United States armed forces. As of September 1918, McCulloch was serving as an assistant flight officer with the rank of lieutenant at Chanute Aviation Field (later renamed Chanute Air Force Base) in Rantoul, Illinois. He was also named as the coach of the base football team that included stars including former All-American Archie Weston from Michigan, future All-American Jim Reynolds from Georgia, Kofed of Carnegie Tech, and Mackall of Virginia.

After being discharged from the military in 1919, McCulloch was hired as the football, baseball and tennis coach at Michigan State Normal College located in Ypsilanti, Michigan. He was the head basketball coach for the Normalites—now called the Eastern Michigan Eagles—from 1921 to 1925 and head football coach during the 1921 and 1922 seasons. His coaching record for the football program was 6–5–2. At the time of the 1920 U.S. Census, McCulloch was living in Ypsilanti, and his occupation was identified as the "athletic supervisor" at a school.

== Later years and family ==
McCulloch retired from coaching at Michigan State Normal College in 1936, but he remained the school's athletic director for another 20 years. At the time of the 1930 U.S. Census, McCulloch remained in Ypsilanti, and his occupation was listed as a teacher at the Normal College. In 1951, the press reported on rumors that Michigan State Normal's football players had been "doped" with novocain to allow them to play through injuries. McCulloch, who was the head of the athletic department and a member of the school's board of athletic control, denied the rumors and told reporters, "We want to know who started these rumors."

McCulloch was married to Katharine P. McCulloch in approximately 1913. They had two sons, Rudolph (born in Illinois in approximately 1914), Joseph Howard, Jr. (born in Pennsylvania in approximately 1915), and George M. (born in Michigan in approximately 1922), and a daughter, Charlotte Morrison (born in Illinois in approximately 1919).

McCulloch died in December 1960 at age 74.

== Head coaching record ==
=== Football ===
Year	Team	Overall	Conference	Standing	Bowl/playoffs
Michigan State Normal Normalites (Michigan Intercollegiate Athletic Association) (1921–1922)
1921	Michigan State Normal	3–3	1–2	4th	
1922	Michigan State Normal	3–2–2	1–2	4th	
Michigan State Normal:		6–5–2	4–2		
Total:		6–5–2			
