= 1922 University of Dayton football team =

American college football season

1922 Dayton football
- Conference: Independent
- Record: 6–3
- Head coach: Van F. Hill (1st season)
- Home stadium: Varsity Field

1922 Midwestern college football independents records
	Conf.			Overall
Team	W	L	T	W		L		T
Western State Normal		–		6	–	0	–	0
Bradley		–		9	–	0	–	1
Marquette		–		8	–	0	–	1
Central Michigan		–		6	–	0	–	2
Notre Dame		–		8	–	1	–	1
Butler		–		8	–	2	–	0
Haskell		–		8	–	2	–	0
Detroit		–		7	–	2	–	1
Michigan Mines		–		1	–	0	–	1
Wabash		–		7	–	3	–	0
St. Ignatius (OH)		–		4	–	1	–	3
Dayton		–		6	–	3	–	0
Saint Louis		–		6	–	3	–	1
Valparaiso		–		3	–	2	–	2
Baldwin–Wallace		–		4	–	3	–	1
DePauw		–		4	–	3	–	2
Michigan Agricultural		–		3	–	5	–	2
Earlham		–		2	–	6	–	0
Kent State		–		0	–	7	–	0

The 1922 Dayton football team was an American football team that represented the University of Dayton as an independent during the 1922 college football season. In its first and only season under head coach Van F. Hill, the team compiled a 6–3 record.

== Schedule ==
Date	Opponent	Site	Result	Source
September 30	Cedarville	South Park; Dayton, OH	W 59–0	
October 7	Earlham	South Park; Dayton, OH	W 32–7	
October 14	at St. Xavier	Corcoran Field; Cincinnati, OH	L 13–46	
October 21	at Rose Poly	Terre Haute, IN	W 32–0	
October 28	at Canisius	Buffalo, NY	L 6–41	
November 4	St. Ignatius	Dunn Field; Cleveland, OH	W 20–13	
November 11	Baldwin-Wallace^{†}	South Park; Dayton, OH	W 36–14	
November 18	at Wilmington	Wilmington, OH	L 0–3	
November 25	Defiance	South Park; Dayton, OH	W 41–0	
^{†}Homecoming
