= John Weibel =

American football player, coach, and medical doctor (1904–1931)

Biographical details
- Born: March 13, 1904; Erie, Pennsylvania, U.S.
- Died: February 17, 1931 (aged 26); Pittsburgh, Pennsylvania, U.S.

Playing career
- 1923–1924: Notre Dame
- Position: Guard

Coaching career (HC unless noted)
- 1925–1926: Vanderbilt (line)
- 1927: Duquesne (assistant)

Accomplishments and honors

Championships
- National (1924)

John D. Weibel (March 13, 1904 – February 17, 1931) was a college football player and coach and medical doctor.

== College football ==
=== Playing ===
==== Notre Dame ====
At Notre Dame, Weibel was one of the "Seven mules" (left guard) who blocked for the Four Horsemen.

=== Coaching ===
==== Vanderbilt ====
Weibel was assistant grid coach and scout under Dan McGugin for 2 years at Vanderbilt while also attending Vanderbilt Medical School.

==== Duquesne ====
Starting in September 1927, Weibel was first assistant and line coach at Duquesne under fellow Notre Dame teammate and 4 horseman Elmer Layden while completing his medical internship at Mercy Hospital in Pittsburgh.

== Death ==
He died February 17, 1931, in Pittsburgh from peritonitis after contracting appendicitis. Notre Dame coach Knute Rockne "often said Weibel was one of the principal factors in the success of the 'Horseman.'"
