= Max Houser =

American football player and coach (1898–1928)

Biographical details
- Born: 1898
- Died: August 5, 1928; Mission Beach, California, U.S.
- Education: Notre Dame (1925, LLB)

Playing career

Football
- 1923–1924: Notre Dame
- Position: End

Coaching career (HC unless noted)

Football
- 1925: Midland
- 1926: Redlands
- 1927: Army and Navy Academy (CA)

Basketball
- 1925–1926: Midland

Head coaching record
- Overall: 6–13 (college football)

Max Houser (1898 – August 5, 1928) was an American football player and coach. He served as the head football coach at the Midland College—now known as Midland University—in Fremont, Nebraska, in 1925, the University of Redlands, in Redlands, California, in 1926, and Army and Navy Academy High School, in San Diego, in 1927. Houser died from drowning in 1928.

== Head coaching record ==
=== College ===
Year	Team	Overall	Conference	Standing	Bowl/playoffs
Midland Warriors (Nebraska College Athletic Conference) (1925)
1926	Midland	6–4	6–1	T–2nd	
Midland:		6–4	6–1		
Redlands Bulldogs (Southern California Conference) (1926)
1926	Redlands	0–9	0–7	8th	
Redlands:		0–9	0–7		
Total:		6–13			
