= Wilbur Eaton =

American football player and basketball coach (1903–1993)

Biographical details
- Born: February 2, 1903; Omaha, Nebraska, U.S.
- Died: August 10, 1993 (aged 90); Colfax, Iowa, U.S.

Playing career

Football
- 1923–1924: Notre Dame
- Position: End

Coaching career (HC unless noted)

Football
- 1925: Notre Dame (freshmen)
- 1926–1930: Mount St. Charles
- 1931: Howard (AL) (backfield)
- 1933: St. Thomas (MN)

Basketball
- 1931–1932: Howard (AL)

Head coaching record
- Overall: 6–20 (basketball)

Wilbur Smyth Eaton (February 2, 1903 – August 10, 1993) was an American college football player and coach of college football and college basketball. He played college football for the Notre Dame Fighting Irish from 1923 to 1924 alongside the famed Four Horsemen.

Eaton served as the head football coach at Mount St. Charles College—now known as Carroll College—in Helena, Montana from 1926 to 1930 and at the University of St. Thomas in St Paul, Minnesota in 1933. He was also the head basketball coach at Howard College—now known as Samford University—in Homewood, Alabama during the 1931–32 season.
