= Paul McNulty (American football) =

American football player (1902–1985)

Profile
- Position: End

Personal information
- Born: August 9, 1902; Chicago, Illinois, U.S.
- Died: September 27, 1985 (aged 83); Chicago, Illinois, U.S.

Career information
- College: University of Michigan; University of Notre Dame

Career history
- 1924–1925: Chicago Cardinals

Paul Davis McNulty (August 9, 1902 – September 27, 1985) was an American professional football player who was a wide receiver for two seasons for the Chicago Cardinals.
