= Ed Hunsinger =

American football player and coach (1901–1960)

Biographical details
- Born: June 28, 1901; Chillicothe, Ohio, U.S.
- Died: August 23, 1960 (aged 59); Philadelphia, Pennsylvania, U.S.

Playing career
- 1922–1924: Notre Dame
- 1925: Waterbury Blues
- 1925: Hartford Blues
- 1926: Brooklyn Horsemen
- Position: End

Coaching career (HC unless noted)
- 1926–1932: Villanova (assistant)
- 1933–1934: Fordham (assistant)
- 1935–1936: Niagara

Accomplishments and honors

Championships
- National (1924)

Edward Hunsinger (June 8, 1901 – August 23, 1960) was an American football player and coach. He played college football as an end at the University of Notre Dame. He played for the Fighting Irish from 1922 until 1924 and was a member of the "Seven Mules" line that blocked for the famed Four Horsemen. Hunsinger had not played football prior to his time with the Irish.

Hunsinger was involved with the Irish All-Stars 1925 exhibition game against the Pottsville Maroons, which led to the Maroons being stripped of the 1925 NFL Championship. Also in 1925, Hunsinger was signed on to play professional football for the Waterbury/Hartford Blues, which were later members of the National Football League (NFL) in 1926. By 1926, he was playing for the Brooklyn Horsemen of the first American Football League.

During the mid-1930s Hunsinger was an ends coach at Fordham University, where he moved Vince Lombardi from end to guard. He served as the head football coach at Niagara University from 1935 to 1936.

Hunsinger died on August 23, 1960, at Philadelphia General Hospital in Philadelphia, Pennsylvania.
