= 1922 All-Western college football team =

American all-star college football team

The 1922 All-Western college football team consists of American football players selected to the All-Western teams chosen by various selectors for the 1922 college football season.

== All-Western selections ==
=== Ends ===
- Bernard Kirk, Michigan (WE-1)
- Gus Tebell, Wisconsin (WE-1)
- Max Kadesky, Iowa (WE-2)
- Paul G. Goebel, Michigan (WE-2)

=== Tackles ===
- Bub Weller, Nebraska (WE-1)
- Marty Below, Wisconsin (WE-1) (CFHOF)
- George Thompson, Iowa (WE-2)
- Stanley Muirhead, Michigan (WE-2)

=== Guards ===
- Jim McMillen, Illinois (WE-1)
- Ed Degree, Notre Dame (WE-1)
- Ray Hahn, Kansas State (WE-2)
- Paul Minick, Iowa (WE-2)

=== Centers ===
- Ralph King, Chicago (WE-1)
- John C. Heldt, Iowa (WE-2)

=== Quarterbacks ===
- Rollie Williams, Wisconsin (WE-1)
- Irwin Uteritz, Michigan (WE-2)

=== Halfbacks ===
- Earl Martineau, Minnesota (WE-1)
- Harry Kipke, Michigan (WE-1) (CFHOF)
- Bill Boelter, Drake (WE-2)
- Jimmy Pyott, Chicago (WE-2)

=== Fullbacks ===
- Gordon Locke, Iowa (WE-1) (CFHOF)
- Franklin Cappon, Michigan (WE-2)

== Key ==
WE = Walter Eckersall in the Chicago Tribune

CFHOF = College Football Hall of Fame

== See also ==
- 1922 College Football All-America Team
