= 1922 All-Eastern football team =

American all-star college football team

The 1922 All-Eastern football team consists of American football players chosen by various selectors as the best players at each position among the Eastern colleges and universities during the 1922 college football season.

== All-Eastern selections ==
=== Quarterbacks ===
- George Smythe, Army (BE-1; INS-1)
- Charles Buell, Harvard (INS-2; ETP-2)
- George Pfann, Cornell (ETP-1)

=== Halfbacks ===
- Eddie Kaw, Cornell (BE-1; INS-1; ETP-1)
- Hal Erickson, Washington & Jefferson (INS-2; ETP-1)
- Leonard Brunner, Lafayette (BE-1)
- Ralph Jordan, Yale (INS-2; ETP-2)
- Floyd Ramsey, Cornell (ETP-2)

=== Fullbacks ===
- George Owen, Harvard (BE-1; INS-1; ETP-1)
- Orville Hewitt, Pittsburgh (INS-1)
- William H. Wood, Army (INS-2; ETP-2)

=== Ends ===
- Howdy Gray, Princeton (BE-1; INS-1, ETP-1)
- Herb Kopf, Washington & Jefferson (BE-1; INS-2)
- Edward Gouinlock, Cornell (INS-1)
- Warren Parr, Navy (ETP-1)
- Stout, Princeton (INS-2)
- Wendell Taylor, Navy (ETP-2)

=== Tackles ===
- Mike Gulian, Brown (BE-1; INS-1; ETP-1)
- Herb Treat, Princeton (BE-1; INS-1; ETP-1)
- Denis J. Mulligan, Army (INS-2)
- Harland Baker, Princeton (INS-2)
- Leonard C. Hanson, Cornell (ETP-2)
- John Thurman, Penn (ETP-2)

=== Guards ===
- Frank Schwab, Lafayette (BE-1; INS-2; ETP-1)
- Cross, Yale (INS-1; ETP-1)
- Jack Sack, Pittsburgh (BE-1)
- Fritz Breidster, Army (INS-1)
- Charles Hubbard, Harvard (INS-2; ETP-2)
- Jim Welsh, Colgate (ETP-2)

=== Centers ===
- Charley Bowser, Pittsburgh (BE-1; ETP-1)
- Edgar Garbisch, Army (INS-1; ETP-2)
- Alford, Princeton (INS-2)

== Key ==
- BE = "Billy Evans Eastern Honor Roll", selected by 40 of the leading football critics of that section
- INS = International News Service
- ETP = Evening Tribune, Providence, selected as the opinion of 15 writers

== See also ==
- 1922 College Football All-America Team
