= 1922 All-America college football team =

Official list of the best college football players of 1922

The 1922 All-America college football team is composed of college football players who were selected as All-Americans by various organizations and writers that chose All-America college football teams in 1922. The only selector recognized by the NCAA as "official" for the 1922 season is Walter Camp, whose selections were published in Collier's Weekly. Additional selectors who chose All-American teams in 1922 included: Athletic World magazine, selected by 214 coaches; Norman E. Brown, sports editor of the Central Press Association; the New York Tribune, selected by Ray McCarthy with advice from Grantland Rice and William B. Hanna; Walter Eckersall, of the Chicago Tribune; Frank G. Menke; and Billy Evans, who polled 200 sports editors.

Iowa quarterback Gordon Locke was the only player chosen as a first-team All-American by all 10 selectors referenced herein. Locke led the undefeated 1922 Iowa Hawkeyes to a 6–0 win over Yale, which had never before lost to a team from the "West". After returning by train from Yale, Locke scored Iowa's only touchdown in an 8–7 win over Illinois.

Cornell back Eddie Kaw was chosen as a first-team All-American by 9 of the 10 selectors, and he also had more votes (122) than any other player in the All-America survey conducted by the Romelke Press Clipping Bureau, based on votes of "nearly every important pressman who has picked an All-American team."

== Consensus All-Americans ==
For the year 1922, the NCAA recognizes only Walter Camp's selections as "official" for purposes of its consensus determinations. Accordingly, the NCAA's consensus All-America team mirrors Camp's selections. The following chart identifies the NCAA-recognized consensus All-Americans and displays which first-team designations they received.

Name	Position	School	Official	Other	Number - total	Romelke points
Gordon Locke	Quarterback	Iowa	WC	AW, BE, FH, FM, LP, NB, NYT, RO, WE	10/10	111
Eddie Kaw	Halfback	Cornell	WC	AW, BE, FH, FM, LP, NB, RO, WE	9/10	122
Herb Treat	Tackle	Princeton	WC	BE, FM, LP, NB, RO, WE	7/10	96
Harry Kipke	Halfback	Michigan	WC	AW, BE, LP, NB, WE	6/10	99
Paul G. Goebel	End	Michigan	--	AW, BE, LP, NB, NYT, RO	6/10	67
Harold Muller	End	California	WC	AW, BE, FM, NB, WE	6/10	RO-3
Frank Schwab	Guard	Lafayette	WC	AW, BE, RO, WE	5/10	94
George Owen	Halfback	Harvard	--	BE, FH, RO WE	4/10	113
Mike Gulian	Tackle	Brown	--	AW, BE, LP, RO	4/10	97
Howdy Gray	End	Princeton	--	BE, FH, LP, RO	4/10	93
Edgar Garbisch	Center	Army	WC	BE, NB, NYT, RO	4/10	78
Fritz Breidster	Guard	Army	--	AW, BE, FM, WE	4/10	76
Charles Buell	Quarterback	Harvard	--	AW, BE, NB, RO	4/10	58
John Webster Thomas	Fullback	Chicago	WC	BE, NYT	3/10	65
Paul Minick	Guard	Iowa	--	NB, RO	2/10	93
Charles Hubbard	Guard	Harvard	WC	--	1/10	54
Wendell Taylor	End	Navy	WC	--	1/10	RO-4
John Thurman	Tackle	Penn	WC	--	1/10	NR

== Dissatisfaction with Camp's selections ==
By 1922, there was growing dissatisfaction with relying on the selections of the aged Walter Camp, who was perceived as being biased to Eastern players and who saw only a small number of games each year. Among the major selectors in 1922, Camp was alone in naming several Eastern players as first-team All-Americans, including Harvard guard Charles Hubbard, Navy end Wendell Taylor, and Penn tackle John Thurman. A syndicated columnist from Ohio accused Camp of favoritism:

"We print with apologies the All-American football teams selected by Walter Camp. We print them because Walter picks them and for years [we] have been accustomed to regard Camp's choices as official. But in our opinion Camp's teams this year are positively the poorest that the dean of football critics has ever foisted upon the public. For we find Camp drifting unquestionably back into the old rut of letting his eastern feelings dominate his selections. It is a positive travesty upon All-American selections to have six members of the first team honor teams chosen from the eastern Big Three—Harvard, Yale and Princeton . . . Camp should begin once more to see the light or the first thing he knows folks will forget the halo with which he has been for years blessed in the opinion of football followers."

Notable omissions from Camp's 1922 squad included halfback George Owen who received the second most All-America points out of all players at all positions in the Romelke survey discussed below. Likewise, ends Paul G. Goebel and Howdy Gray received the most votes at their position in the Romelke survey, but were not selected by Camp.

== Romelke approach ==
An alternate attempt at developing a consensus All-America team was developed in 1922 by the Romelke Press Clipping Bureau. Romelke assembled a consensus All-American team based on its compilation of the votes of "nearly every important pressman who has picked an All-American team." In addition to naming players to five All-American teams based on the consensus voting, Romelke also compiled the total number of votes compiled by each school and ranked how the schools ranked in the voting. The team statistics compiled by Romelke showed the following schools receiving the highest vote count.

School	Votes	Names of members
Michigan	385	Harry Kipke (99), Paul Goebel (67), Bernard Kirk (66), Stanley Muirhead (51), Irwin Uteritz (30), Oliver Aas (29), Franklin Cappon (23)
Iowa	345	Gordon Locke (111), Paul Minnick (93), John C. Heldt (69), George Thompson (39), Max Kadesky (33)
Chicago	268	McMillen (83), Ralph King (66), John Webster Thomas (65), Harold Fletcher (64)
Princeton	259	Herb Treat (96), Howdy Gray (93), Pink Baker (38), Mel Dickinson (25)
Army	254	Edgar Garbisch (78), Fritz Breidster (76), George Smythe (48), Denis J. Mulligan (31), William H. Wood (23)
Cornell	239	Eddie Kaw (122), Leonard C. Hanson (64), George Pfann (33)
Harvard	227	George Owen (113), Charles Buell (58), Charles Hubbard (54)
Wisconsin	211	Marty Below (57), Shorty Barr (55), Gus Tebell (51), Rollie Williams (47)
Lafayette	133	Frank Schwab (94), Bots Brunner (30)
Brown	97	Mike Gulian (97)

== All-Americans of 1922 ==
=== Ends ===
- **Harold Muller**, California (College Football Hall of Fame) (WC-1; AW-1; WE-1; NB-1; LP-2; BE; FM-1; RO-3)
- **Wendell Taylor**, Navy (WC-1; RO-4)
- Bernard Kirk, Michigan (WC-2; NYT-1; WE-1; NB-2; LP-2; BE; FH-1; RO-2)
- Paul G. Goebel, Michigan (NYT-1; NB-1; AW-1; LP-1; BE; RO-1)
- Howdy Gray, Princeton (WE-2; LP-1; BE; FH-1; RO-1)
- Lynn Bomar, Vanderbilt (College Football Hall of Fame) (WC-2; WE-3 [tackle]; BE; FM-1)
- Red Roberts, Centre (AW-1 [tackle]; WE-2; FM-2; BE; RO-5)
- Gus Tebell, Wisconsin (NYT-2; WE-3; BE; RO-3)
- Herb Kopf, Washington & Jefferson (WC-3; RO-5)
- Max Kadesky, Iowa (WC-3; NB-2; FH-2; RO-4)
- Lee Spillers, Washington & Jefferson (WE-3)
- Ray Eklund, Minnesota (FM-2)
- Steve Pulaski, Wisconsin (NYT-2)
- Warren S. Parr, Navy (FH-2; RO-2)
- Charlie Berry, Lafayette (BE)

=== Tackles ===
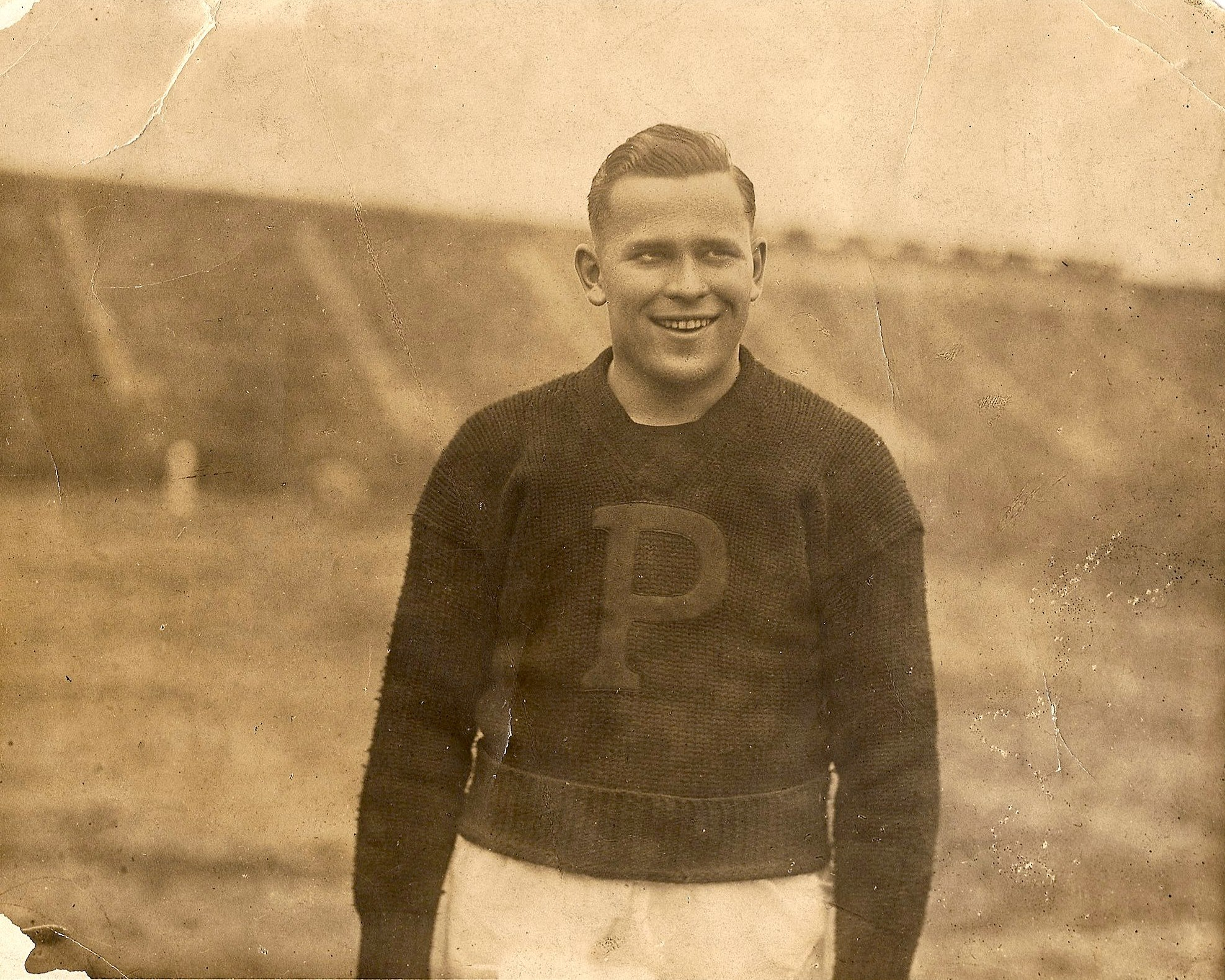
John Thurman of Penn.

- **John Thurman**, Penn (WC-1; WE-3)
- **Herb Treat**, Princeton (WC-1; WE-1; NB-1; LP-1; BE; FM-1; RO-1)
- Mike Gulian, Brown (WC-3; AW-1; WE-2; NB-2; LP-1; BE; RO-1)
- Bub Weller, Nebraska (WE-1; BE; FM-2; FH-1)
- Marty Below, Wisconsin (College Football Hall of Fame) (WC-3; NYT-1; WE-2; NB-1; RO-2)
- Leonard C. Hanson, Cornell (NB-2; BE; FH-1; RO-2)
- Leonard Smith, Wisconsin (NYT-1)
- Gus Sonnenberg, Detroit (FM-1)
- Pappy Waldorf, Syracuse (College Football Hall of Fame) (WC-2)
- Lloyd "Pudge" Neidlinger, Dartmouth (WC-2)
- Leo Kriz, Iowa (NYT-2)
- George Thompson, Iowa (NYT-2; RO-4)
- Graham Penfield, Northwestern (LP-2; BE; RO-3)
- Stanley Muirhead, Michigan (LP-2; RO-4)
- Russ Meredith, West Virginia (BE; FM-2)
- John Spellman, Brown (FH-2)
- Denis J. Mulligan, Army (FH-2; RO-5)
- Tiny McMahon, Penn State (BE)
- Joe Bennett, Georgia (BE)
- Harold Fletcher, Chicago (RO-3)
- Harland "Pink" Baker, Princeton (RO-5)

=== Guards ===
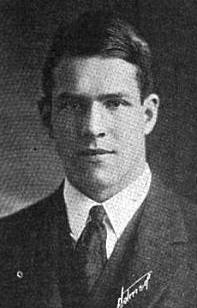
Charles Hubbard of Harvard.

- **Charles Hubbard**, Harvard (WC-1; WE-2; LP-2; RO-3)
- **Frank Schwab**, Lafayette (College Football Hall of Fame) (WC-1; AW-1; WE-1; BE; RO-1)
- Fritz Breidster, Army (AW-1; WE-1; BE; FM-1; RO-2)
- Paul Minick, Iowa (WC-2; NB-1; LP-2; FH-2; RO-1)
- Jim McMillen, Illinois (WC-3; NYT-2; WE-2; NB-2; BE; FH-1; RO-2)
- Harry Cross, Yale (WC-2; NB-1; FM-2; RO-5)
- Lloyd Pixley, Ohio State (NYT-1; FM-2; RO-3)
- Oscar Davis, Georgia Tech (LP-1; BE)
- Ed Degree, Notre Dame (FM-1)
- Joe Pondelik, Chicago (LP-1)
- Thomas Long, Ohio State (NYT-1)
- Leo Calland, USC (WE-3)
- Joe Bedenk, Penn State (WE-3)
- Joe Setron, West Virginia (WC-2; BE)
- Mel Dickinson, Princeton (WC-3; NB-2)
- Jack Sack (born Jacob Bernard Sacklowsky), Pittsburgh (BE; RO-4)
- Webster Clarke, California (BE)
- Roy Miller, Illinois (NYT-2)
- Phillip Cruikshank, Yale (FH-1)
- Jim Welsh, Colgate (FH-2; RO-4)

=== Centers ===
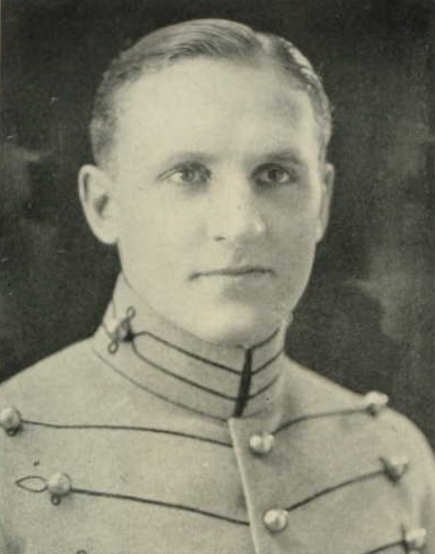
Ed Garbisch of Army.

- **Edgar Garbisch**, Army (College Football Hall of Fame) (WC-1; NYT-1; NB-1; BE; RO-1)
- Charley Bowser, Pittsburgh (WE-1; BE; FM-1; RO-2)
- John C. Heldt, Iowa (WE-3; LP-2; BE; FH-1; RO-3)
- Dudley DeGroot, Stanford (AW-1)
- Frank Culver, Syracuse (LP-1)
- Ralph King, Chicago (WE-2; FM-2; RO-4)
- Carl Peterson, Nebraska (WC-3)
- Winslow Lovejoy, Yale (NB-2; BE)
- John Heaphy, Boston College (BE)
- Newsh Bentz, Penn State (BE)
- Oliver Aas, Minnesota (BE; RO-5)
- Ed Kubale, Centre (BE)
- Al Crook, Washington & Jefferson (FH-2)

=== Quarterbacks ===
- **Gordon Locke**, Iowa (College Football Hall of Fame) (WC-1; NYT-1; AW-1 [fb]; WE-1; NB-1 [hb]; LP-1 [fb]; BE [fb]; FM-1 [hb]; FH-1; RO-1 [fb])
- Charles Buell, Harvard (AW-1; WE-2; NB-1; BE; FH-2; RO-1)
- Irwin Uteritz, Michigan (WC-3; WE-3; FM-1; RO-5)
- George Smythe, Army (WC-2; BE; RO-4)
- George Pfann, Cornell (College Football Hall of Fame) (BE; FM-2; RO-3)
- Herb Covington, Centre (NB-2; BE)
- Hoge Workman, Ohio State (NYT-2)
- Shorty Barr, Wisconsin (RO-2)
- Charles Darling, Boston College (BE)
- Jimmy Robertson, Carnegie Tech (BE)
- Oliver Kuhn, Vanderbilt (BE)
- Matt "Matty" Brennan, Lafayette (BE)

=== Halfbacks ===
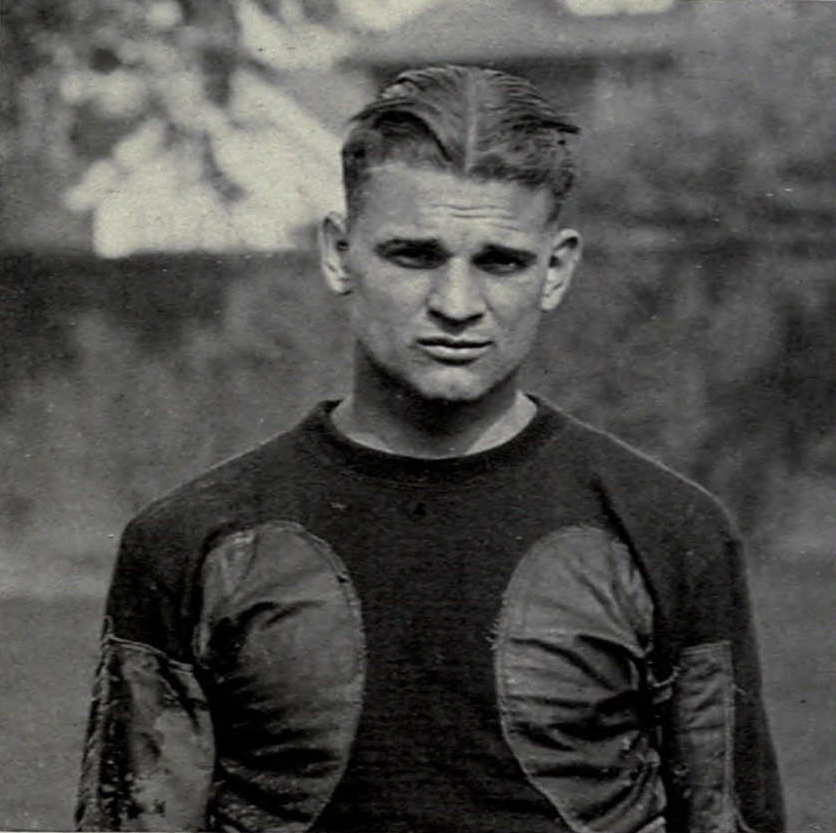
Harry Kipke of Michigan.

- **Harry Kipke**, Michigan (College Football Hall of Fame) (WC-1; NYT-2; AW-1; WE-1; NB-1; LP-1 [qb]; BE; RO-2)
- **Eddie Kaw**, Cornell (College Football Hall of Fame) (WC-1; AW-1; WE-1; NB-1 [fb]; LP-1; BE; FM-1; FH-1 [fb]; RO-1)
- George Owen, Harvard (College Football Hall of Fame) (WC-2; WE-1 [fb]; NB-2; LP-2 [fb]; BE [FB]; FH-1; RO-1)
- Earl Martineau, Minnesota (NYT-1; WE-2; LP-2 [qb]; BE; FM-2; RO-3 [fb])
- Otis C. McCreery, Minnesota (NYT-1)
- Jack Cleaves, Princeton (FH-1)
- Nick Nardacci, West Virginia (WE-2; BE)
- Leonard "Bots" Brunner, Lafayette (BE; FM-1; RO-3)
- Ralph Edward Jordan, Yale (WC-3; WE-3; NB-2; RO-3)
- Stephen Barchet, Navy (WC-3)
- Donald Nichols, California (BE)
- Rollie Williams, Wisconsin (BE; RO-2; WE-3)
- Arch Nesbit, California (FH-2)
- Jonathan Miller, Penn (FH-2)
- Harry Wilson, Penn State (RO-4)

=== Fullbacks ===
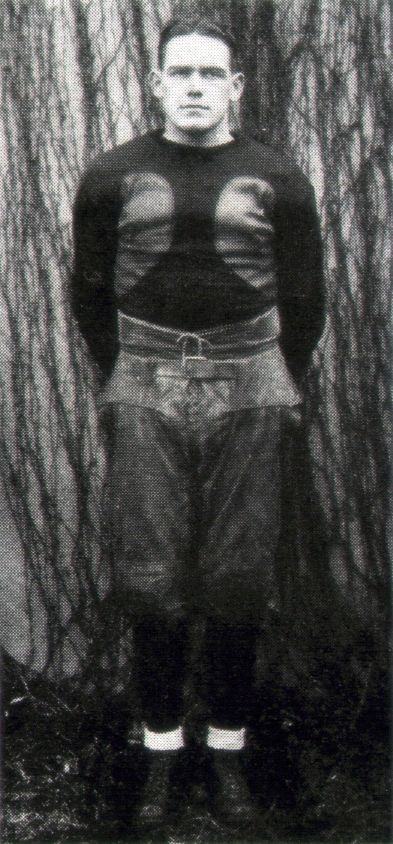
John Thomas of Chicago.

- **John Webster Thomas**, Chicago (WC-1; NYT-1; NB-2; LP-2; BE; RO-2)
- Paul Castner, Notre Dame (WC-3; LP-1; BE; RO-5)
- Duke Morrison, California (WC-2 [hb]; WE-2; LP-2 [hb]; BE; FM-2; RO-4 [hb])
- Franklin Cappon, Michigan (WE-3; NYT-2 [hb]; FH-2; RO-5 [hb])
- Red Barron, Georgia Tech (WC-2; BE [hb]; FM-2 [hb])
- William H. Wood, Army (BE; RO-5 [hb])
- Chick Hartley, Nebraska (BE)
- John H. Fletcher, Georgia (BE)
- Merrill Taft, Wisconsin (NYT-2)
- Orville Hewitt, Pittsburgh (RO-4)

=== Key ===
NCAA recognized selector for 1922

- WC = Collier's Weekly as selected by Walter Camp

Other selectors

- AW = Athletic World magazine, selected by 214 coaches
- NYT = New York Tribune, selected by Ray McCarthy of the New York Tribune with advice from Grantland Rice and William B. Hanna. McCarthy selected his ends, guards, tackles and halfbacks in pairs from a single team.
- WE = Walter Eckersall, of the Chicago Tribune
- NB = Norman E. Brown, sports editor of the Central Press Association
- LP = Lawrence Perry
- BE = Billy Evans National Honor Roll, as culled from the selections of 200 sports editors, include eight players at each position.
- FM = Frank G. Menke
- FH = Fred A. Hayner, sports writer of the Chicago Daily News
- RO = Romelke Press Clipping Bureau, based on votes of "nearly every important pressman who has picked an All-American team."

Bold = Consensus All-American

- 1 – First-team selection
- 2 – Second-team selection
- 3 – Third-team selection

== See also ==
- 1922 All-Big Ten Conference football team
- 1922 All-Eastern football team
- 1922 All-Pacific Coast football team
- 1922 All-Southern college football team
- 1922 All-Western college football team
