= 1921 All-Eastern football team =

American football team chosen from Eastern colleges and universities

The 1921 All-Eastern football team consists of American football players chosen by various selectors as the best players at each position among the Eastern colleges and universities during the 1921 college football season.

== All-Eastern selections ==
=== Quarterbacks ===
- Glenn Killinger, Penn State (UP-1, CR-1, BR-1, BE-1, BH-1)
- Charles Buell, Harvard (UP-2, CR-2)
- Donold Lourie, Princeton (CR-3)

=== Halfbacks ===
- Mac Aldrich, Yale (UP-1, CR-1, BR-1, BE-1, BH-1)
- Eddie Kaw, Cornell (UP-1, CR-1, BH-1)
- Tom Davies, Pittsburgh (CR-2, BE-1)
- Stephen Barchet, Navy (UP-2, BR-1)
- Joseph Lightner, Penn State (UP-2)
- Hal Erickson, Washington & Jefferson (CR-2)
- Walter French, Army (CR-3)
- James Robertson, Dartmouth (UP-3, CR-3)
- Harry Wilson, Penn State (UP-3)
- Ralph Jordan, Yale (UP-3)

=== Fullbacks ===
- George Owen, Harvard (UP-1, CR-2, BR-1, BE-1, BH-1)
- Doc Elliott, Lafayette (CR-1)
- Hank Garrity, Princeton (UP-2)
- Dutch Connor, New Hampshire State (CR-3)

=== Ends ===
- Justin Sturm, Yale (UP-2, CR-1, BR-1, BH-1)
- Russ Stein, Washington & Jefferson (CR-2, BR-1)
- A. Barr Snively, Princeton (UP-1, CR-2, BE-1)
- Stanley McCollum, Penn State (UP-1, CR-3, BR-1)
- Charles Macomber, Harvard (UP-2, CR-3, BE-1)
- Jimmie Munns, Cornell (CR-1)
- Roberts, Centre (BH-1)
- Wendell Taylor, Navy (UP-3)

=== Tackles ===
- Stan Keck, Princeton (UP-1, CR-1, BR-1, BE-1, BH-1)
- Into, Yale (UP-2, CR-2, BE-1, BH-1)
- King, Navy (UP-1, CR-1)
- Bertrand Gulick, Syracuse (CR-2)
- Howard Raub, Rutgers (UP-2)
- Art Deibel, Lafayette (UP-3)
- Donold Lourie, Princeton (UP-3)
- Wilson Dodge, Cornell (CR-3)
- Williams, Lafayette (CR-3)

=== Guards ===
- Fiske Brown, Harvard (UP-1, CR-2, BR-1, BE-1, BH-1)
- Frank Schwab, Lafayette (UP-2, CR-1, BR-1, BH-1)
- Art Carney, Navy (CR-2, BE-1)
- Fritz Breidster, Army (UP-1)
- Ray Baer, Penn State (CR-1)
- Joe Bedenk, Penn State (UP-2)
- Harland Baker, Princeton (UP-3)
- Warren Parr, Navy (UP-3)
- Guernsey, Yale (CR-3)
- Johnny Budd, Lafayette (CR-3)

=== Centers ===
- Herb Stein, Pittsburgh (UP-1, CR-1, BE-1)
- Albert Wittmer, Princeton (UP-2, CR-2, BR-1)
- Bert Shurtleff, Brown (BH-1)
- R. Keith Kane, Harvard (UP-3)
- Swede Larson, Navy (CR-3)

== Key ==
- UP = United Press
- CR = Carl Reed, "the well-known football official"
- BR = Bill Roper, head coach of Princeton
- BE = Billy Evans
- BH = Boston Herald

== See also ==
- 1921 College Football All-America Team
