= 1921 All-Western college football team =

American all-star team

The 1921 All-Western college football team consists of American football players selected to the All-Western teams chosen by various selectors for the 1921 college football season.

== All-Western selections ==
=== Ends ===
- Fritz Crisler, Chicago (COL-1, WE-1) (CFHOF)
- Lester Belding, Iowa (COL-1, WE-2)
- Truck Myers, Ohio State (WE-1)
- Paul G. Goebel, Michigan (COL-2, WE-3)
- Gus Tebell, Wisconsin (COL-2, WE-3)
- Stevens Gould, Wisconsin (WE-2)

=== Tackles ===
- Duke Slater, Iowa (COL-1, WE-1) (CFHOF)
- Charles McGuire, Chicago (COL-1, WE-1)
- Iolas Huffman, Ohio State (COL-2, WE-2)
- James Brader, Wisconsin (COL-2, WE-2)
- Robert H. Spiers, Ohio State (WE-3)
- Ed Carman, Purdue (WE-3)

=== Guards ===
- Dean W. Trott, Ohio State (COL-1, WE-1)
- Lloyd Pixley, Ohio State (COL-1)
- Robert J. Dunne, Michigan (WE-1)
- Charles Redmon, Chicago (COL-2, WE-2)
- Ferdinand Birk, Purdue (COL-2)
- Albert W. T. Mohr, Jr., Illinois (WE-2)
- Paul Minick, Iowa (WE-3)
- William G. McCaw, Indiana (WE-3)

=== Centers ===
- George C. Bunge, Wisconsin (COL-1, WE-2)
- Ernie Vick, Michigan (COL-2, WE-1) (CFHOF)
- John C. Heldt, Iowa (WE-3)

=== Quarterbacks ===
- Aubrey Devine, Iowa (COL-1, WE-1) (CFHOF)
- Hoge Workman, Ohio State (COL-2)
- Milton Romney, Chicago (WE-2)
- Irwin Uteritz, Michigan (WE-3)

=== Halfbacks ===
- Alvah Elliott, Wisconsin (COL-1, WE-1)
- Roland Williams, Wisconsin (COL-1)
- Don Peden, Illinois (WE-1)
- John D. Stuart, Ohio State (COL-2, WE-3)
- Stevens Gould, Wisconsin (COL-2)
- Franklin Cappon, Michigan (WE-2)
- Laurie Walquist, Illinois (WE-2)
- Earl Martineau, Minnesota (WE-3)

=== Fullbacks ===
- Gordon Locke, Iowa (COL-1, WE-1) (CFHOF)
- Guy Sundt, Wisconsin (COL-2, WE-3)
- Thomas, Chicago (WE-2)

== Key ==
COL = Collier's Weekly selected by E. C. Patterson and Billy Evans

WE = Walter Eckersall in the Chicago Tribune (all-conference)

CFHOF = College Football Hall of Fame

== See also ==
- 1921 College Football All-America Team
- 1921 All-Big Ten Conference football team
