= 1922 All-Big Ten Conference football team =

American college football all-star team

The 1922 All-Big Ten Conference football team consists of American football players selected to the All-Big Ten Conference teams chosen by various selectors for the 1922 Big Ten Conference football season.

== Ends ==
- Bernard Kirk, Michigan (CON [29/50]; CA; CJ-1; CP; CT-1; PA-1; WE-1)
- Gus Tebell, Wisconsin (CJ-1; CP; CT-1; PA-1; WE-1)
- Paul G. Goebel, Michigan (CON; CJ-2; CT-2; PA-2; WE-2)
- Max Kadesky, Iowa (CA; CJ-2; CT-3; PA-2; WE-2)
- Frank Hanny, Indiana (CT-2)
- Otto Strohmeier, Chicago (CJ-3)
- Ray Eklund, Minnesota (CJ-3; WE-3)
- Leo V. Scherer, Nebraska (WE-3)
- David D. Wilson, Illinois (CT-3)

== Tackles ==
- Marty Below, Wisconsin (CON; CA; CJ-2; CP; CT-1; PA-1; WE-1)
- Harold Fletcher, Chicago (CJ-1; CT-1; WE-3)
- Henry Day Penfield, Northwestern (CON [31/50]; CA; CJ-2; PA-1; WE-3)
- Stanley Muirhead, Michigan (CJ-1; CT-2; WE-2)
- Bub Weller, Nebraska (WE-1)
- George Thompson, Iowa (WE-2; CJ-3; CP)
- Louis Gross, Minnesota (CT-2)
- Frank Gowdy, Chicago (CJ-3)
- George Abramson, Minnesota (CT-3)
- Ed Vandervoort, Michigan (CT-3)

== Guards ==
- Jim McMillen, Illinois (CON [42/50]; CA; CJ-2; CP; CT-1; PA-1; WE-1)
- Paul Minick, Iowa (CON; CA; CJ-1; CP; PA-1; WE-2)
- Lloyd Pixley, Ohio State (CJ-1; CT-1; PA-2; WE-3)
- Ed Degree, Notre Dame (WE-1)
- Rudolph Hohfield, Wisconsin (CJ-2; CT-2)
- Ray D. Hahn, Kansas State (WE-2)
- Chester Mead, Iowa (CT-2)
- Harold Lewis, Chicago (PA-2)
- Joe Pondelik, Chicago (CJ-3; WE-3)
- Leo Kriz, Iowa (CJ-3)
- Edward Slaughter, Michigan (CT-3)
- Harold Steele, Michigan (CT-3)

== Centers ==
- Ralph King, Chicago (CJ-3; CP; CT-2; PA-1; WE-1)
- John C. Heldt, Iowa (CJ-1; CT-1; WE-2)
- Oliver S. Aas, Minnesota (CON [19/50]; CA; CJ-2; CT-3; PA-2; WE-3)

== Quarterbacks ==
- Rollie Williams, Wisconsin (CON [hb]; CJ-1 [hb]; CT-1 [hb]; PA-1; WE-1)
- Irwin Uteritz, Michigan (CJ-2; CP; CT-1; PA-2; WE-2)
- Shorty Barr, Wisconsin (CT-2)
- Leland Parkin, Iowa (CJ-3; CT-3)
- Dunn, Marquette (WE-3)

== Halfbacks ==
- Harry Kipke, Michigan (CON; CA; CJ-1; CP; CT-1; PA-1; WE-1)
- Earl Martineau, Minnesota (CA; CJ-2; CP; CT-2; PA-1; WE-1)
- Hoge Workman, Ohio State (CJ-2; CT-2)
- Jackson Keefer, Michigan (CT-2)
- Otis C. McCreery, Minnesota (CT-2)
- Bill Boelter, Drake (WE-2)
- Jimmy Pyott, Chicago (CJ-3; PA-2; WE-2)
- Charles W. Palmer, Northwestern (CJ-3; WE-3)
- V. Craven Shuttleworth, Iowa (WE-3)

== Fullbacks ==
- Gordon Locke, Iowa (CON [46/50] [qb]; CA [qb]; CJ-1 [qb]; CP [fullback]; CT-1 [fullback]; PA-1 [fullback]; WE-1 [fullback])
- John Webster Thomas, Chicago (CON; CA; CJ-1; CT-2; PA-2)
- Willis Zorn, Chicago (CJ-2)
- Franklin Cappon, Michigan (CJ-3; CT-3; PA-2 [halfback]; WE-2)
- Harold S. Hartley, Nebraska (WE-3)

== See also ==
- 1922 College Football All-America Team

== Key ==
CON = Consensus based on compiling votes from 50 sports editors who selected teams

CA = Chicago American

CJ = selected by Norman Ross of the Chicago Evening Journal

CP = Chicago Post

CT = Capital Times selected by Bryn Griffiths

PA = The Pantagraph of Bloomington, Illinois

WE = Walter Eckersall in the Chicago Tribune

Bold = Consensus first-team selection of the majority of selectors listed above
