= 1921 All-America college football team =

Official list of the best college football players of 1921

The 1921 All-America college football team is composed of college football players who were selected as All-Americans by various organizations and writers that chose All-America college football teams in 1921. The only selector recognized by the NCAA as "official" for the 1921 season is Walter Camp, whose selections were published in Collier's Weekly. Additional selectors who chose All-American teams in 1921 included: Football World magazine, based on collected opinions of 267 coaches; Walter Eckersall of the Chicago Tribune; Jack Veiock, sports editor of the International News Service; and Norman E. Brown of the Central Press Association.

== Consensus All-Americans ==
For the year 1921, the NCAA recognizes only Walter Camp's selections as "official" for purposes of its consensus determinations. Nevertheless, the NCAA's consensus All-America team does not mirror Camp's selections. The following chart identifies the NCAA-recognized consensus All-Americans and displays which first-team designations they received.

| Name | Position | School | Official | Other | Total |
|---|---|---|---|---|---|
| Aubrey Devine | Quarterback | Iowa | WC | BE, FW, JV, LP, MM, WE | 7/8 |
| Mac Aldrich | Halfback | Yale | WC | BE, JV, MM, NB, WE | 6/8 |
| Herb Stein | Center | Pittsburgh | -- | BE, FW, JV, MM, WE | 5/8 |
| Glenn Killinger | Halfback | Penn State | WC | BE, FW, JV, LP | 5/8 |
| Harold Muller | End | California | WC | FW, MM-1, NB | 4/8 |
| Bo McMillin | Quarterback | Centre | -- | FW, LP, MM, NB | 4/8 |
| Dan McMillan | Tackle | California | -- | FW, JV, WE | 3/8 |
| Fiske Brown | Guard | Harvard | WC | BE, LP | 3/8 |
| Stan Keck | Guard | Princeton | -- | BE, FW, MM | 3/8 |
| Duke Slater | Tackle | Iowa | -- | BE, WE, JV | 3/8 |
| Iolas Huffman | Tackle | Ohio State | -- | FW, LP | 2/8 |
| Eddie Anderson | End | Notre Dame | -- | FW, WE | 2/8 |
| Frank Schwab | Tackle | Lafayette | WC | FW | 2/8 |
| Eddie Kaw | Fullback | Cornell | WC | WE | 2/8 |

== All-Americans of 1921 ==
=== Ends ===
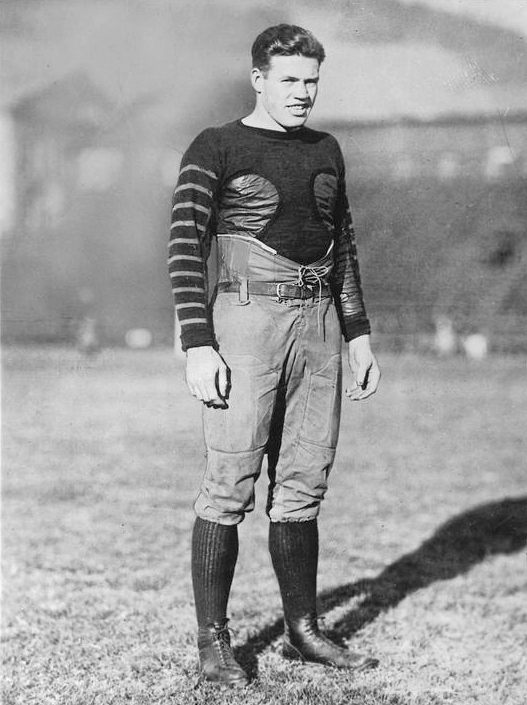
Brick Muller of Cal.

- **Harold Muller**, California (College Football Hall of Fame) (FW-1; WC-1; JV-3; MM-1; NB-1)
- **Eddie Anderson**, Notre Dame (College Football Hall of Fame) (FW-1; BE-2; WE-1; JV-2)
- Fritz Crisler, Chicago (College Football Hall of Fame) (FW-2; WC-3; LP-2; WE-1; MM-2)
- Red Roberts, Centre (WC-1; FW-2 [g]; JV-3; MM-2)
- Warren S. Parr, Navy (LP-1)
- Paul G. Goebel, Michigan (LP-1)
- Roger Kiley, Notre Dame (FW-2; WC-2; BE-1; JV-1; MM-1)
- Charles Clark Macomber, Harvard (BE-1)
- A. Barr Snively, Princeton (NB-1)
- Clarence Swanson, Nebraska (College Football Hall of Fame) (WC-2; BE-2)
- Brodie Stephens, California (WC-3; JV-1)
- Cyril Myers, Ohio State (NB-2)
- David Munns, Cornell (NB-2)
- Stanley McCollum, Penn State (LP-2)
- Lester Belding, Iowa (FW-3; JV-2)
- Owen Reynolds, Georgia (FW-3)

=== Tackles ===
- **Dan McMillan**, California (College Football Hall of Fame) (FW-1; WC-3; WE-1; JV-1)
- **Iolas Huffman**, Ohio State (FW-1; LP-1; BE-2; JV-2; NB-2)
- Duke Slater, Iowa (College Football Hall of Fame) (FW-2; WC-2; BE-1; WE-1; JV-1; MM-2)
- Charles McGuire, Chicago (FW-2; WC-1; BE-2; JV-3; MM-1)
- Russ Stein, Washington & Jefferson (WC-1)
- Bertrand Gullick, Syracuse (NB-1)
- Buck Shaw, Notre Dame (College Football Hall of Fame) (FW-2 [as g]; LP-1)
- Drumm, Princeton (LP-2)
- Franklin Cappon, Michigan (NB-2)
- Albert N. Into, Yale (WC-3; JV-3)
- James Brader, Wisconsin (FW-3)
- Century Milstead, Wabash (College Football Hall of Fame) (FW-3)
- Clyde W. King, Navy (JV-2)
- Johnny Boyle, USC (MM-2)

=== Guards ===
- **Fiske Brown**, Harvard (WC-1; LP-1; BE-1; JV-2)
- **Frank Schwab**, Lafayette (College Football Hall of Fame) (FW-1; WC-1; LP-2)
- **Stan Keck**, Princeton (College Football Hall of Fame) (FW-1; WC-2; LP-2; BE-1; MM-1 [t])
- Dean Trott, Ohio State (WC-2; LP-1; JV-1)
- Art Carney, Navy (BE-1; MM-2)
- Ray Baer, Penn State (WE-1; MM-1)
- Robert J. Dunne, Michigan (NB-1)
- Joe Bedenk, Penn State (WC-2)
- Charles Marion Redmon, Chicago (LP-2; JV-2)
- John Pucelik, Nebraska (WC-3; WE-1)
- Hugh Whelchel, Georgia (WC-3)
- Phillip Cruikshank, Yale (BE-2)
- Heartley Anderson, Notre Dame (BE-2; JV-1)
- Otto Vogel, Illinois (NB-2)
- Joy Berquist, Nebraska (NB-2)
- Carl Peterson, Nebraska (FW-3)
- Lloyd Pixley, Ohio State (FW-3; NB-1)
- Fritz Breidster, Army (JV-3)
- Pink Baker, Princeton (JV-3)
- Leonard C. Hanson, Cornell (MM-1; NB-1 [t])

=== Centers ===
- **Herb Stein**, Pittsburgh (College Football Hall of Fame) (FW-1; WC-3; LP-2; BE-1; WE-1; JV-1; MM-1)
- Ernie Vick, Michigan (College Football Hall of Fame) (FW-3; WC-1; WE-3; MM-2)
- Al Wittmer, Princeton (LP-1; BE-2; JV-2)
- Polly Wallace, Iowa State (NB-1)
- Larsen, Army (FW-2; WC-2)
- George Bunge, Wisconsin (JV-3; MM-2 [g])
- Emery Larson, Navy (NB-2)

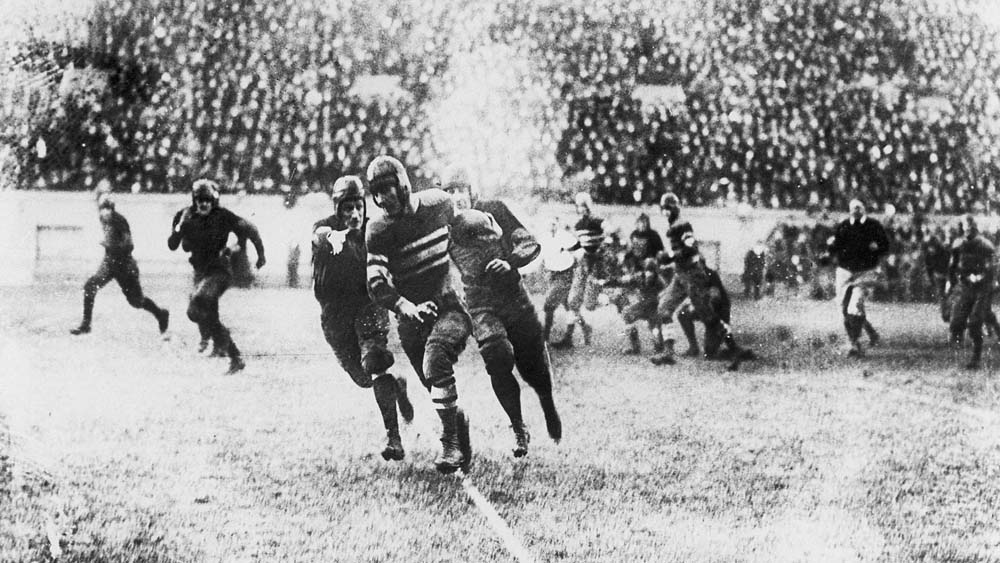
Bo McMillin of Centre scoring on Harvard.

=== Quarterbacks ===
- **Aubrey Devine**, Iowa (College Football Hall of Fame) (FW-1 [hb]; WC-1; LP-1; BE-1; WE-1; JV-1 [hb]; MM-1; NB-2)
- **Bo McMillin**, Centre (College Football Hall of Fame) (FW-1; WC-2; LP-1 [hb]; BE-2; JV-2; MM-1; NB-1)
- Donold Lourie, Princeton (WC-3)
- Milton Romney, Chicago (FW-2; LP-2)
- Charles O'Hearn, Yale (FW-3)
- Hoge Workman, Ohio State (JV-3)

=== Halfbacks ===
Glenn Killinger of Penn State.

- **Glenn Killinger**, Penn State (College Football Hall of Fame) (FW-1; WC-1; LP-1; BE-1; JV-1 [qb])
- **Mac Aldrich**, Yale (FW-2; WC-1; LP-2; BE-1; WE-1; JV-1; MM-1; NB-1)
- George Owen, Harvard (College Football Hall of Fame) (FW-2 [fb]; WC-2; BE-1 [fb]; WE-1 [fb]; JV-1 [fb]; NB-2)
- Tom Davies, Pittsburgh (College Football Hall of Fame) (FW-2; WC-2; BE-2 [fb])
- Walter E. French, Army (WC-3)
- Stephen Barchet, Navy (WC-3)
- Crip Toomey, California (FW-3; BE-2; JV-2)
- Paul Castner, Notre Dame (JV-2)
- Al Elliott, Wisconsin (JV-3; NB-2)
- Red Barron, Georgia Tech (JV-3)
- Gordon Locke, Iowa (MM-1; NB-1 [fb])
- Jim Robertson, Dartmouth (MM-2)
- Roscoe W. Fitts, Harvard (MM-2)
- James Bradshaw, Nevada (MM-2)

=== Fullbacks ===
- **Eddie Kaw**, Cornell (College Football Hall of Fame) (FW-3 [hb]; WC-1; LP-2; BE-2 [hb]; WE-1 [hb]; MM-2)
- Gap Powell, Oregon Aggies (FW-1; MM-1)
- John Mohardt, Notre Dame (WC-2; LP-1 [hb])
- Jack Crangle, Illinois (LP-2)
- Judy Harlan, Georgia Tech (WC-3; FW-3)
- Joe Lightner, Penn State (JV-2; NB-1 [hb])
- Hank Garrity, Princeton (JV-3)
- Orville Hewitt, Pittsburgh (NB-2)

=== Key ===
NCAA recognized selector for 1921

- WC = Walter Camp

Other selectors

- FW = Football World, based on collected opinions of 267 coaches
- LP = Lawrence Perry
- BE = Billy Evans
- WE = Walter Eckersall
- JV = Jack Veiock, International News Service Sports Editor
- MM = Malcolm McLean
- NB = Norman E. Brown of the Central Press

Bold = Consensus All-American

- 1 – First-team selection
- 2 – Second-team selection
- 3 – Third-team selection

== See also ==
- 1921 All-Big Ten Conference football team
- 1921 All-Eastern football team
- 1921 All-Pacific Coast football team
- 1921 All-Southern college football team
- 1921 All-Western college football team
