= Lloyd Neidlinger =

American football and ice hockey player (1901–1978)

Biographical details
- Born: December 23, 1901; Brooklyn, New York, USA
- Died: April 4, 1978 (aged 76); Hyannis, Massachusetts, USA
- Education: Dartmouth College

Playing career

Football
- 1920–1922: Dartmouth

Ice Hockey
- 1920–1921: Dartmouth
- 1922–1923: Dartmouth
- 1925–1927: St. Nicholas Hockey Club
- Positions: Tackle, Goaltender

Coaching career (HC unless noted)
- 1927–1933: Princeton

Head coaching record
- Overall: 71–31–3 (.690)

Lloyd Kellock "Pudge" Neidlinger was an American football player, ice hockey player and head coach and college administrator. He spent most of his professional career as the dean of Dartmouth College but also served as the head coach for the ice hockey team at Princeton.

== Career ==
Neidlinger began attending Dartmouth in the fall of 1919. The following year he joined the varsity ice hockey and football teams. As a senior he was the starting goaltender for the former and an All-American tackle for the latter. During that season, he backstopped the Indians ice hockey team to a fantastic 13–2 record, finishing as the #2 team in the nation. After graduating, he worked for the Peerless Tool Company, eventually becoming an assistant to the president. During this time, he continued his playing career with the St. Nicholas Hockey Club until he was hired as the head coach for the ice hockey team at Princeton. In six season, Neidlinger led the Tigers to a tremendous 71–31–3 record, the best winning percentage of any Princeton hockey coach in history.

In 1933, Neidlinger resigned from both of his positions to become the assistant dean at his alma mater. He was promoted to the main post a year later and remained in that job until 1952. Afterwards, he served as the executive director of council for the International Chamber of Commerce until his retirement in 1965. In the spring of 1978, Neidlinger died after a long illness. He was 76.

== Head coaching record ==
Record table
Season	Team	Overall	Conference	Standing	Postseason
Princeton Tigers Independent (1927–1933)
1927–28	Princeton	5–7–0			
1928–29	Princeton	15–3–1			
1929–30	Princeton	9–8–1			
1930–31	Princeton	14–5–0			
1931–32	Princeton	13–4–1			
1932–33	Princeton	15–4–0			
Princeton:		71–31–3			
Total:		71–31–3			
National champion Postseason invitational champion Conference regular season champion Conference regular season and conference tournament champion Division regular season champion Division regular season and conference tournament champion Conference tournament champion

== Awards and honors ==
Award	Year
Football
Collier's Weekly Second-Team All-America	1922
