= Newsh Bentz =

American college football player and coach (1897–1967)

Biographical details
- Born: March 8, 1897; New Berlin, Pennsylvania, U.S.
- Died: August 19, 1967 (aged 70); Allentown, Pennsylvania, U.S.

Playing career
- 1920–1922: Penn State
- Position: Center

Coaching career (HC unless noted)

Football
- 1923: Mansfield
- 1924–1925: Shippensburg
- 1927–1928: Shippensburg

Basketball
- 1923–1924: Mansfield
- 1927–1929: Shippensburg

Head coaching record
- Overall: 24–15–2 (football)

Accomplishments and honors

Awards
- All-American (1922)

Harry Newsham "Newsh" Bentz (March 8, 1897 – August 19, 1967) was an American college football player and coach. He was the starting center and team captain for the 1922 Penn State Nittany Lions football team, and earned a selection on the 1922 College Football All-America Team. Bentz served as the head football coach at the Mansfield Normal School (now known as Mansfield University of Pennsylvania) in 1923 and State Teachers College at Shippensburg (now known as Shippensburg University of Pennsylvania) from 1924 to 1925 and 1927 to 1928, compiling a career head coaching record of 24–15–2.

Bentz was born on March 8, 1897, to Martin S. and Elsie Potts Bentz. After his coaching career, he was a businessman and civic leader in Allentown, Pennsylvania. He died on August 19, 1967, in Allentown.
