= Mike Gulian =

American football player (1900–1970)

Profile
- Position: Tackle

Personal information
- Born: July 29, 1900; Marash, Ottoman Empire
- Died: January 10, 1970 (aged 69); Newton, Massachusetts, U.S.
- Listed height: 6 ft 0 in (1.83 m)
- Listed weight: 205 lb (93 kg)

Career information
- High school: Newton North (Newtonville, Massachusetts, U.S.)
- College: Brown

Career history
- Buffalo All-Americans (1923); Frankford Yellow Jackets (1924); Providence Steam Roller (1925–1927)

Awards and highlights
- First-team All-American (1922)
- Stats at Pro Football Reference

Milanese J. "Mike" Gulian (July 29, 1900 – January 10, 1970), sometimes known as the Armenian Prince, was an Ottoman-born American football player. He was a first-team All-American in 1922 and subsequently played five seasons in the National Football League (NFL) from 1923 to 1927. He was the first Armenian-born player in the league.

Gulian was born in Marash in Western Armenia (then part of the Ottoman Empire), immigrated to the United States at a young age, and grew up in Newton, Massachusetts.

Gulian played college football at the tackle position for the Brown Bears football team and was captain of Brown's 1922 team. His play was reported to have been largely responsible for Brown's 3–0 victory over Harvard in 1922. He was selected by Athletic World magazine, Billy Evans, Lawrence Perry and the Romelke Press Clipping Bureau as a first-team tackle on the 1922 College Football All-America Team. His total of 97 votes in the Romelke poll was the fifth highest that year.

Gulian also played five seasons in the NFL for the Buffalo All-Americans (1923), Frankford Yellow Jackets (1924), and Providence Steam Roller (1925–1927).

After retiring from football, Gulian worked for the Equitable Life Assurance Company in Boston. During World War II, he served in the United States Army for 10 months and then with the American Red Cross in India for three years. Gulian died in 1970 at his home in Newton, Massachusetts.
