= Joe Setron =

American football player (1900–1958)

Profile
- Position: Guard

Personal information
- Born: August 10, 1900; Buffalo, New York, U.S.
- Died: September 25, 1958 (aged 58); Cleveland, Ohio, U.S.
- Listed height: 5 ft 9 in (1.75 m)
- Listed weight: 195 lb (88 kg)

Career information
- High school: Parkersburg (Parkersburg, West Virginia)
- College: West Virginia

Career history
- Cleveland Indians (1923)

Awards and highlights
- Second-team All-American (1922)
- Stats at Pro Football Reference

Joseph Louis Setron (August 10, 1900 – September 25, 1958) was an American football guard. He played college football for the West Virginia Mountaineers and was named a second-team All-American by Collier's Weekly (Walter Camp) in 1922.

== Early life ==
Joseph Louis Setron was born on August 10, 1900, in Buffalo, New York. He attended Parkersburg High School in Parkersburg, West Virginia.

== College career ==
Setron enrolled at West Virginia University (WVU) to play college football for the Mountaineers. He was a four-year letterman from 1919 to 1922. He named a second-team All-American at guard by Collier's Weekly (Walter Camp) in 1922. Setron also earned All-American honors from Billy Evans National Honor Roll. He wrestled for the Mountaineers as well.

== Professional career ==
Setron played in one game for the Cleveland Indians of the National Football League in 1923 as a reserve guard. He also spent some time with the independent Ashland Armcos later in the 1920s.

== Post-playing career ==
In 1924, Setron was the head football coach at Cameron High School in Cameron, West Virginia. He became the freshman football coach at WVU in 1925. He was an assistant football coach at John Carroll University from 1928 to 1930. In March 1931, Setron resigned from John Carroll to focus on his printing business. By 1958, he was a partner in the Welded Construction & Engineering Co. in Cleveland. He died on September 25, 1958, in Cleveland after a long illness.
