= Charles Buell =

American football player and educator (1900–1964)

Profile
- Position: Quarterback

Personal information
- Born: January 21, 1900; Hartford, Connecticut, U.S.
- Died: June 14, 1964 (aged 64); Concord, New Hampshire, U.S.

Career information
- College: Harvard College

Awards and highlights
- First-team All-American (1922)

Charles Chauncey Buell (January 21, 1900 – June 14, 1964) was an American football player and educator.

Buell was born in Hartford, Connecticut, and attended the Pomfret School. He enlisted in the United States Marine Corps at age 18 during World War I. After his discharge from the military, Buell enrolled at Harvard College. He played college football at the quarterback position for the Harvard Crimson football team from 1919 to 1922 and was selected as captain of Harvard's 1922 team. and was selected by Athletic World magazine, Billy Evans, Norman E. Brown, and the Romelke Press Clipping Bureau as a first-team quarterback on the 1922 College Football All-America Team. Buell also played for the Harvard baseball team.

After graduating from Harvard, Buell became a teacher. He taught history at Trinity College in Hartford and then became head of the history department at Milton Academy. He also served as an assistant football coach at Harvard while pursuing graduate studies there. Buell later served as the headmaster at Greenwich Country Day School from 1941 to 1943. In 1943, he joined the faculty of St. Paul's School in Concord, New Hampshire. He served as head of the department of public affairs at St. Paul's from 1943 until his death in 1964.

Buell and his wife, Eleanor had a son, Charles C. Buell.
