= Marty Below =

American football player (1899–1984)

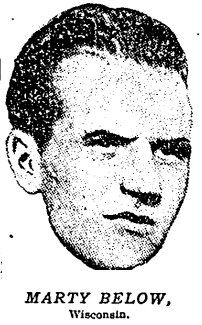

Wisconsin Badgers
- Position: Tackle

Personal information
- Born: January 26, 1899; Oshkosh, Wisconsin, U.S.
- Died: June 30, 1984 (aged 85); Evanston, Illinois, U.S.

Career information
- College: Wisconsin–Oshkosh; Wisconsin–Madison (1922–1923)

Awards and highlights
- Consensus All-American (1923); Third-team All-American (1922); 2× First-team All-Big Ten (1922, 1923)
- College Football Hall of Fame

Martin Paul Below (January 26, 1899 – June 30, 1984) was an American football player. He played at the tackle for the Wisconsin Badgers football team and was selected as a consensus All-American in 1923. He was inducted into the College Football Hall of Fame in 1988.

== Early life ==
Below was born in Oshkosh, Wisconsin, in 1899. He played basketball and football at Oshkosh High School and served in the United States Marine Corps during World War I.

== University of Wisconsin ==
After being discharged from the military, Below attended the Oshkosh State Teachers College (later renamed the University of Wisconsin–Oshkosh) where he played football and basketball. In 1922, Below transferred to the University of Wisconsin at Madison. He played at the tackle position for the Wisconsin Badgers football team in 1922 and 1923. At the end of the 1922 season, Below was selected as a first-team All-American by the New York Tribune and Norman E. Brown, a third-team All-American by Walter Camp, and a first-team All-Western player by Walter Eckersall of the Chicago Daily Tribune.

At the team banquet in late November 1922, the Wisconsin players chose Below as the captain of the 1923 team. During the 1923 season, the Badgers played Red Grange's Fighting Illini to a scoreless tie. Grange later called Below "the greatest lineman that I ever played against". In picking Below for his all-time team, Grange in 1926 said, "We always avoided his side of the line, knowing that we could gain nothing through him." At the end of the 1923 season, Below was selected as a consensus member of the 1923 College Football All-America Team. He received first-team honors from Athletic World magazine (chosen by 500 coaches), Football World magazine, Norman E. Brown, and Davis J. Walsh, sports editor for the International News Service.

== Later years ==
In February 1924, Below announced that, despite receiving multiple offers, he would not play professional football. He concluded his class work at the end of the fall semester in 1923 and stated that he intended to pursue a career in business. He appeared at a Madison gymnasium with a written offer from the manager of one of the top professional teams, tore it up, and threw it in a waste basket, stating: "No one loves to play football any better than I do, but in my opinion there is no comparison between college and professional football. I have completed my work in college and therefore I have played my last game."

Below was employed until 1948 by Commonwealth Edison in Chicago. From the late 1940s through the early 1970s, he was employed by the Kieffer-Nolde Engraving Company in Chicago. He was president of the Wisconsin Alumni Association. He died in 1984 at Evanston, Illinois.

Below was inducted into the College Football Hall of Fame in 1988. He was also inducted into the University of Wisconsin Athletic Hall of Fame in 1992.
