= Edgar Garbisch =

American college footballer (1899–1979)

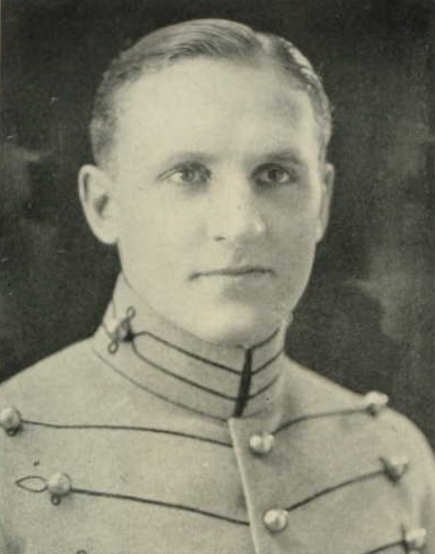

No. 10
- Positions: Center, guard

Personal information
- Born: April 7, 1899; La Porte, Indiana, U.S.
- Died: December 13, 1979 (aged 80); Cambridge, Maryland, U.S.
- Listed height: 6 ft 0 in (1.83 m)
- Listed weight: 185 lb (84 kg)

Career information
- College: Washington & Jefferson (1917–1920); Army (1921–1924)

Awards and highlights
- Consensus All-American (1922); First-team All-American (1924); Third-team All-American (1923)
- College Football Hall of Fame (Class of 1954)

Edgar William Garbisch (April 7, 1899 – December 13, 1979) was an American college football player, military officer, businessman and art collector. He played eight years of college football at Washington & Jefferson College (1917–1920) and the United States Military Academy (1921–1924) and was an All-American each year from 1922 to 1924. He was inducted to the College Football Hall of Fame in 1954.

Garbisch was the sales manager of the Postum cereal company in the late 1920s and early 1930s and president of Cellulose Products Corp. and Tisch Inc., in the 1930s. During World War II, he served as a colonel in the U.S. Army and was responsible for directing all military construction in New England and New York, including 39 Army airfields and embarkation camps. From 1945 to 1971, he was affiliated with Grocery Store Products, Inc., first as president and then as chief executive officer and chairman.

Garbisch was married for more than 50 years to Bernice Chrysler, the daughter of Chrysler founder Walter P. Chrysler, and they became important art collectors. Their collection of American Naïve art paintings, consisting of more than 2,600 pieces, was considered the most comprehensive ever assembled with much of it being given to museums during their lifetimes.

== Early life ==
Garbisch was born in La Porte, Indiana in 1899. His parents were Henry Christian and Sophia Carolina Garbisch. He attended Washington High School in Washington, Pennsylvania, played at the tackle position on the school's football team and was also a "star tennis player."

== College football ==
Garbisch enrolled at Washington & Jefferson College in the fall of 1917. He played football and tennis all four years at Washington & Jefferson and was captain of the college's 1920 football team. Garbisch received a Bachelor of Arts degree from Washington & Jefferson in 1921.

Garbisch next enrolled at the United States Military Academy in July 1921. While attending the Military Academy, he played at the center, guard and place-kicker position for the Army Black Knights football team from 1921 to 1924. He was credited with developing the "roving center method" of playing defensive football in 1921.

In 1922, he helped lead Army to an 8–0–2 record, and he kicked a 47-yard field goal from a placement near the sideline to give Army a 17–14 victory over rival Navy. At the end of the 1922 season, Garbisch was selected as a consensus All-American, receiving first-team honors from Walter Camp, the New York Tribune, Norman E. Brown, and the Romelke Press Clipping Bureau.

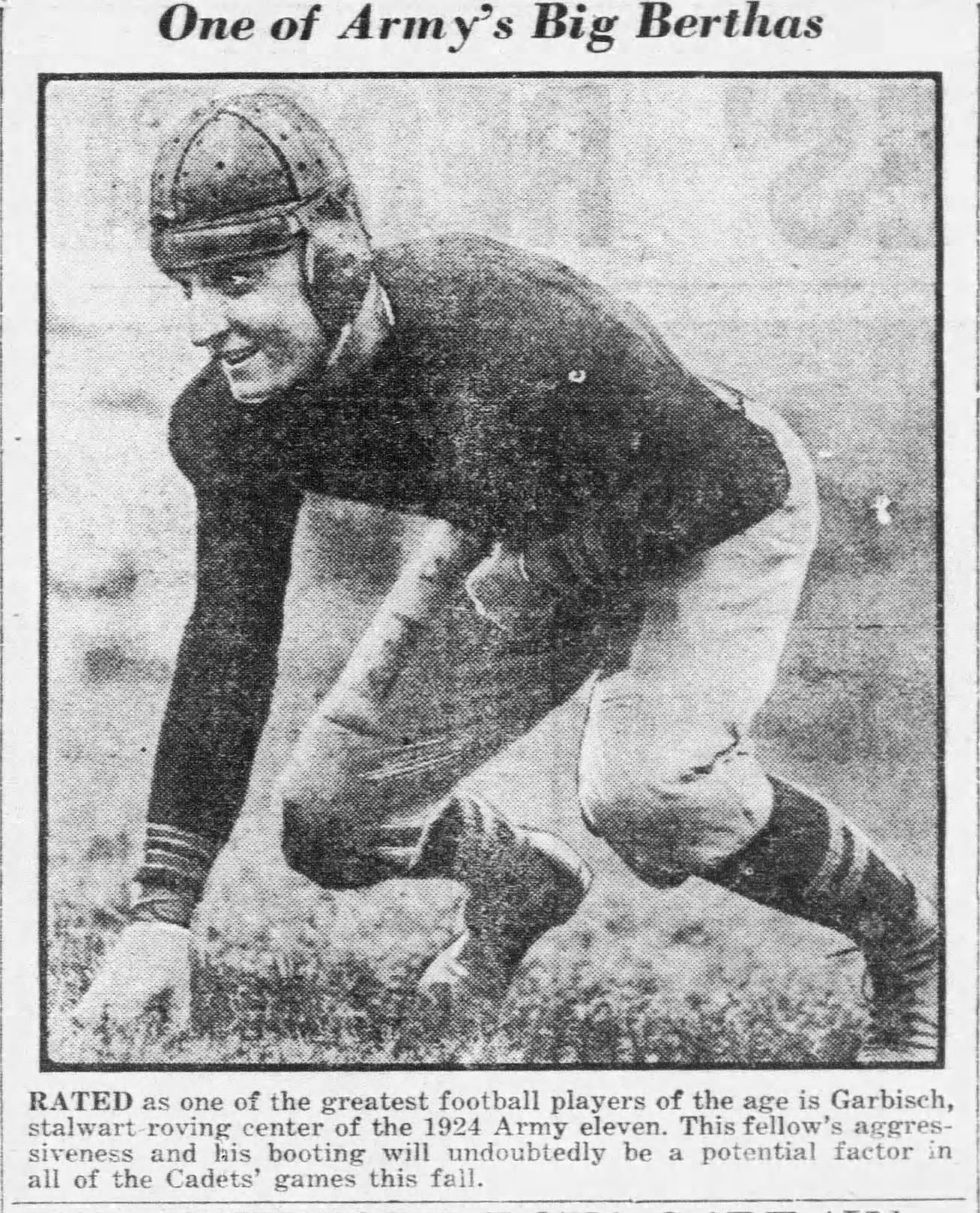
Garbisch featured in a 1923 New York Daily News photograph as one of the stars of the Cadets

In 1923, he was again selected as a first-team All-American by Tom Thorp, for the Baltimore News, and Percy Haughton. Garbisch also received second-team All-American honors from Athletic World magazine, selected based on votes cast by 500 coaches, and Davis J. Walsh, sports editor for the International News Service.

On November 30, 1924, with President Calvin Coolidge in attendance at the annual Army–Navy Game, Garbisch kicked four field goals to lead Army to a 12–0 victory over Navy. Playing at the roving center position, he also "intercepted navy passes, brought navy runners to earth, smashed the interference to shreds." After the game, Grantland Rice wrote:

Ed Garbisch, the big Army captain, used his big right toe as a flaming howitzer today in the Baltimore Stadium and beat the Navy singlehanded as 80,000 people looked down upon the field of war. . . . For it was Garbisch 12 and Navy 0 . . . He had, after the early misses, been adjusting his famous toe to the proper range with care and coolness.

At the end of the 1924 season, he was selected as a first-team All-American by Walter Camp, International News Service, Liberty magazine, Newspaper Enterprise Association, Billy Evans, Davis J. Walsh, and Walter Eckersall for the Chicago Tribune.

Garbisch was also the captain of the Army tennis team while at West Point and competed in the 1925 Wimbledon tournament. He was the Military Academy's tennis champion for four consecutive years and reportedly "played in all the major invitation tennis tournaments." Garbisch graduated from the U.S. Military Academy in 1925 ranked 17th in a class of 245 cadets.

== Later life ==
After graduating from the Military Academy, Garbisch was commissioned as a lieutenant and assigned to the Fifteenth Engineers at Fort Humphrey, Virginia. In December 1925, President Calvin Coolidge accepted Garbisch's resignation from the Army, and Garbisch announced his intention to pursue a career in business.

Beginning in 1926, Garbisch was employed by the Postum cereal division of General Food Sales Co. By 1930, he had been promoted to sales manager of the Postum division.

Garbisch married Bernice Chrysler, daughter of Walter P. Chrysler, on January 4, 1930. Garbisch was the president of Cellulose Products Corp. from 1931 to 1935 and president and chairman of Tisch Inc. (later Kernap Inc.) from 1933 to 1942.

In 1937, Garbisch became a director of Grocery Store Products Co. He rejoined the Army during World War II, receiving promotions to major in March 1942, lieutenant colonel in December 1942 and colonel in May 1944. He served for four years from January 1942 to December 1945 as an engineer responsible for directing all military construction in New England and New York, including 39 Army airfields and embarkation camps.

During halftime of the 1943 Army-Navy football game, Lt. Col. Ed Garbisch and Navy Capt. Steve Barchet participated in a light-hearted live broadcast for the war effort introduced by NBC Sports radio broadcaster Bill Stern. Garbisch was flying overhead aboard an Army bomber while Barchet was patrolling offshore in a Navy submarine. Both men had played in the 1923 Army-Navy game, which ended in a 0–0 tie after each of the men had missed a field goal attempt. Since the 1943 game was also tied 0–0 at halftime, each man wagered that their own academy would prevail in the second half. Barchet offered to eat Garbisch's hat if Army won, while Garbisch in turn offered to present his backside to the horns of the Navy goat mascot if Navy won. Navy ended up winning 13–0, and Barchet later released Garbisch from the obligation of their humorous wager.

After leaving the military at the end of 1945, Garbisch returned to Grocery Store Products, Inc. He served as its president from 1945 to 1947 and chairman and chief executive officer from 1947 to 1971. In February 1946, Garbisch was presented the Legion of Merit for his World War II service by the Chief of the United States Army Corps of Engineers, Lt. Gen. R. A. Wheeler.

In 1954, Garbisch was inducted into the College Football Hall of Fame. In 1959, he was also inducted into the Helms Athletic Foundation's college football hall of fame. In 1971, Grocery Store Products, Inc., merged with and became a subsidiary of The Clorox Company.

Garbisch died from a stroke at the Dorchester County General Hospital in Cambridge, Maryland, in December 1979 after a long illness. His wife died at their home several hours later. After a funeral service at St. Bartholomew's Episcopal Church in Manhattan on December 19, 1979, Garbisch and his wife were interred in the Chrysler family mausoleum at Sleepy Hollow Cemetery, Westchester County, New York.

== Art collection ==
Garbisch and his wife were well known art collectors. They had a widely recognized collection of American furniture and paintings, American and European brass and wrought iron fixtures, and European and Chinese porcelain. Their collection of American Naïve art paintings, consisting of more than 2,600 pieces, was considered the most comprehensive ever assembled at the time of their death. During their lifetimes, much of their collection of Naïve art was donated to museums, including the National Gallery of Art, Metropolitan Museum of Art, Philadelphia Museum of Art, Baltimore Museum of Art, Chrysler Museum of Art, and Flint Institute of Arts. A smaller collection of paintings, including Picasso's "Seated Acrobat with Folded Arms," was sold at auction in May 1980 for $14.8 million—then a record for any auction in the United States.
