= Bernard Kirk =

American football player (1900–1922)

Bernard C. Kirk
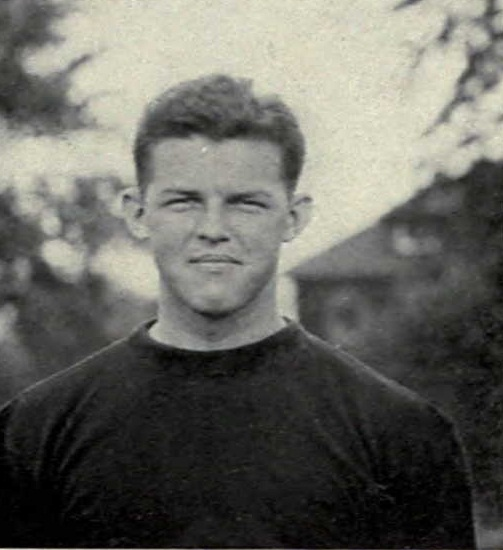
- Bernard Kirk cropped from 1922 Michigan football team photograph
- Born: May 8, 1900; Ypsilanti, Michigan, U.S.
- Died: December 23, 1922 (aged 22); Ypsilanti, Michigan, U.S.
- Education: University of Michigan
- Known for: College football player, All-American, 1922
- Football career

No. 7 – Michigan Wolverines
- Position: End

Career information
- College: Notre Dame (1918–1919); Michigan (1920–1922)

Bernard C. Kirk (May 8, 1900 – December 23, 1922) was an American football player who played for Notre Dame in 1919 and for Michigan from 1921 to 1922. He was selected as an All-American at the end position in both 1921 and 1922. Shortly after being named an All-American, in December 1922, at the height of his popularity, Kirk suffered a fractured skull in an automobile accident, and died several days later at a hospital in Ypsilanti, Michigan. His funeral was attended by the Governor of Michigan and many other dignitaries, and was reported by newspapers across the United States.

== Youth in Ypsilanti ==
Kirk was raised in Ypsilanti, Michigan and played football for three years for Ypsilanti High School. He was the only son of Gen. John P. Kirk, a prominent Ypsilanti attorney and former general in the Michigan National Guard.

== Notre Dame ==
After graduating from high school, Kirk enrolled at the University of Notre Dame, and played for the first Notre Dame football team coached by the legendary Knute Rockne. He played end for the 1918 and undefeated 1919 Fighting Irish teams. Kirk was selected by some critics for the All-Western team in 1919.

=== Gipp to Kirk ===
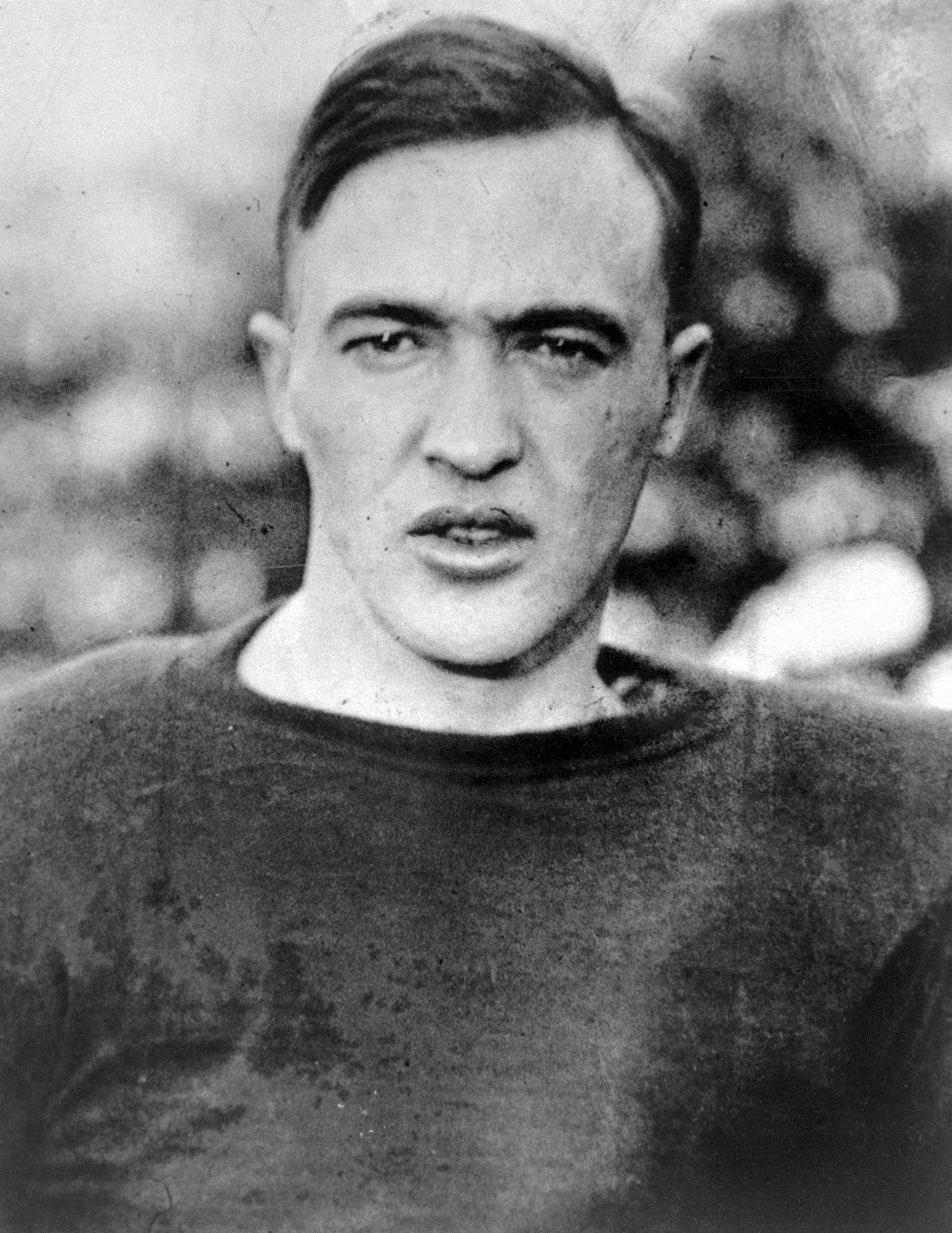
George Gipp (pictured) threw passes to Bernard Kirk at Notre Dame.

The Notre Dame team featured another Michiganian, George Gipp. The passing combination of Gipp at left halfback to Kirk at left end became one of the game's first, and one of Notre Dame's greatest offensive weapons. In October 1919, The Fort Wayne News and Sentinel praised "the ability of Kirk in receiving passes and breaking away for long runs." In early November 1919, Kirk drew attention for his work in Notre Dame's win over Indiana. The Indianapolis Star praised the team's end play

The Irish wing men are wonderful performers. Either Kirk or Anderson can snag the ball out of the air on forward passes with great skill. Both are fast and wonderful defensive men. It was seldom in Saturday's game that either was boxed. They broke up what little interference Indiana displayed and got through to their man time after time.

In late November, Notre Dame defeated Purdue 33-13, and the Indiana Star reported that the Boilermakers would have finished on top had it not been for the passing attack of Gipp and Kirk. Kirk scored two touchdowns against Purdue, and the Star noted: "Some of the passes completed by Gipp and Kirk were of the sensational order. Two touchdowns resulted from passes, Gipp to Kirk ..." At the end of the 1919 season, the Indianapolis Sunday Star named Gipp and Kirk to its All-Indiana team, two of the four Notre Dame players to be so honored in 1919. The Star wrote of Kirk

In every game the Irish have competed in this season, Kirk has been a star. His uncanny ability to camp under forward passes gives him a call on the eleven. Not only that, but he was down the field fast under punts and played a great defensive game.

== Michigan ==
=== Transfer from Notre Dame ===
In September 1920, Notre Dame coach Knute Rockne expressed concern when his two Michiganian stars, Gipp and Kirk, who failed to report to the team's fall practice. While Gipp returned to South Bend, Kirk transferred to the University of Michigan. Rockne later recalled that Kirk and Gipp had been "practically inseparable" and reflected on his disappointment in losing the talented Kirk. Rockne said of Kirk:

He was the apple of my eye. Kirk played with Notre Dame a couple of seasons before he entered Michigan and not one was more sorry to see him go to the Wolverines than I was. He played with Notre Dame when Gipp was at his best and the forward pass combination from Gipp to Kirk could not be beaten on any team.

Kirk starred on Michigan's freshman team in 1920, but was ineligible to play on Michigan's varsity team in his first year after transferring.

=== 1921 season ===
In 1921, Kirk was a starter at the end position in six of Michigan's seven games. However, he was unable to play in the season's final game against Minnesota due to an ankle injury sustained in the game against Wisconsin. At the end of the 1921 season, Kirk was selected as a first-team end on the All Western football team. He was also the only Michigan player selected as a first-team player on the Harp's All-American Team. Walter Camp picked Kirk for "Honorable Mention" honors on his 1921 All-American team.

=== 1922 season ===
Kirk's greatest success came in the 1922 football season, and his biggest play came in a 24-0 win over Illinois. At the start of the third quarter, Kirk ran a kickoff back 80 yards for a touchdown. Syndicated columnist Billy Evans wrote that Kirk's 80-yard run "through the entire Illinois team" was "the most spectacular play performed by a Michigan player this year," and "one of the most brilliant feats of the year." Kirk also recovered a fumbled punt in the second quarter at the Illinois 18-yard-line that led to another Michigan touchdown. Columnist Evans wrote that Kirk was "directly and indirectly responsible" for all 24 points scored by Michigan against Illinois. After the Illinois game, Kirk reportedly left the stadium before the crowd and spent several hours hunting in the woods outside of Ann Arbor.

Another columnist, writing under the name "Roundy," wrote that Kirk gave him "an eye full," turning plays "so fast that the thing is looked up in the stands as a joke." Roundy continued in his praise of Kirk as follows

As soon as Kirk grabs a pass he becomes a halfback with his speed and trick running. His run on the kickoff through the whole Illinois team proved that, for an end, he is all over the field and has a nose for fumbles, is strong and tricky. There is no such thing as boxing this bird. Kirk, and his tackling of receivers of punts is a beautiful thing to see. So the ends are the strongest spot on the team. These two birds can play on my team any time, any place, anywhere, and at any price.

=== All-American selections ===
At the end of the 1922 season, Kirk was selected as a first-team end on several All-Western and All-American teams. Harold Johnson of the Chicago American wrote that Kirk "stands out" among the ends

Virtually every coach, critic and student of the pastime is agreed upon the choice of Bernie Kirk, left end of the undefeated Michigan machine. Yost's star was good in every respect that a flanker could be. Not only was he one of the most deadly tacklers in the circuit, but he was shifty and fleet in streaking down the field to nail the receivers of forward passes or punts. He shone, too, at stopping end plays directed at him and was without a superior at spearing aerial shots from his comrades.

The Capital Times from Wisconsin picked Kirk as the best end in the west and noted, "The Wolverine flank protected by Kirk is one of the strongest in the country. Little has been gained around him, while on the offense his backs have had plenty of success -- thanks to Kirk who helps pave the way." The Iowa City Press-Citizen wrote that Kirk "seems to stand out by himself" among the ends, noting that he "attracted most attention for his receiving of passes and his deadly spilling of interference."

Billy Evans picked Kirk for his 1922 "National Honor Roll," and credited Kirk's performance to physical conditioning

Bernie Kirk of Michigan was the leading end of the west this year. ... Condition made Kirk a star. He lacked condition in 1921. At that time he was just as able, otherwise as this year. But nobody mentioned him and he did nothing much to help his team. Kirk realized why he failed in 1921 and immediately began preparing for the season of 1922. Careful diet, regular hours and well-planned exercise brought him into remarkable condition. Kirk was fit when the training season started. Kirk played every minute of every game he started this year. He never had time taken out. He was really a physical marvel, considering how hard he played.

Kirk was acclaimed as a first-team All-American at the end position by the New York Tribune and by noted sports writers, including Walter Eckersall of the Chicago Tribune and Fred Hayner of the Chicago Daily News. When the dean of football critics, Walter Camp, named Kirk to his second team and selected little known end Taylor of Navy to his first team, charges of Eastern bias were leveled at Camp. An Illinois newspaper wrote the following about Camp's omission of Kirk

The fact that eastern football did not demonstrate any great superiority over the other sections of the country is not going to help justify the selection of seven eastern men. The failure of Kirk to win a place will come as a great surprise. Kirk is one of the best ends the 'Big Ten' has produced in years. It was felt certain that he would be selected. Most of the critics picked Kirk and Muller as the ends. Camp gives Taylor of Annapolis the preference over Kirk.

One Ohio columnist wrote that his paper printed Camp's All-American selections "with apologies" and called Camp's favoritism of eastern players "a positive travesty." None of the other major All-American selectors chose Taylor as a first-team All-American, and one California newspaper referred to Kirk as one of the greatest ends ever turned out in the Middle West

Kirk's remarkable showing with Michigan this season stamped him as one of the greatest ends ever turned out in the Middle West. He was named by a majority of sports writers throughout the country as All-America end. Walter Camp, however, placed Taylor of the Navy at end instead of Kirk, on his first team. Kirk was placed on the second team.

Billy Evans echoed the same sentiment

Kirk was unquestionably the best end the west, if not the country, has produced in years. As a defensive player, he was without a peer. He also was very proficient in handling the forward pass. Kirk starred in every game that Michigan played during the 1922 season. No one player meant more to the success of Yost's great eleven than Kirk. Every critic in the west selected Kirk on either the 'Big Ten' or middle west all-star teams. A great majority of the critics of the country placed him on their All-American elevens.

== Death from injuries sustained in automobile accident ==
In the early morning hours of Sunday, December 17, 1922, Kirk sustained a fractured skull and internal injuries in an automobile accident. Kirk and four others were returning to Ann Arbor after a night in Detroit when the car slid off the icy road and crashed into a telephone pole. The other four members of the party, including fellow Michigan football player Eddie Usher, were either uninjured or sustained only minor injuries. Kirk was taken to Beyer Memorial Hospital in Ypsilanti unconscious and in critical condition.

Over the next week, newspapers across the country followed the daily changes in Kirk's condition. On Sunday evening, Kirk remained unconscious and doctors expressed fear for his recovery. Early in the week, Kirk's condition was much improved, and Kirk's father reported that physicians had told him that his son would recover. Doctors also reported that Kirk's right eye had been badly injured, but it was thought that his sight would not be impaired.

The press also reported closely on the investigation into the cause of the crash. Initial reports indicated that the automobile, owned by Harold Covert but being driven by Cyrenus Darling, was speeding on the icy road. But after an investigation, Ypsilanti Police Chief John F. Connor reported that the accident was "unavoidable" and caused by the icy condition of the road. Chief Connor said the vehicle was not being driven at an unlawful speed, and witnesses told him it was moving at 30 to 35 miles per hour.

Kirk suffered what was reported as a "slight relapse" on Wednesday. The United Press reported that Kirk's pulse was down, and doctors expressed fears that meningitis might develop and described his condition as "not so good." Doctors hoped that Kirk's "fine physical condition will pull him through," and his condition improved again on Thursday.

After an up-and-down week, meningitis set in, and Kirk died on Saturday morning, December 23, 1922. On learning of Kirk's passing, Kirk's teammate Harry Kipke told reporters, "Bernie Kirk was one of the best liked boys that ever wore a Michigan uniform. He was one of the greatest ends the University ever had, and he was a real fellow in every respect."

Hundreds of telegrams of condolence were sent to the family "from all parts of the world," including one from Walter Camp, which read

Deepest regrets and sympathy. We shall not soon forget the remarkable play on the gridiron of Bernard Kirk, a star indeed and one of those indefatigable performers combining both brain and physique with speed and judgment, a fine example of real football players.

Many newspapers noted the coincidence that Kirk and George Gipp, former teammates and close friends, had both died even before all of the All-American teams had been announced (Gipp had died in December 1920). Notre Dame Coach Rockne recalled that Gipp and Kirk had been "great pals" and "practically inseparable." A Wisconsin newspaper made the following observation

[Kirk] had played end on the Notre Dame eleven before coming to Michigan, and the death of Kirk marks the passing of that ill fated but brilliant Notre Dame combination of Gipp to Kirk. Like Kirk, George Gipp, died in the height of his stardom, just after the close of a season in which he was picked by most critics for the all-American. As a member of the Notre Dame team Kirk played end and received most of the passes hurled by Gipp.

== Funeral ==
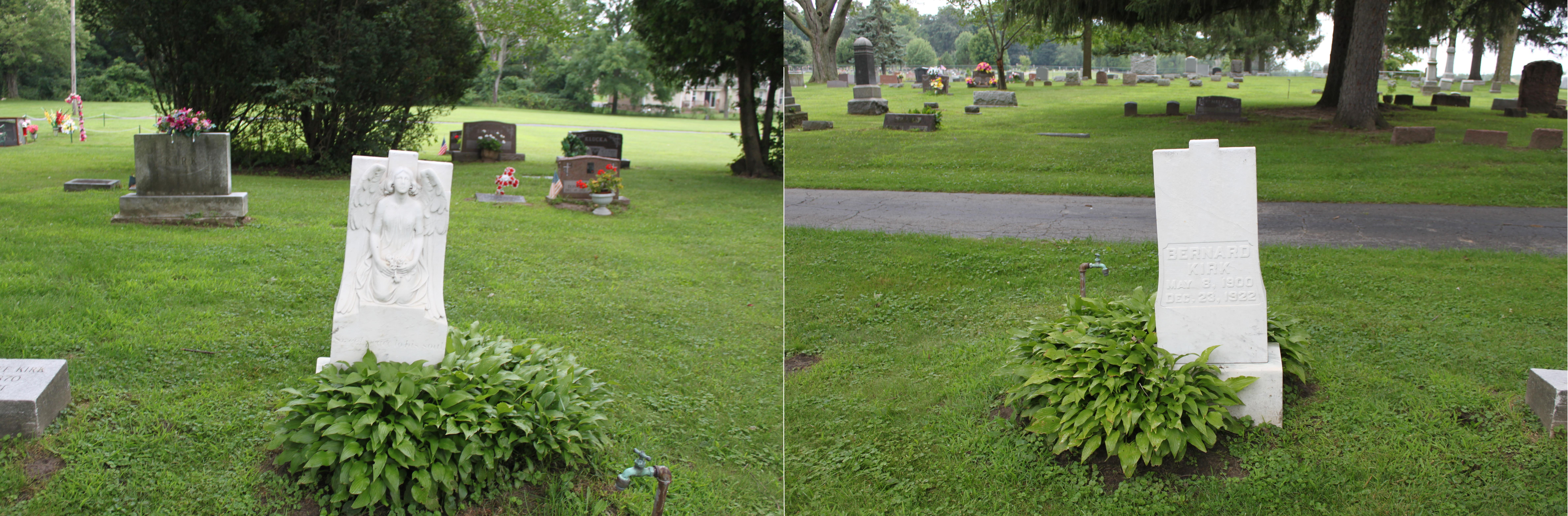
Kirk grave, St. John Cemetery

Kirk's funeral, held in Ypsilanti, was covered by newspapers across the United States. The New York Times reported: "High officials of the State and the educational world, as well as gridiron stars of this and other years, gathered here today to pay the last honors to Bernard Kirk, star football player of the University of Michigan, whose death resulted Saturday from an automobile accident." A requiem mass was held at St. John's Catholic Church, which "could not accommodate a tenth of those attending the services." Kirk's honorary pallbearers included University of Michigan President Marion Leroy Burton, Michigan Governor Alex Groesbeck, University of Michigan Coach Fielding H. Yost, and two U.S. Congressmen. His casket was carried to the grave by eight of his Michigan teammates, including Harry Kipke, Paul G. Goebel, Irwin Uteritz, and Franklin Cappon. One account described the emotion of the funeral: "As the casket bearing the body of the former University of Michigan football star was slowly lowered into his last resting place, husky athletes who battled with him on the football fields for the glory and honor of Michigan sobbed unashamed." That last resting place is St. John Cemetery in Ypsilanti.

== See also ==
- 1922 College Football All-America Team
- List of Michigan Wolverines football All-Americans
