= John Thurman (American football) =

American football player (1900–1976)

John C. Thurman
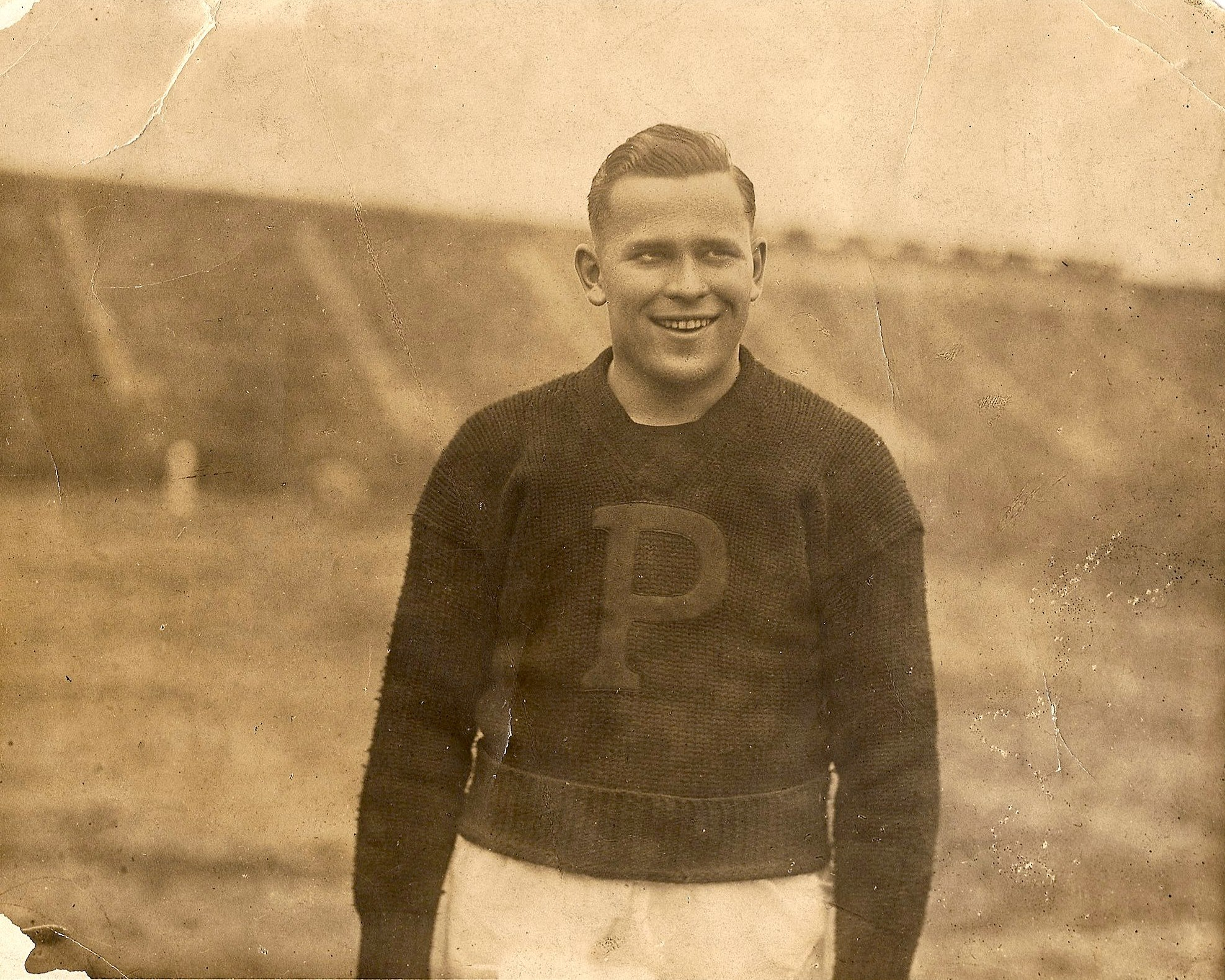
- Thurman, circa 1922

No. 12
- Position: Tackle

Personal information
- Born: February 9, 1900; Pasadena, California, U.S.
- Died: March 5, 1976 (aged 76); Pasadena, California, U.S.
- Listed height: 6 ft 1 in (1.85 m)
- Listed weight: 225 lb (102 kg)

Career information
- College: Penn

Career history
- Los Angeles Buccaneers (1926)

Awards and highlights
- 2nd team all-NFL GB Press-Gazette (1926); Consensus All-American (1922)
- Stats at Pro Football Reference

John Cochran Thurman (February 9, 1900 – March 5, 1976) was an American professional football player who was a tackle for the Los Angeles Buccaneers during their only season in the National Football League (NFL), in 1926. He grew up in Pasadena, California, before attending the University of Pennsylvania. Playing college football for the Penn Quakers, Thurman received All-American honors in 1922.

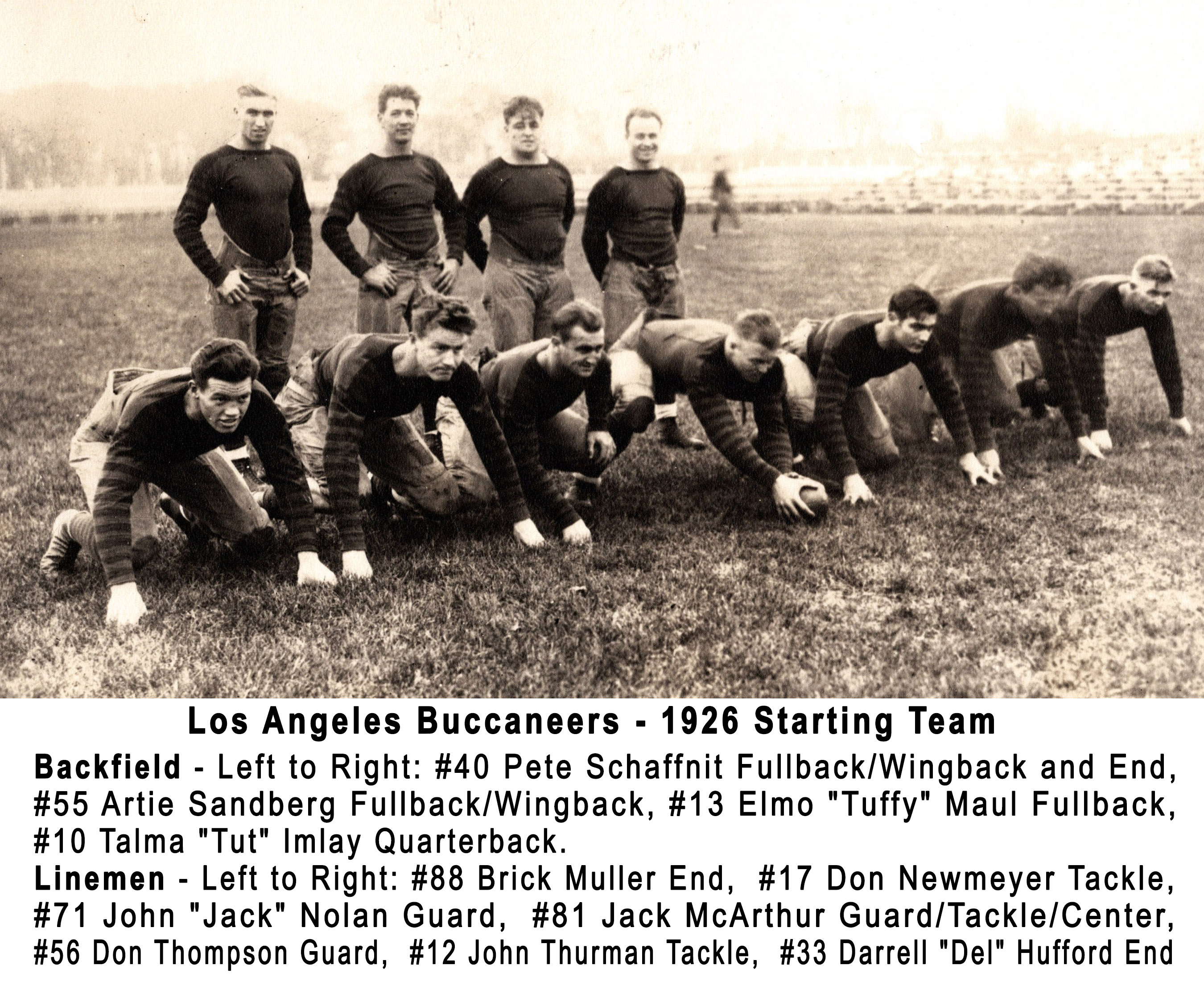
1924 Los Angeles Buccaneers starting team
