= Jimmy Robertson (American football) =

American football player and coach (1901–1974)

Biographical details
- Born: March 8, 1901; Aberdeen, Scotland
- Died: December 31, 1974 (aged 73); Akron, Ohio, U.S.

Playing career
- c. 1920: Carnegie Tech
- 1924–1925: Akron Pros
- Positions: Fullback, halfback

Coaching career (HC unless noted)
- 1933: Geneva

Head coaching record
- Overall: 7–3

Accomplishments and honors

Championships
- 1 Tri-State (1933)

James A. Robertson (March 8, 1901 – December 31, 1974) was an American football player and coach.

== Playing career ==
=== Carnegie Tech ===
After playing high school football in Allegheny, Pennsylvania, Robertson was expected to go to West Point. Instead, he went on to college and played college football at Carnegie Institute of Technology in Pittsburgh, Pennsylvania (now called Carnegie Mellon University). Under coach Walter Steffen, the squad played teams such as Notre Dame, Georgia Tech, Purdue, Michigan State, and USC. Robertson was team captain and proved instrumental to several key victories in school history. He is considered one of the best players in the history of the school.

=== Akron Pros ===
After college, Robertson played for the Akron Pros of the National Football League (NFL) in 1924 and 1925. under head coaches Wayne Brenkert and Scotty Bierce He played for 16 games for Akron, recording statistics on both offense and defense.

== Coaching career ==
Robertson was the 16th head football coach at Geneva College located in Beaver Falls, Pennsylvania and he held that position for the 1933 season-the original plan was for him to coach at Geneva for only one year. His coaching record at Geneva was 6–3 Robertson's first game as head coach was a 47 to 0 victory over the California Teacher's College in Pennsylvania. After one season, Robertson was expected to be retained as head coach as late as January 1934.

== Head coaching record ==
Year	Team	Overall	Conference	Standing	Bowl/playoffs
Geneva Covenanters (Tri-State Conference) (1933)
1933	Geneva	7–3	4–0	1st	
Geneva:		7–3	4–0		
Total:		7–3			
National championship Conference title Conference division title or championship game berth
