= Fiske Brown =

American athlete (1901–1978)

Profile
- Position: Guard

Personal information
- Born: June 13, 1901; Plymouth, Massachusetts, U.S.
- Died: May 30, 1978 (aged 76); Brockton, Massachusetts, U.S.

Career information
- College: Harvard College

Career history
- 1920–1921: Harvard

Awards and highlights
- Consensus All-American (1921)

John Fiske Brown (June 13, 1901 – May 30, 1978) was an American athlete who participated in American football, wrestling and track and field. He was a competitor in all three sports at Harvard University and a consensus All-American in football.

Brown was raised in Plymouth, Massachusetts, and attended preparatory school at Andover where he was a member of the football, wrestling and track teams.

As a guard for the Harvard Crimson football team, Browne was a consensus first-team selection for the 1921 College Football All-America Team. He was also captain of Harvard's wrestling team and a competitor in the heavyweight class. He was also the captain of the track and field team and a competitor in the shot put and hammer throw events. He set a record in the hammer throw for international meets between Yale, Harvard, Oxford and Cambridge with a distance of 159 feet, 4-3/4 inches.
