= Frank Schwab =

American football player (1898–1965)

Profile
- Position: Guard

Personal information
- Born: 1898; Madera, Pennsylvania, U.S.
- Died: December 12, 1965 (aged 66–67); Spangler, Pennsylvania, U.S.
- Listed height: 5 ft 11 in (1.80 m)
- Listed weight: 195 lb (88 kg)

Career information
- College: Lafayette (1919–1922)

Awards and highlights
- 2× Consensus All-American (1921, 1922)
- College Football Hall of Fame (Class of 1958)

Frank "Dutch" Schwab (1898 – December 12, 1965) was an American football player. He was elected to the College Football Hall of Fame in 1958.

== Lafayette ==
Schwab graduated from high school in 1912 and worked in coal mines until World War I, when he served as a sergeant in the Army. He played for a service team, where Jock Sutherland, coach of Lafayette College, saw him. He persuaded Schwab to enroll after the war. Schwab stood 5 ft 11 in (180 cm) and weighed 180 pounds (82 kg).

Schwab was the top man on the Lafayette Maroon and White line for four seasons, an intense lineman whose speed and agility were blended with a chess-player's gift of strategy. Schwab was known for an uncanny ability to "read" enemy plays, often stopping a runner's progress before he was able to hit the line of scrimmage. He was an All-American in 1921 and 1922, his junior and senior years, and captained the Maroon and White during his final campaign. As a scholar, Schwab was of honors caliber, also. The respect he enjoyed as a leader on the gridiron carried over into his campus lifestyle and his fellow students elected him to terms as president of his class, fraternity (Chi Phi), and the entire student body, as well as membership into the Knights of the Round Table, an upper classmen's honorary society.

== Coal mining ==
After college, Schwab became president of a Patton, Pennsylvania coal mining company and hardware firm.
