= Rollie Williams =

American athlete and coach (1897–1968)

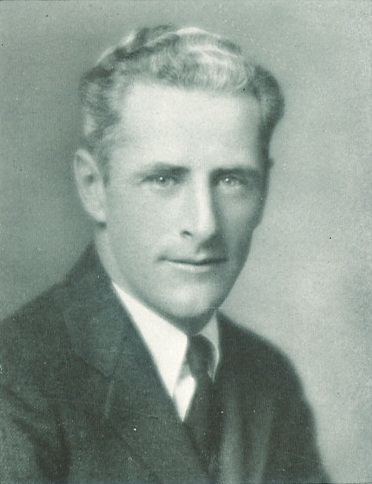
- Williams from 1941 Hawkeye

Biographical details
- Born: October 11, 1897; Edgerton, Wisconsin, U.S.
- Died: April 5, 1968 (aged 70); North Liberty, Iowa, U.S.

Playing career

Football
- 1920–1922: Wisconsin
- 1923: Racine Legion

Basketball
- 1920–1923: Wisconsin

Baseball
- c. 1920: Wisconsin
- Position: Halfback (football)

Coaching career (HC unless noted)

Football
- 1923: Millikin

Basketball
- 1923–1924: Millikin
- 1929–1942: Iowa
- 1950–1951: Iowa

Baseball
- 1924: Millikin

Head coaching record
- Overall: 4–5 (football); 149–143 (basketball); 1–6 (baseball)

Accomplishments and honors

Awards
- First-team All-Big Ten (1922); Wisconsin Athletic Hall of Fame (1960)

Rolland Franklin Williams (October 11, 1897 – April 5, 1968) was an American football, basketball, and baseball player and coach. He played professional football in the National Football League (NFL) for the Racine Legion in 1923. He played football, baseball and basketball at the University of Wisconsin–Madison. Williams was the head football, basketball, and baseball coach at Millikin University during the 1923–24 academic year. He served two stints as the head basketball coach at the University of Iowa, from 1929 to 1942 and again for the 1950–51 season. He was inducted in the Wisconsin Athletic Hall of Fame in 1960.

Williams was born in Edgerton, Wisconsin on October 11, 1897. He died on April 5, 1968, of a heart attack at his home in North Liberty, Iowa. Apart from a 40-month tour in the Navy during World War II, he spent 42 years at Iowa as an assistant coach (1924–1929), head coach (1929–1942 and 1950–1951) and assistant athletic director (1945–1966).

== Head coaching record ==
=== Football ===
Year	Team	Overall	Conference	Standing	Bowl/playoffs
Millikin Big Blue (Illinois Intercollegiate Athletic Conference / Midwest Conference) (1923)
1923	Millikin	4–5	4–4 / 1–0	T–11th / T–7th	
Millikin:		4–5	4–4		
Total:		4–5			

=== Basketball ===
Year	School	Record	Conference	Big Ten Rank
1929–30	Iowa	4–13	0–0*	10th
1930–31	Iowa	5–12	2–10	10th
1931–32	Iowa	5–12	3–9	T-8th
1932–33	Iowa	15–5	8–4	T-3rd
1933–34	Iowa	13–6	6–6	T-5th
1933–35	Iowa	10–9	6–6	6th
1935–36	Iowa	9–10	5–7	T-6th
1936–37	Iowa	11–9	3–9	T-8th
1937–38	Iowa	11–9	6–6	T-5th
1938–39	Iowa	8–11	3–9	10th
1939–40	Iowa	9–12	4–8	8th
1940–41	Iowa	12–8	4–8	8th
1941–42	Iowa	12–8	10–5	T-2nd
1950–51*	Iowa	15–7	9–5	3rd
Totals		139–131 (.515)	69–90 (.434)	
