= Wendell Taylor =

American football player (1899–1987)

Profile
- Position: End

Personal information
- Born: April 7, 1899
- Died: October 6, 1987 (aged 88)

Career information
- College: U.S. Naval Academy (1922)

Awards and highlights
- Consensus All-American (1922)

Wendell Smith Taylor (April 7, 1899 – October 6, 1987) was an American football player. He was raised in Oklahoma, and, in June 1919, he was admitted to the United States Naval Academy. At the academy, he played at the end position for the Navy Midshipmen football team. He was a consensus first-team selection to the 1922 College Football All-America Team. He also competed in track for the Naval Academy and has been inducted into the Navy Sports Hall of Fame. In his later years, he lived in Cookson, Oklahoma. He died in 1987 at the age of 88.
