= Fritz Breidster =

American football player (1900–1982)

Waldemar "Fritz" Breidster
Personal information
- Born: June 19, 1900; Milwaukee, Wisconsin, US
- Died: April 2, 1982 (aged 81); Milwaukee, Wisconsin, US

Career information
- College: United States Military Academy

Awards and highlights
- Consensus All-American (1922); 2× Third-team All-American (1920, 1921)

Waldemar "Fritz" Breidster (June 19, 1900 – April 2, 1982) was an American football player who played college football for the United States Military Academy at West Point.

Breidster was raised in Milwaukee, Wisconsin and graduated from East Division (Riverside) High School. After a year at the University of Wisconsin, Breidster enrolled in the U.S. Military Academy. Breidster was the captain of the undefeated 1922 Army football team. As a senior, Breidster was elected Cadet Captain of the academy—the highest office that can be given to a cadet. Breidster also competed for Army in swimming and water polo, winning letters three sports. He was captain of the football, swimming and water polo teams as a senior. He was also selected as a first-team All-American at the guard position by Athletic World magazine (selected by 214 coaches), Chicago Tribune writer Walter Eckersall, and Frank G. Menke. He was also selected by Billy Evans for his 1922 National Honor Roll (a selection of the best football players based on the votes of 200 sports editors).

After graduating from West Point, Breidster was assigned to the football coaching staff at Fort Mead in Maryland where he and Dwight Eisenhower were both assistant coaches.

In 1943, Breidster became the Commander of the 173rd Field Artillery Group, comprising five battalions. Later that year, he was assigned as a liaison officer with the Chinese Army in India, and eventually became Chief of Staff of the Chinese combat command. He directed the construction of a road through Burma that was completed in August 1945.

Breidster remained active in the Wisconsin National Guard after World War II, attaining the rank of brigadier general in 1947. He was later promoted to major general and retired from military service in 1960.

He was inducted into the Wisconsin Athletic Hall of Fame in 1979.

Breidster died in 1982 at age 81 at Columbia Hospital in Milwaukee.

== See also ==
- 1922 College Football All-America Team
