= Paul Minick =

American football player (1899–1978)

Profile
- Position: Guard

Personal information
- Born: December 17, 1899; Villisca, Iowa, U.S.
- Died: December 22, 1978 (aged 79); Springfield, Missouri, U.S.
- Listed height: 6 ft 0 in (1.83 m)
- Listed weight: 195 lb (88 kg)

Career information
- College: Iowa (1920–1922)

Career history
- Buffalo Bisons (1927); Green Bay Packers (1928–1929)

Awards and highlights
- NFL champion (1929); First-team All-American (1922); First-team All-Big Ten (1922)

Career NFL statistics
- Games played: 23

Paul Daniel Minick (December 17, 1899 – December 22, 1978) was an American football player and coach and film actor.

== Early life ==
Minick was born in 1899 at Villisca, Iowa. He attended West High School in Des Moines, Iowa.

== University of Iowa ==
Minick enrolled at the University of Iowa in 1919 and played college football for the Iowa Hawkeyes football teams from 1920 to 1922, including the undefeated 1921 and 1922 teams. At the end of the 1922 season, Minick won first-team honors on both the 1922 All-Big Ten Conference football team and the 1922 All-America college football team.

== USC coach and Hollywood actor ==
After graduating from Iowa, Minick moved to Los Angeles where he became an assistant coach for the 1925 USC Trojans football team. He served as the line coach under head coach Howard Jones who had previously coached Iowa while Minick was a player.

While in Los Angeles, Minick also acted in Hollywood movies, including College Days (1926), One Minute to Play (1926), Forever After (1926), The Poor Nut (1927), and The Drop Kick (1927). He also worked for a time as a gardener and caretaker of Gloria Swanson's estate in Beverly Hills.

== Professional football ==
Minick also played professional football beginning in 1926 with the New York Yankees of the American Football League. He also played for Red Grange's all-star professional football team in 1926. He then played three years in the National Football League (NFL), mostly at the guard position, for the Buffalo Bisons (1927) and Green Bay Packers (1928–1929). He was a member of the 1929 Green Bay Packers that won the NFL championship. In 1929, the Green Bay Press-Gazette praised his contributions to the club:

Paul is a smart line man and ... gained the distinction of being the Packers' leading guard. ... Minick follows the ball like a hawk. He seems to have a super football sense ... and often would pull out of his position and nail a carrier in his tracks.

Minick continued work in the Hollywood movie business in the off-season while playing for the Packers.

== Later life ==
Minick moved to Springfield, Missouri, in 1940 and worked as an insurance agent. His son, Peter David Minick, died in a car crash in 1957 while in college in Washington, DC. He died in Springfield in 1978 at age 79.
