= Gus Tebell =

American athlete, coach, and administrator (1897–1969)

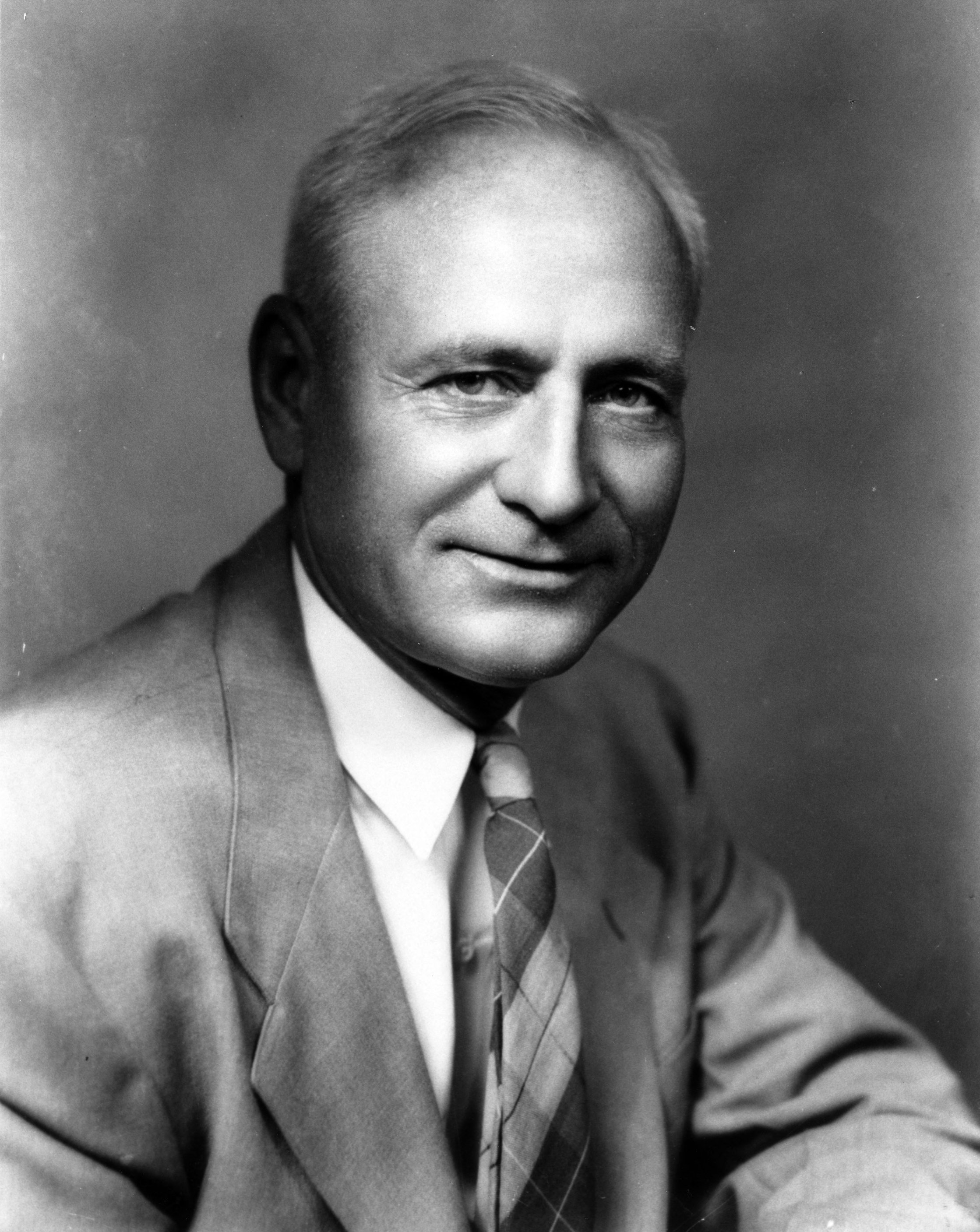
- Tebell, c. 1927

Biographical details
- Born: September 6, 1897; St. Charles, Illinois, U.S.
- Died: May 28, 1969 (aged 71); Richmond, Virginia, U.S.

Playing career

Football
- 1920–1922: Wisconsin
- 1923–1924: Columbus Tigers

Basketball
- 1920–1923: Wisconsin
- Positions: End (football); Guard (basketball)

Coaching career (HC unless noted)

Football
- 1923: Columbus Tigers
- 1924: NC State (assistant)
- 1925–1929: NC State
- 1930–19: Virginia (assistant)
- 1934–1936: Virginia

Basketball
- 1924–1929: NC State
- 1930–1951: Virginia

Baseball
- 1931–1942: Virginia
- 1944–1955: Virginia

Administrative career (AD unless noted)
- 1951–1962: Virginia

Head coaching record
- Overall: 2–0–1 (NFL); 27–43–6 (college football); 319–226 (college basketball); 266–189–9 (college baseball)

Accomplishments and honors

Championships
- Football; 1 SoCon (1927)

Awards
- First-team All-Pro (1923); All-American (1922); First-team All-Big Ten (1922); Second-team All-Big Ten (1921)

Gustave Kenneth Tebell (September 6, 1897 – May 28, 1969) was an American football, basketball, and baseball player, coach, and college athletics administrator. From 1925 to 1929, he coached football at North Carolina State University, where he compiled a 21–25–2 record. From 1934 to 1936, he coached football at the University of Virginia, where he compiled a 6–18–4 record. From 1930 to 1951, he served as the head men's basketball coach at Virginia, achieving his first championship in just his second year. During that tenure, he compiled a 240–190 record, including a NIT berth in 1941. His 240 wins rank fourth in school history. In 1951 he became athletic director. Tebell also coached baseball at Virginia from 1941 to 1942 and from 1944 to 1955, missing the 1943 season due to military service.

Tebell played football and basketball at the University of Wisconsin. As an end on the football team, he was selected a second-team All-American by the New York Times. After graduating, he played for the Columbus Tigers of the National Football League (NFL) in 1923 and 1924 and coached three of the team's games in 1923.

Tebell employed the “Meanwell System” on offense, named for its creator, Tebell's coach at Wisconsin. It featured a double-post alignment with constant cuts, pivots and short passes, and also pioneered the screen.

The University of Virginia honors Tebell by giving an annual award in his name, the Gus Tebell Memorial Award, which is granted each year to the graduating male student-athlete with the highest grade point average through his four years at the university.

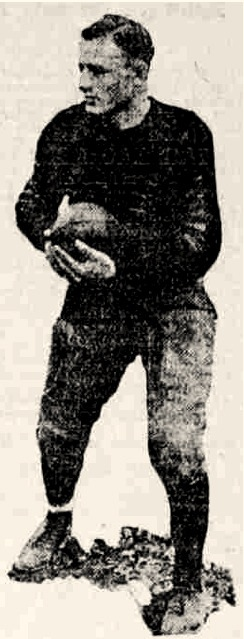
Tebell in 1922

== Head coaching record ==
=== NFL ===
Team	Year	Regular season					Postseason			
Team	Year	Won	Lost	Ties	Win %	Finish	Won	Lost	Win %	Result
Columbus Tigers	1923	2	0	1	.667	8th	-	-	-	-
Total		2	0	1	.667		0	0	.000	

=== College football ===
Year	Team	Overall	Conference	Standing
NC State Wolfpack (Southern Conference) (1925–1929)
1925	NC State	3–5–1	0–4–1	18th
1926	NC State	4–6	0–4	21st
1927	NC State	9–1	4–0	T–1st
1928	NC State	4–5–1	1–3–1	17th
1929	NC State	1–8	0–5	22nd
NC State:		21–25–2	5–16–2	
Virginia Cavaliers (Southern Conference) (1934–1935)
1934	Virginia	3–6	1–4	9th
1935	Virginia	1–5–4	0–3–2	T–8th
Virginia Cavaliers (Independent) (1936)
1936	Virginia	2–7		
Virginia:		6–18–4	1–7–2	
Total:		27–43–6		
