= John C. Heldt =

American football player and coach (1900–1985)

Biographical details
- Born: May 2, 1900; Elk River, Iowa, U.S.
- Died: May 6, 1985 (aged 85); Alameda, California, U.S.

Playing career
- 1918–1922: Iowa
- 1923: Columbus Tigers
- 1926: Columbus Tigers
- Positions: Center, guard

Coaching career (HC unless noted)
- 1923: Ohio
- 1924–1925: Waterloo East HS (IA)
- 1926: Columbus Tigers

Administrative career (AD unless noted)
- 1924–1926: Waterloo East HS (IA)

Head coaching record
- Overall: 3–5–1 (college); 1–6 (NFL)

John Claussen Heldt (May 2, 1900 – May 6, 1985) was an American football player and coach. After playing college football at the University of Iowa, in which he was a member of the 1921 All-Western college football team and 1922 All-Western college football team, he served as the head football coach at Ohio University in 1923. Heldt played professionally in the National Football League (NFL) for the Columbus Tigers in 1923 and was a player-coach with the Tigers in 1926.

== Early life and education ==
Heldt played on the Iowa Hawkeyes football team in 1922.

== Career ==
Heldt began his football coaching career with the Ohio Bobcats football team in 1923. He left Ohio for the National Football League and played with the Columbus Tigers in one game during 1923. Heldt returned to the Tigers in 1926 and played six additional games. During the 1926 National Football League season, Heldt was a player-coach for the Tigers and had one win alongside six losses.

== Personal life ==
During a 1951 accident, Heldt was pinned under a railway car and experienced a fracture to his hip and skull.

== Head coaching record ==
=== College ===
Year	Team	Overall	Conference	Standing	Bowl/playoffs
Ohio Green and White (Ohio Athletic Conference) (1923)
1923	Ohio	3–5–1	2–4–1	14th	
Ohio:		3–5–1	2–4–1		
Total:		3–5–1			
