= Earl Martineau =

American football player and coach (1896–1966)

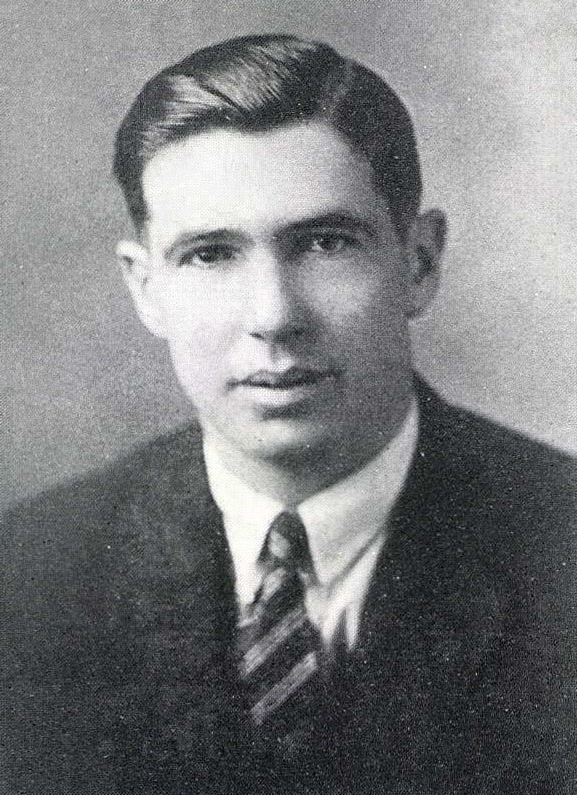

Biographical details
- Born: August 30, 1896; Minneapolis, Minnesota, U.S.
- Died: January 20, 1966 (aged 69); Menomonie, Wisconsin, U.S.

Playing career
- 1921–1923: Minnesota
- Position: Halfback

Coaching career (HC unless noted)
- 1924–1928: Western State Normal/Teachers
- 1929–1930: Purdue (backfield)
- 1932–1937: Princeton (backfield)
- 1938–1945: Michigan (assistant)

Head coaching record
- Overall: 27–10–1

Accomplishments and honors

Awards
- First-team All-American (1923); Second-team All-American (1922); 2× First-team All-Big Ten (1922, 1923)

Earl Thomas Martineau (August 30, 1896 – January 20, 1966) was an American college football player and coach. He played halfback at the University of Minnesota and was selected as an All-American in 1922 and 1923 and served as the captain of the 1923 Minnesota team. While at the University of Minnesota, Martineau was a member of Sigma Chi fraternity. After graduating from Minnesota, Martineau became a football coach. From 1924 to 1928, he was the head football coach at Western Michigan University, then known as Western State Normal School and Western State Teachers College, compiling a record of 27–10–1 in five seasons. His 1926 team tallied a record of 7–1. Martineau later served as a backfield coach for Purdue. In 1932, Martineau began a long association with Fritz Crisler. He was the backfield coach for Crisler at Princeton University from 1932 to 1937 and an assistant coach under Crisler at the University of Michigan from 1938 to 1945.

== Early life and playing career ==
Martineau attended West High School in Minneapolis, Minnesota, from which he graduated in 1917. He enlisted with the United States Marine Corps and served overseas from 1917 to 1919.

Martinau also competed in track and field for the University of Minnesota.

Earl Martineau died of a heart attack in 1966.

== Head coaching record ==
Year	Team	Overall	Conference	Standing	Bowl/playoffs
Western State Normal Hilltoppers (Independent) (1924–1926)
1924	Western State Normal	6–1			
1925	Western State Normal	6–2–1			
1926	Western State Normal	7–1			
Western State Teachers Hilltoppers (Michigan Collegiate Conference) (1927–1928)
1927	Western State Teachers	3–4	1–2	3rd	
1928	Western State Teachers	5–2	2–1	2nd	
Western State:		27–10–1	3–3		
Total:		27–10–1			
