= Max Kadesky =

American football player (1901–1970)

Profile
- Position: End

Personal information
- Born: February 8, 1901; Winsted, Connecticut, U.S.
- Died: August 14, 1970 (aged 69); Dubuque, Iowa, U.S.
- Listed height: 5 ft 11 in (1.80 m)
- Listed weight: 175 lb (79 kg)

Career information
- High school: Dubuque (IA)
- College: Iowa

Career history
- Rock Island Independents (1923)
- Stats at Pro Football Reference

Max R. Kadesky (February 8, 1901 – August 14, 1970) was an All-American college football player for the University of Iowa. He was a left end for Iowa's Big Ten championship football teams in 1921 and 1922. He later played one season in the National Football League (NFL) with the Rock Island Independents.

== Background ==
Max Kadesky was born in Connecticut but moved to Dubuque, Iowa, and attended Dubuque Senior High School. He played football, basketball, and baseball in high school, but his specialty was football. Kadesky was the team captain and coach of the football team in his senior season at Dubuque High School. He was inducted into his high school's Hall of Fame in 1997.

== College career ==
Kadesky went to the University of Iowa to play football for coach Howard Jones. In his first game as a sophomore in 1920, Kadesky caught the game-winning touchdown in a 14–7 victory over Indiana in Bloomington. Later that season, he blocked a Northwestern punt that was returned 35 yards for a touchdown in Iowa's 20–0 victory.

As a junior, Kadesky was a starter at left end for Iowa's undefeated 1921 football team. He was also an all-Big Ten selection that season. In his senior season in 1922, Kadesky helped lead Iowa to another Big Ten title and another undefeated season. He returned an interception 80 yards for a touchdown in a victory over Purdue that season, and at the end of the year, Kadesky was named a second-team All-American.

== Professional career ==
After graduation, Max Kadesky played eight games at left end for the Rock Island Independents of the NFL in 1923. He then retired from football and returned to Dubuque to begin a dental practice.
