= Football World =

- Editor: J. D. Fetzer
- Categories: Sports
- Frequency: Weekly
- Founded: 1921
- Country: United States

Football World, later renamed Athletic World, was an American magazine devoted to the coverage of inter-collegiate sports. Its masthead described it as "A Magazine With a Mission to Serve the College Man," a publication "devoted to Inter-collegiate Athletics and sports of Amateur standing only." It was founded in 1921 by J. D. Fetzer. The name of the magazine was later changed to Athletic World as the coverage extended to a broader range of sports, including women's swimming. Unlike other sports magazines of the era, which focused on promoting a healthy lifestyle, Football World/Athletic World celebrated the entertainment value of sports with a special emphasis on the personalities of famous athletes. The magazine was renamed Outing in December 1924, reflecting a change in its focus.
