= Irwin Uteritz =

American athlete and coach (1899–1963)

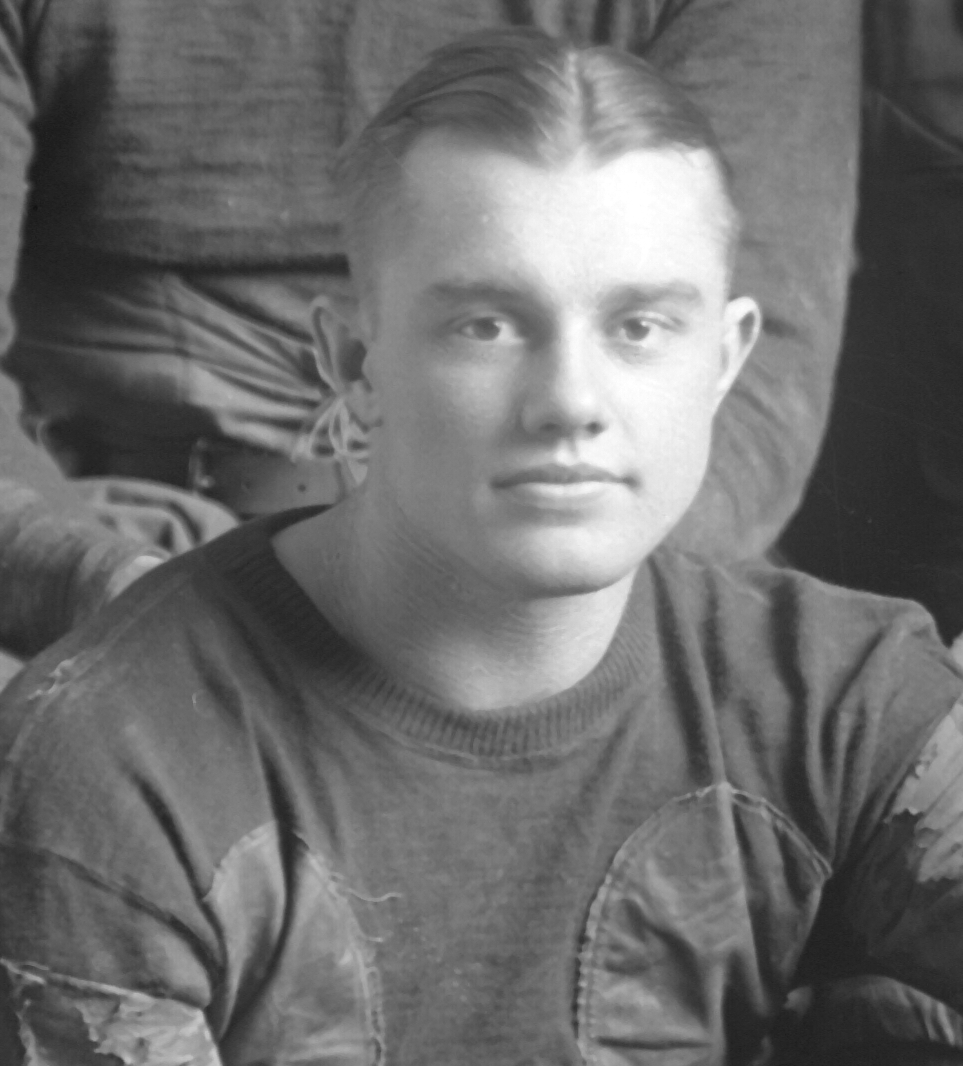

Biographical details
- Born: July 4, 1899; Oak Park, Illinois, U.S.
- Died: December 14, 1963 (aged 64); St. Louis, Missouri, U.S.

Playing career

Football
- 1921–1923: Michigan

Baseball
- 1922–1923: Michigan
- Positions: Quarterback (football); Second base, shortstop (baseball)

Coaching career (HC unless noted)

Football
- 1924: Northwestern (assistant)
- 1935–1946: California (backfield)
- 1947–1948: Washington University (backfield)
- 1949–1952: Washington University

Baseball
- 1933–1934: Wisconsin
- 1948: Washington University
- 1954–1963: Washington University

Head coaching record
- Overall: 18–18 (football); 162–66 (baseball; Wash U only)

Accomplishments and honors

Awards
- Football; Third-team All-American (1922)

Irwin Charles "Utz" Uteritz (July 4, 1899 – December 14, 1963) was an American athlete and coach. He played American football and baseball for the University of Michigan from 1921 to 1923. At 140 pounds, he was one of the lightest quarterbacks ever to start for a major college program. Despite his size, Michigan football coach Fielding H. Yost called him "the best field general I ever had."

Uteritz led Michigan to back-to-back undefeated seasons and a national championship in 1923. He also played three years of baseball for Michigan at second base and shortstop, hit above .300 and was elected as captain of the 1923 baseball team. Uteritz later served as a football and baseball coach at Northwestern University (1924–1925), the University of Wisconsin (1925–1935), the University of California (1935–1947), and Washington University in St. Louis (1947–1963).

== Playing career ==
=== Football ===
A native of Oak Park, Illinois, Uteritz was the quarterback for the Oak Park and River Forest High School football team coached by Glenn Thistlethwaite, who later became the head football coach at Northwestern. In 1920, Uteritz enrolled at the University of Michigan where he played quarterback from 1921 to 1923, leading the Wolverines to back-to-back undefeated football seasons in 1922 and 1923. Over the three years of his football career at Michigan, the Wolverines never lost a football game in which Uteritz played. Uteritz stood five feet seven inches and weighed only 140 pounds in 1922. He was "one of the lightest 'big time' quarterbacks in American football history when he played at Michigan from 1921 to 1923." Uteritz was known for his speed and his "heady" play as the Wolverines' field general. He was considered a "triple threat" player who had "about equal ability in kicking, forward passing and carrying the ball."

==== 1921 season ====
As a sophomore in 1921, Uteritz became Michigan's starting quarterback after Theodore Banks, who started the first four games at quarterback, was injured. Uteritz took over for the final three games of the year. His first game as a starter was a 3–0 win over Illinois in which Frank Steketee scored the only points on a field goal.

His second game as a starter was a 7–7 tie with Wisconsin. In addition to serving as quarterback, Uteritz was Michigan's punt returner, and a fluke play involving Uteritz resulted in Wisconsin's touchdown. Uteritz stood at Michigan's five-yard line waiting for a punt to cross the goal line. The ball apparently crossed the goal line, but bounded back. A Wisconsin player fell on the ball for the Badgers' only touchdown.

Uteritz fared better in the final game of the 1921 season, the annual Little Brown Jug game against Minnesota. On Michigan's opening drive, Uteritz took the ball on the Gopher 28-yard line on a delay pass play and "tore down the field to the one-yard line." On the next play, Uteritz plunged through for a touchdown to give Michigan the first points of the game. Near the end of the second quarter, Uteritz intercepted a pass at Michigan's 41-yard line and ran the ball back 59 yards going "through the entire team for a touchdown." Uteritz's two first-half touchdowns gave Michigan a 17–0 lead.

==== 1922 season ====
In Uteritz's junior year of 1922, the Wolverines were 6–0–1 and outscored opponents by a combined tally of 183 to 13. Uteritz started six of Michigan's seven games in 1922. He missed the opening game against Case as Michigan Coach Fielding H. Yost asked team captain Paul G. Goebel and Uteritz to accompany him to Columbus, Ohio to watch the Ohio State Buckeyes in action against Ohio Wesleyan. The scouting trip appears to have paid off as Uteritz led the Wolverines to 19–0 win over an Ohio State team that had been favored to win the Big Ten championship.

After the Ohio State game, nationally syndicated sports writer Billy Evans called Uteritz a "star" and wrote that he was handling the team "in a brainy fashion." And in November 1922, the Associated Press praised Uteritz's performance: "Uteritz, the Michigan quarterback, has shown to unusual advantage, his heady playing being responsible to a large degree for this year's victories." A Wisconsin newspaper called Uteritz "one of the headiest pilots in the Big Ten" and noted that he always knows who should carry the ball and "his judgment at all times is excellent."

After shutting out Illinois (24–0) and Michigan Agricultural (63–0), the Wolverines had a bye week before playing Wisconsin. Yost used the bye week for another scouting trip, traveling with Uteritz, Harry Kipke and Paul G. Goebel to Madison, Wisconsin to watch the Badgers play. A stenographer was hired to sit next to Yost in the press box to take down his notes of the game. The following week, Michigan defeated Wisconsin 13–6, and Uteritz completed a pass to Harry Kipke in the fourth quarter that proved to be the difference in the game. After catching Uteritz's pass, Kipke ran 35 yards for the winning touchdown.

At the end of the 1922 season, Uteritz was selected as a first-team All-American quarterback by syndicated sports writer, Frank G. Menke, and was a third-team selection by Walter Camp and Walter Eckersall. Uteritz was the first Michigan quarterback to be selected on Walter Camp's All-American football teams:

"Uteritz is the first Michigan signal-caller to be elected for any of Camp's mythical teams. Not that Michigan hasn't had some good quarterbacks ... but the palm goes to little Uteritz who in his two campaigns at Michigan has developed into a twinkler of the first degree."

In picking Uteritz as its second-team All-Western Conference quarterback, the Chicago Evening Journal wrote:

"There were many heady quarterbacks on this seasons squads. For ability to run his team, Uteritz of Michigan, perhaps stood out. He also handled punts well, but called for free catches oftener than he attempted to run with the ball. This is a fair indication of his good sense, for he is of such slight build that he could not survive being dumped time after time by ferocious ends."

Norman E. Brown, sports editor of the Central Press, picked Uteritz as his first-team All-Western quarterback in 1922, explaining his choice as follows: "Uteritz' handling of the Michigan team played an important part in its success. He is fast, a good passer, a sure tackler, a quick thinker."

==== 1923 season ====
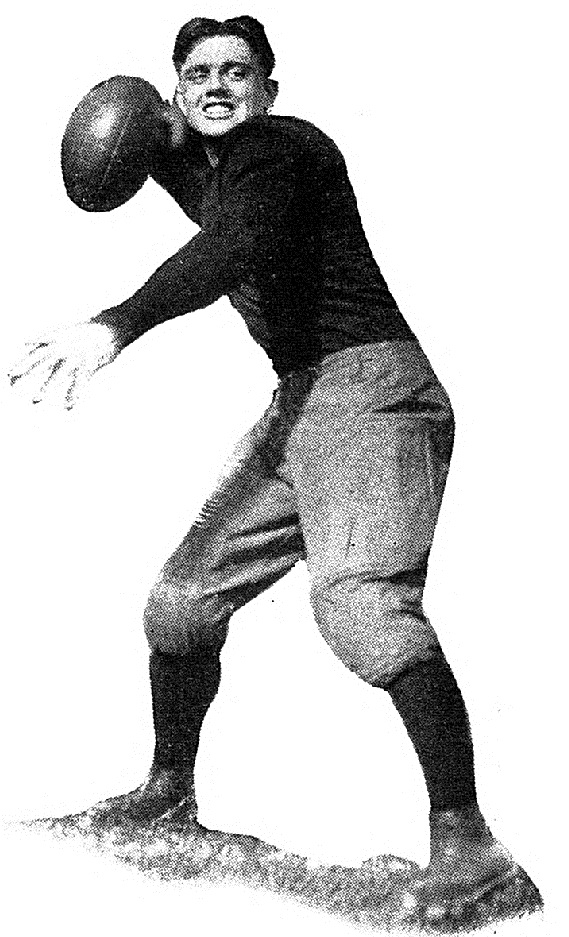
Uteritz tosses a pass.

As a senior in 1923, Uteritz led the Wolverines to an 8–0 record and outscored opponents 150–12. Michigan's first conference game in 1923 was against Ohio State in Ann Arbor. Fifty-thousand spectators watched Michigan shut out the Buckeyes 23–0. Michigan's first two touchdowns were scored on passes by Uteritz, a 16-yard pass to Herb Steger in the third quarter and a 60-yard completion to Harry Kipke in the fourth quarter.

Uteritz played his last game in a Michigan uniform against the Quantico Marines on November 10, 1923. Uteritz had one of his best games in a 26–6 win, but he also suffered a leg injury that ended his season. The Marines took a 6–0 lead in the first quarter of the game. Uteritz scored a touchdown in the second quarter, diving between center Jack Blott's legs to cross the goal-line. After tying the score with a touchdown, Uteritz then kicked for a successful extra point to give Michigan the winning points. Uteritz added his eighth point on an extra point kick in the third quarter. In the fourth quarter, Uteritz "limped perceptibly" after a hard tackle, but remained in the game until Michigan's trainer ordered him off the field. After the game, it was determined that Uteritz' leg had been broken, and he was unable to play in the last two games of the season. On learning that Uteritz would be unable to play in the remaining games, Coach Yost told reporters, "There goes half the football team. He was the best field general I ever had."

Despite missing the last two game of the season, Uteritz was selected as a second-team All-American by Lawrence Perry and a third-team selection by International News Service sports editor Davis Walsh.

=== Baseball ===
Uteritz also played three seasons on the University of Michigan baseball team. He was an infielder, playing at second base and shortstop. Uteritz was "rated as one of the best infielders of the Western Conference" and had a batting average above .300 in 1922. In June 1922, his teammates elected him team captain of the 1923 Michigan baseball team.

== Coaching career ==
"Utz" as the backfield coach of the California Golden Bears, December 1937.

After receiving his degree from Michigan, Uteritz spent the rest of his life working as a football and baseball coach. In 1924, he accepted a position as an assistant coach at Northwestern where his former high school coach Glenn Thistlewaite was then the head football coach. From 1925 to 1935, Uteritz held various positions at the University of Wisconsin, including assistant football coach, head baseball coach, and assistant athletic director. While coaching at Wisconsin, Uteritz also played baseball for the Madison Blues. From 1935 to 1946, he was the backfield coach at the University of California, Berkeley.

In 1947, Uteritz was hired as the backfield coach at Washington University in St. Louis. He became the head football coach for Washington University in 1949. Uteritz was head football coach at Washington for four years from 1949 to 1952 and coached his sons who played quarterback there during his tenure as head coach. The Washington University football team had a record of 18–18 in the four years that Uteritz was the head coach. Uteritz also served as the head baseball coach at Washington University for 11 seasons, in 1948 and from 1954 to 1963, compiling a record of 162–66.

Uteritz had long been known by the nickname "Utz." In 1952, he had his surname legally changed to Utz. He said he was tired of having his name "kicked around", and everyone called him Utz anyway. He died in St. Louis at age 63 of an apparent heart attack. He was survived by his wife, the former Genevieve Johnson, and four sons.

== Head coaching record ==
=== Football ===
Year	Team	Overall	Conference	Standing	Bowl/playoffs
Washington University Bears (Independent) (1949–1952)
1949	Washington University	7–2			
1950	Washington University	2–7			
1951	Washington University	5–4			
1952	Washington University	4–5			
Washington University:		18–18			
Total:		18–18			

== See also ==
- List of Michigan Wolverines football All-Americans
