= Norman E. Brown =

American sportswriter and editor

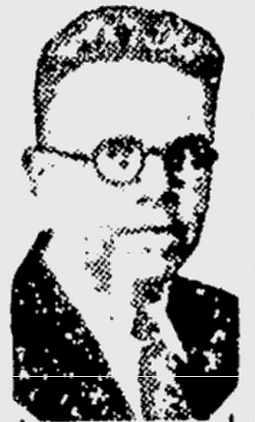
- Brown in 1929
- Born: Norman Edgar Brown; October 10, 1890; Ohio, U.S.
- Died: March 31, 1958 (aged 67); St. Petersburg, Florida, U.S.
- Occupation: Sportswriter

Norman Edgar Brown (October 10, 1890 – March 31, 1958) was an American sportswriter and sports editor for the Central Press Association.

== Biography ==
Brown was born in Ohio in October 1890. At the time of the 1910 United States census, Brown was living with his parents in Cleveland, Ohio, working as a newspaper reporter. By June 1917, he was the sporting editor of the Cleveland Press. At the time of the 1920 United States census, Brown was married, and he and his wife (Emily Anna Winter Brown) were living in Lakewood, Ohio, where Brown was the managing editor of a newspaper.

During the 1920s, Brown was the sports editor of the Central Press Association and wrote a regular sports column called "Fanning the Beehive" and "Sports Done Brown." He was also known for his annual college football All-American team selections. In 1926, he launched an effort to have the fans select the All-American team by taking a "country-wide poll of football followers."

At the time of the 1930 United States census, Brown was living in Lakewood, Ohio with his wife, and their daughter Emily Louise Brown; Brown remained employed at that time by the Central Press Association.

In addition to his work as a newspaper reporter and editor, Brown was active in politics. He was the campaign publicist for U.S. Supreme Court Justice Harold Hitz Burton when he ran for mayor of Cleveland in 1935. He served in the same capacity for John W. Bricker for Governor of Ohio in 1939.

In 1934, Brown moved to St. Petersburg, Florida. After moving to Florida, he became affiliated with the Derby Lane Greyhound Track, which he named. From 1942 to 1948, he was the manager of radio station WSUN in St. Petersburg. In his later years, he was the publicity director for the St. Petersburg Kennel Club. He died at his home in St. Petersburg in March 1958.

== Selected articles by Brown ==
- Four Teams In Big Leagues Mysteries; Chances Unknown, April 13, 1922
- Why There's a Smile on the Face of the Tiger (Princeton Tigers football), November 21, 1922
- Norman Brown Selects All-American Teams, December 10, 1922
- Will Two Unsung Rookies Crowd Two Heralded Stars from Stage (Willie Kamm, Rube Lutzke, Homer Ezzell, Norm McMillan), March 29, 1923
- Romero Is Heavy Comeback (Quintin Romero-Rojas), October 25, 1924
- What This Country Needs Most Is Some Way of Stopping the Ice Man of Illinois (Red Grange), November 7, 1924
- Temperament That Afflicted Yanks Missing In Nat Camp (1925 Washington Senators season), March 16, 1925
- It Will Be A Little Man: Who Stops Dempsey, Who Won Fame As A Giant Killer (Jack Dempsey), June 28, 1925
- Sam Rice Is A Big Cog With Champs (Sam Rice), July 14, 1925
- Makes Fans Think of Matty: So Greenfield Is Watched Closely By Giant Fans (Kent Greenfield), July 29, 1925
- Put on a New Record: Brookins Is Tired of Old Ones; Has Busted Most of Them (Charles Brookins), August 9, 1925
- They're Lookin' Mean: And Wanting Blood; Are Skipper Bill and His Mate (Bill McKechnie/Max Carey), September 3, 1925
- Hopeful Harvard: Banks on Fisher and His Grid Staff to Turn New Leaf (Bob Fisher, September 10, 1925
- Silver Threads Among (World Series) Gold (1925 World Series), October 1, 1925
- Brown Picked Capital Senators to Win Pennant; Now Favors Them in Series (1925 World Series), October 4, 1925
- Leading Hitters in Both Big Leagues Are Right Handers: Heilmann and Hornsby Star with the Bat (Harry Heilmann/Rogers Hornsby), October 19, 1925
- His Greatest Victory of Year: Was Over Joe Precedent and He Won by a Punch (Paul Berlenbach), December 20, 1925
- Jones Outlines Plan of Battle Against Hagen (Bobby Jones), February 24, 1926
- Kid Gleason Putting Pep in Athletics (Kid Gleason), March 30, 1926
- Expect Record Season (1926 in baseball), April 13, 1926
- Tony with the 'Toney': Coast Leaguer Steps Into Championship Class First Year (Tony Lazzeri), September 3, 1926
- Eddie Collins Given Raw Deal, But What's That to $20,000? (Eddie Collins), November 15, 1926
- Delaney Stops Gorman in Second (Jack Delaney), December 21, 1926
- Swords Points: 'Drakes' Hope to Make Duck Soup of Cage Rivals (Drake basketball), January 11, 1927
- Yanks Look To Ruth, Hurlers (1927 New York Yankees), March 27, 1927
- Hornsby vs. Landis (Rogers Hornsby/Kenesaw Mountain Landis), April 7, 1927
- Auto Speed Demons Ready To Start (1927 Indianapolis 500), May 29, 1927
- League Almost Busted by Ben (Ben Cantwell), May 1928
- Bob Martin, Victim of Ring Fate; Career Wrecked By Single Blow (Bob Martin), July 12, 1928
- Heeney? Tunney? Fizzle? (Gene Tunney v. Tom Heeney), July 20, 1928
- Urban Shocker Finally Passes From Big Time (Urban Shocker), August 5, 1928
- Michigan Has High Hopes for Big Ten Title (1928 Michigan Wolverines football team), October 28, 1928
- Cubs Rated Weak at Third, Behind Plate (1929 Chicago Cubs), September 6, 1929
- Not a Second Red Grange: But Just Himself, Trying To Play His Best Football (Frosty Peters)
