= 1921 Big Ten Conference football season =

- Sport: American football
- Number of teams: 10
- Champion: Iowa
- Runners-up: Chicago, Ohio State

Football seasons
- ← 1920 1922 →

1921 Big Ten Conference football standings
| | Conf. | | | | | Overall |
| Team | W | | L | | T | W | | L | | T |
|---|---|---|---|---|---|---|---|---|---|---|
| Iowa $ | 5 | – | 0 | – | 0 | 7 | – | 0 | – | 0 |
| Chicago | 4 | – | 1 | – | 0 | 6 | – | 1 | – | 0 |
| Ohio State | 4 | – | 1 | – | 0 | 5 | – | 2 | – | 0 |
| Wisconsin | 3 | – | 1 | – | 1 | 5 | – | 1 | – | 1 |
| Michigan | 2 | – | 1 | – | 1 | 5 | – | 1 | – | 1 |
| Indiana | 1 | – | 2 | – | 0 | 3 | – | 4 | – | 0 |
| Minnesota | 2 | – | 4 | – | 0 | 3 | – | 4 | – | 0 |
| Illinois | 1 | – | 4 | – | 0 | 3 | – | 4 | – | 0 |
| Purdue | 1 | – | 4 | – | 0 | 1 | – | 6 | – | 0 |
| Northwestern | 0 | – | 5 | – | 0 | 1 | – | 6 | – | 0 |
$ – Conference champion

The 1921 Big Ten Conference football season was the 26th season of college football played by the member schools of the Big Ten Conference (also known as the Western Conference) and was a part of the 1921 college football season.

The 1921 Iowa Hawkeyes football team, under head coach Howard Jones, compiled a 7–0 record and won the Big Ten championship. Quarterback Aubrey Devine and tackle Duke Slater received first-team All-American honors. Devine, Slater, fullback Gordon Locke, and end Lester Belding received first-team All-Big Ten honors. The team was retroactively selected as the 1921 national champion by the Billingsley Report and as a co-national champion by Parke H. Davis.

The 1921 Chicago Maroons football team, under head coach Amos Alonzo Stagg, compiled a 6–1 record, finished in a tie for second place in the Big Ten, and led the conference in scoring defense (1.9 points allowed per game). Notable players included end Fritz Crisler, quarterback Milton Romney, fullback John Webster Thomas, guard Charles Redmon, and tackle Charles McGuire.

The 1921 Michigan Wolverines football team, under head coach Fielding H. Yost compiled a 5–1–1 record, shut out five of seven opponents, and led the Big Ten in scoring offense (26.7 points per game). Center Ernie Vick was selected as a first-team All-American by Walter Camp, and end Paul G. Goebel was selected as a first-team All-American by sports writer Lawrence Perry. Guard Robert J. Dunne served as the team's captain and was selected as a first-team All-Big Ten Conference player. Harry Kipke and Doug Roby were the team's leading scorers.

== Season overview ==
=== Results and team statistics ===
| Conf. Rank | Team | Head coach | Overall record | Conf. record | PPG | PAG |
|---|---|---|---|---|---|---|
| 1 | Iowa | Howard Jones | 7–0 | 5–0 | 26.4 | 5.1 |
| 2 (tie) | Chicago | Amos Alonzo Stagg | 6–1 | 4–1 | 15.9 | **1.9** |
| 2 (tie) | Ohio State | John Wilce | 5–2 | 4–1 | 15.7 | 2.0 |
| 4 | Wisconsin | John R. Richards | 5–1–1 | 3–1–1 | 20.1 | **1.9** |
| 5 | Michigan | Fielding H. Yost | 5–1–1 | 2–1–1 | **26.7** | 3.0 |
| 6 | Indiana | Ewald O. Stiehm | 3–4 | 1–2 | 12.3 | 13.4 |
| 7 | Minnesota | Henry L. Williams | 3–4 | 2–4 | 8.6 | 20.1 |
| 8 (tie) | Illinois | Robert Zuppke | 3–4 | 1–4 | 12.6 | 7.3 |
| 8 (tie) | Purdue | William Henry Dietz | 1–6 | 1–4 | 1.3 | 13.6 |
| 10 | Northwestern | Elmer McDevitt | 1–6 | 0–5 | 4.9 | 17.1 |

Key
PPG = Average of points scored per game; team with highest average in bold
PAG = Average of points allowed per game; team with lowest average in bold

=== Regular season ===
==== September 24 ====
On September 24, 1921, two of the Big Ten teams opened their seasons with non-conference games, resulting in one victory and one defeat.

- Indiana 47, Franklin 0
- Beloit 7, Northwestern 0

==== October 1 ====
On October 1, 1921, the Big Ten teams participated in one conference game and seven non-conference games. The non-conference games resulted in six wins and one loss, giving the Big Ten a 7–2 non-conference record to that point in the season. Illinois had a bye week and did not open its season until the following week.

- Chicago 41, Northwestern 0
- Iowa 52, Knox 14
- Ohio State 28, Ohio Wesleyan 0
- Wisconsin 28, Lawrence 0
- Michigan 44, Mount Union 0
- Indiana 29, Kalamazoo 0
- Minnesota 19, North Dakota 0
- Wabash 9, Purdue 0

==== October 8 ====
On October 8, 1921, the Big Ten teams participated in two conference games and six non-conference games. The non-conference games resulted in four wins and two losses, giving the Big Ten an 11–4 non-conference record to that point in the season.

- Chicago 9, Purdue 0.
- Minnesota 28, Northwestern 0.
- Iowa 10, Notre Dame 7. Iowa defeated Notre Dame, 10-7, in Iowa City.
- Oberlin 7, Ohio State 6. Ohio State, which had won the Big Ten championship one year earlier, lost in a stunning upset to Oberlin, 7-6, at Ohio Stadium in Columbus, Ohio.
- Wisconsin 24, South Dakota State 3.
- Michigan 65, Case 0. Michigan defeated Case, 65–0, before a crowd of 8,000 at Ferry Field in Ann Arbor, Michigan. Michigan scored nine touchdowns and tallied 26 first downs in the game. Case was able to advance the ball past midfield only once, late in the game. Harry Kipke scored two touchdowns and was rated as the star of the game by the Detroit Free Press, with the newspaper noting that it "frequently took four struggling opponents to stop him in his smashing, dodging advances." Also, a Case snap from center went over the goal line resulting in a safety when Ernie Vick tackled a Case player.
- Harvard 19, Indiana 0.
- Illinois 52, South Dakota 0.

==== October 15 ====
On October 15, 1921, the Big Ten football teams played three conference games and two non-conference games. The non-conference games resulted in one win and one loss, giving the Big Ten a 12–5 non-conference record to that point in the season. Chicago and Indiana had bye weeks.

- Iowa 14, Illinois 2.
- Ohio State 27, Minnesota 0.
- Wisconsin 27, Northwestern 0.
- Michigan 30, Michigan Agricultural 0. In the annual Michigan–Michigan State football rivalry game, Michigan defeated Michigan Agricultural, 30–0, before a crowd of 18,000 at Ferry Field in Ann Arbor, Michigan. Michigan's Harry Kipke scored three touchdowns, including one on a punt return from midfield. Paul G. Goebel recovered two fumbles, blocked a punt which he then picked up and returned for a touchdown, "made 20 or so tackles," and kicked three extra points. Michigan's passing games was called "nothing short of miserable" as five of the Wolverines' passes were intercepted and only one was completed. Michigan's defense held the Aggies to 57 yards of total offense and two first downs (one of which was achieved by an offside penalty against Michigan).
- Notre Dame 33, Purdue 0.

==== October 22 ====
On October 22, 1921, the Big Ten football teams played three conference games and one non-conference game. The non-conference game resulted in a win, giving the Big Ten a 13–5 non-conference record to that point in the season. Iowa, Purdue, and Northwestern had bye weeks.

- Ohio State 14, Michigan 0. In the Michigan–Ohio State football rivalry game, Ohio State defeated Michigan, 14–0, at Ferry Field in Ann Arbor before a crowd of either 40,500 or 42,000 spectators — the largest crowd in Michigan history to that date. In the first quarter, Michigan halfback Harry Kipke had an open field run for a 35-yard gain, but he was injured on the play. Ohio State's first points came on a 30-yard punt return by Ohio State halfback Johnny Stuart. Stuart also had a 95-yard, wind-assisted punt in the game. Ohio State added a second touchdown in the fourth quarter on a run by the Ohio State fullback Taylor.
- Chicago 9, Princeton 0. Chicago defeated Princeton, 9-0, in Princeton, New Jersey. Princeton had been undefeated and recognized as co-national champion in 1920. Milton Romney kicked a field goal and caught a touchdown pass to account for all of the scoring. Chicago's victory was reported to be the first by a Midwestern team against one of "the so-called 'big three' of the east."
- Wisconsin 20, Illinois 0.
- Minnesota 6, Indiana 0.

==== October 29 ====
On October 29, 1921, the Big Ten football teams played three conference games and three non-conference games. The non-conference games resulted in two wins and one loss, giving the Big Ten a 15–6 non-conference record to that point in the season. Ohio State had a bye week.

- Iowa 13, Purdue 6.
- Michigan 3, Illinois 0. Michigan defeated the Illinois, 3 to 0, on a field that was "soaked from torrents of rain that fell all of the night before," with players skidding around the field and vision "obscured by clotted mud." Michigan's Frank Steketee kicked a field goal from placement for the game's only points.
- Wisconsin 35, Minnesota 0.
- Chicago 35, Colorado 0.
- Notre Dame 28, Indiana 7.
- Northwestern 34, DePaul 0.

==== November 5 ====
On November 5, 1921, the Big Ten football teams participated in three conference games and one non-conference game. The non-conference game resulted in a win, giving the Big Ten a 16–6 non-conference record during the 1921 season. Michigan, Wisconsin, and Indiana had bye weeks.

- Iowa 41, Minnesota 7
- Ohio State 7, Chicago 0
- Purdue 3, Northwestern 0
- Illinois 21, DePauw 0

==== November 12 ====
On November 12, 1921, the Big Ten football teams played four conference games. Minnesota and Northwestern had bye weeks.

- Iowa 41, Indiana 0.
- Ohio State 28, Purdue 0.
- Chicago 14, Illinois 6.
- Michigan 7, Wisconsin 7. Michigan and Wisconsin played to a 7–7 tie at Camp Randall Stadium in Madison, Wisconsin. The game was played on "a mud-ridden field that made footing almost impossible." Wisconsin's touchdown was scored when Michigan punted from behind the goal line and the kick went about 15 yards before bouncing back toward the Michigan goal where Gus Tebell "speared" the ball and dove across the goal line for a touchdown. Michigan scored on a "trick play" consisting of a "double forward pass." The play began with quarterback Irwin Uteritz tossing the ball to right end Paul G. Goebel. Goebel then threw a "fast, low pass" to an uncovered fullback Doug Roby. Roby caught the ball at the 20-yard line and ran from there across the goal line.

==== November 19 ====
On November 19, 1921, the Big Ten football teams concluded their seasons with five conference games.

- Iowa 14, Northwestern 0.
- Chicago 3, Wisconsin 0.
- Illinois 7, Ohio State 0.
- Michigan 38, Minnesota 0. In the annual battle for the Little Brown Jug, Michigan defeated Minnesota, 38–0, at Ferry Field in Ann Arbor before a crowd estimated at 33,000 spectators, first in drizzling rain and then in cold weather. Prior to the start of the game, a ceremony was held dedicating a bronze memorial tablet honoring four Michigan athletes (Curtis Redden, Otto Carpell, Efton James, and Howard R. Smith) who died in World War I. Michigan's quarterback Irwin Uteritz scored two touchdowns, including a 65-yard interception return that the Detroit Free Press called "the most thrilling achievement of the afternoon." Left end Clark Dean added a field goal from the 50-yard line that the Free Press called "the longest of the season, and, in most respects, the greatest any Michigan man ever exhibited to the gaze of paid spectators." Franklin Cappon scored on a 60-yard touchdown run, and Paul G. Goebel scored a touchdown on a 30-yard pass from Doug Roby that the Free Press called Michigan's "most spectacular pass" since 1907. Frank Steketee also scored a touchdown when he jumped on a Cappon fumble in the end zone. The game marked the worst defeat that a Minnesota football team had suffered to that point in the program's history, exceeding a 41–7 loss to Iowa earlier in the 1921 season.
- Indiana 3, Purdue 0

=== Bowl games ===
No Big Ten teams participated in any bowl games during the 1921 season.

== Awards and honors ==
=== All-Big Ten players ===
The following players were selected as first-team players on the 1921 All-Big Ten Conference football team by Billy Evans (BE), Walter Eckersall (WE), or Luther A. Huston of the International News Service (LH). It also includes players listed as members of the 1921 "All-Conference Team" as published in the "ESPN Big Ten Football Encyclopedia" (BTFE).

| Position | Name | Team | Selectors |
|---|---|---|---|
| Quarterback | Aubrey Devine | Iowa | BTFE, BE, WE, LH |
| Halfback | Alvah Elliott | Wisconsin | BTFE, BE, WE, LH |
| Halfback | Roland Williams | Wisconsin | BE |
| Halfback | Don Peden | Illinois | BTFE, WE |
| Halfback | Laurie Walquist | Illinois | LH |
| Fullback | Gordon Locke | Iowa | BTFE, BE, WE, LH |
| End | Fritz Crisler | Chicago | BTFE, BE, WE, LH |
| End | Stevens Gould | Wisconsin | WE, LH |
| End | Truck Myers | Ohio State | BTFE, WE, LH |
| End | Lester Belding | Iowa | BE |
| Tackle | Charles McGuire | Chicago | BTFE, BE, WE, LH |
| Tackle | Duke Slater | Iowa | BTFE, BE, WE, LH |
| Guard | Robert J. Dunne | Michigan | BTFE, WE, LH |
| Guard | Lloyd Pixley | Ohio State | BE, LH |
| Guard | Dean W. Trott | Ohio State | BTFE, BE, WE |
| Center | Ernie Vick | Michigan | BTFE, WE |
| Center | George C. Bunge | Wisconsin | BE, LH |

=== All-Americans ===
Two Big Ten players were selected as consensus first-team players on the 1921 College Football All-America Team. They were:

| Position | Name | Team | Selectors |
|---|---|---|---|
| Quarterback | Aubrey Devine | Iowa | WC, BE, FW, JV, LP, MM, WE |
| Tackle | Iolas Huffman | Ohio State | FW, LP |

Other Big Ten players received first-team honors from at least one selector. They were:

| Position | Name | Team | Selectors |
|---|---|---|---|
| Tackle | Duke Slater | Iowa | BE, WE, JV |
| Tackle | Charles McGuire | Chicago | WC, MM |
| Guard | Dean Trott | Ohio State | LP, JV |
| Guard | Robert J. Dunne | Michigan | NB |
| Guard | Lloyd Pixley | Ohio State | NB |
| Center | Ernie Vick | Michigan | WC |
| End | Fritz Crisler | Chicago | WE |
| End | Paul G. Goebel | Michigan | LP |
