= 1921 Michigan Wolverines football team =

American college football season

1921 Michigan Wolverines football
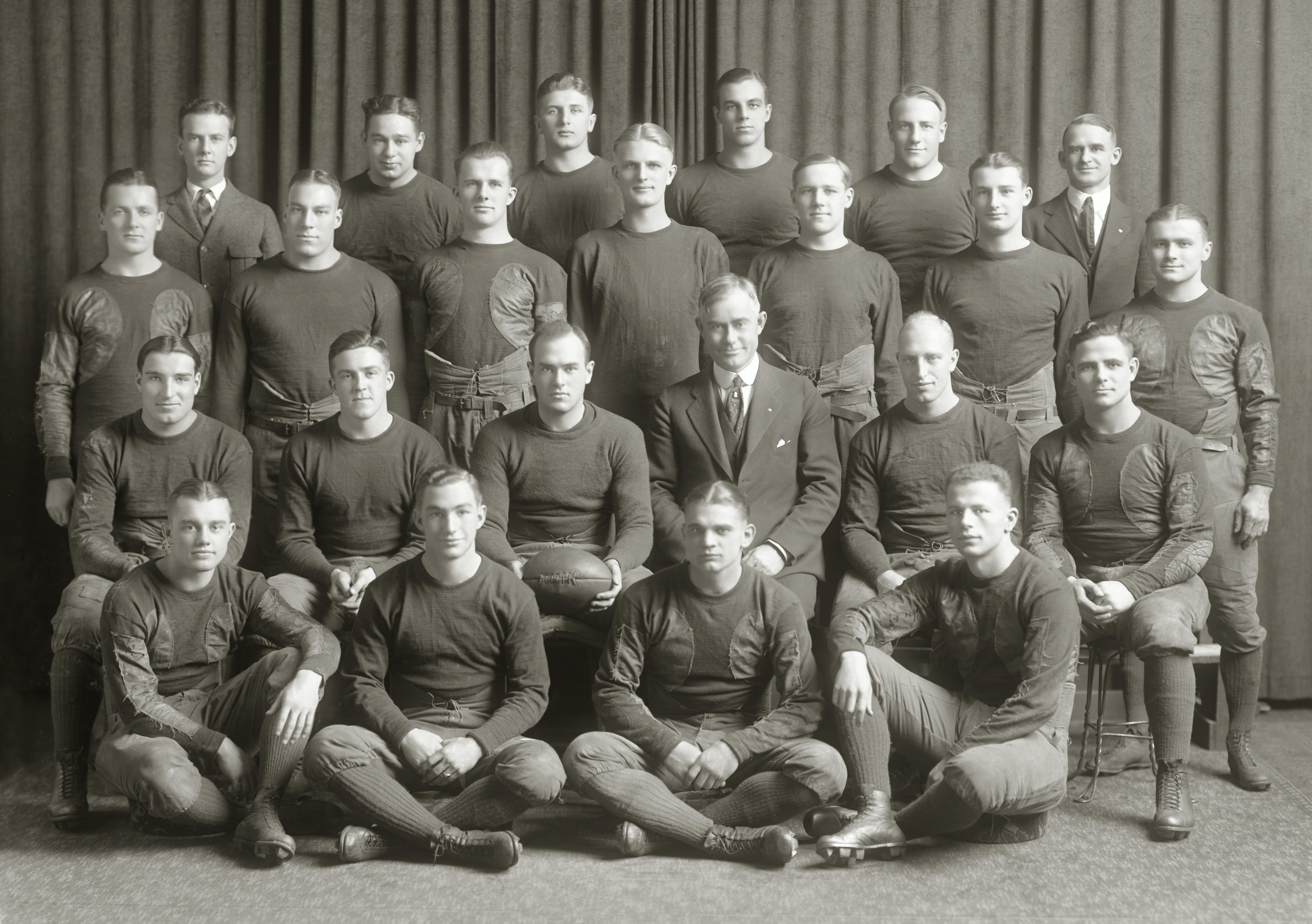
- Conference: Big Ten Conference
- Record: 5–1–1 (2–1–1 Big Ten)
- Head coach: Fielding H. Yost (21st season)
- Captain: Robert J. Dunne
- Home stadium: Ferry Field

Uniform
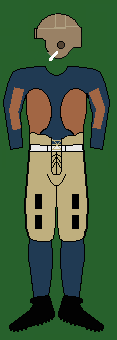

1921 Big Ten Conference football standings
	Conf.					Overall
Team	W		L		T	W		L		T
Iowa $	5	–	0	–	0	7	–	0	–	0
Chicago	4	–	1	–	0	6	–	1	–	0
Ohio State	4	–	1	–	0	5	–	2	–	0
Wisconsin	3	–	1	–	1	5	–	1	–	1
Michigan	2	–	1	–	1	5	–	1	–	1
Indiana	1	–	2	–	0	3	–	4	–	0
Minnesota	2	–	4	–	0	3	–	4	–	0
Illinois	1	–	4	–	0	3	–	4	–	0
Purdue	1	–	4	–	0	1	–	6	–	0
Northwestern	0	–	5	–	0	1	–	6	–	0
$ – Conference champion

The 1921 Michigan Wolverines football team represented the University of Michigan in the 1921 Big Ten Conference football season. In his 21st year as head coach, Fielding H. Yost led Michigan to a 5–1–1 record, as the Wolverines outscored their opponents with a combined score of 187 to 21. Michigan recorded shutouts in five of its seven games, allowing only 14 points in a loss to Ohio State and 7 points in a tie with Wisconsin. Over the course of five home games at the newly expanded Ferry Field, the Wolverines attracted crowds totaling 143,500 with receipts totaling $170,000.

Injuries to multiple Michigan backfield starters, including quarterback Ted Bank, fullback Frank Steketee, and Eddie Usher and Harry Kipke, required repeated changes in the team's lineup, including the conversion of Franklin Cappon from a tackle to a halfback. Starting center Ernie Vick was selected as a first-team All-American by Walter Camp, and end Paul G. Goebel was selected as a first-team All-American by sports writer Lawrence Perry. Left guard Robert J. Dunne served as the team's captain and was selected as a first-team All-Big Ten Conference player. The team's leading scorers were halfback Harry Kipke and fullback Doug Roby, each of whom scored five touchdowns for 30 points.

== Schedule ==
Date	Time	Opponent	Site	Result	Attendance
October 1		Mount Union*	Ferry Field; Ann Arbor, MI	W 44–0	10,000
October 8		Case*	Ferry Field; Ann Arbor, MI	W 65–0	8,000
October 15		Michigan Agricultural*	Ferry Field; Ann Arbor, MI (rivalry)	W 30–0	18,000
October 22		Ohio State^{†}	Ferry Field; Ann Arbor, MI (rivalry)	L 0–14	40,500
October 29		at Illinois	Illinois Field; Champaign, IL (rivalry)	W 3–0	14,000
November 12	2:00 p.m.	at Wisconsin	Camp Randall Stadium; Madison, WI	T 7–7	20,000
November 19	2:00 p.m.	Minnesota	Ferry Field; Ann Arbor, MI (Little Brown Jug)	W 38–0	33,000
*Non-conference game; ^{†}Homecoming; All times are in Eastern time

== Preseason ==
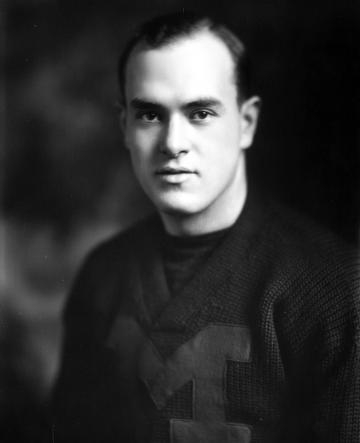
1921 team captain Duke Dunne

Since 1906, the Michigan Wolverines football team had played its home games at Ferry Field. Prior to the start of the 1921 season, the seating capacity at Ferry Field was expanded to 42,000 with the construction of new stands at the west end of the field. The expansion resulted in Ferry Field becoming the country's third largest stadium.

As the season got underway, Fielding Yost, who had served as head coach since 1901, expressed uncertainty about his team's prospects. With both of the tackles from the 1920 team (Tad Wieman and Angus Goetz) having graduated and joined the coaching staff, Yost noted that the team would have to develop new talent. He had hoped that Wieman's brother, Don Wieman, and LeRoy Niesch, both sophomores, would become the team's starters at tackle, but both were injured in practice. Accordingly, Franklin Cappon and Stanley Muirhead were tasked with moving to the tackle positions. Yost noted that his team was light, with no player weighing more than 185 pounds, "but it will be a fast, fighting, aggressive eleven."

During practice in the fall of 1921, 300 students were outfitted with football uniforms, 50 first-string players, 20 "scrubs", and 200 freshmen.

== Season summary ==
=== Week 1: Mount Union ===
Week 1: Mount Union at Michigan

Team	1	2	3	4	Total
Mount Union	0	0	0	0	0
• Michigan	14	14	6	10	44

- Date: October 1, 1921
- Location: Ferry Field
  Ann Arbor, MI
- Game attendance: 12,000
- Referee: Harvey Snyder (Harvard)

On October 1, 1921, Michigan opened its season with a 44–0 victory over Mount Union from Alliance, Ohio. The game was played at Ferry Field with a crowd of 10,000 persons in attendance.

Frank Steketee returned the opening kickoff 60 yards to the Mount Union 15-yard line. Eddie Usher scored Michigan's first touchdown and Steketee kicked for the extra point. Michigan's second touchdown followed after Stanley Muirhead blocked a punt and Paul G. Goebel recovered the loose ball on the Mount Union one-yard line. Usher then carried the ball for the touchdown. Before the first quarter was over, head coach Yost replaced Dunne, Kirk and Usher with substitutes. Steketee scored Michigan's third touchdown from punt formation on a 38-yard run around the left end and then kicked the extra point. Doug Roby scored Michigan's fourth touchdown on a four-yard run, also in the second quarter, and Steketee again kicked for the extra point.

At halftime, Yost replaced six more starters with substitutes. Michigan's fifth touchdown followed a 60-yard punt return by Irwin Uteritz to the Mount Union 10-yard line, with Roby running for the touchdown and Uteritz missing the kick for point after touchdown. In the fourth quarter, Michigan scored on a free attempt at goal following a fair catch by Uteritz. Clark Dean converted the free attempt by kicking a field goal from placement from Mount Union's 41-yard line. Dean then scored again for Michigan's sixth and final touchdown on a 15-yard gain and successfully kicked the extra point. Another Michigan touchdown in the fourth quarter (a 25-yard run by Jack Searle) was disallowed due to a holding penalty. Mount Union was held to a single first down through its offensive efforts with another four first downs resulting from Michigan penalties. Michigan attempted five passes in the game, but completed none.

The game was played in four quarters of 15, 10, 15, and 10 minutes. Out of 38 players, 31 saw action against Mount Union. Michigan's starting lineup against Case was Bernard Kirk (left end), Franklin Cappon (left tackle), Robert J. Dunne (left guard), Ernie Vick (center), Hugh Wilson (right guard), Muirhead (right tackle), Goebel (right end), Ted Bank (quarterback), Usher (left halfback), Harry Kipke (right halfback), and Steketee (fullback). Substitutes included Roby, Donald Swan, Verne Richards, Stephen Garfield, Walter Kreinheder, Louis Curran, James Johns, Uteritz, Paper, John Fairbairn, Charles Petro, John Landowski, J. W. McAuliffe, C. J. Smith, John Searle, Clark Dean, Ray Knode, Bill Van Orden, and Martin.

=== Week 2: Case ===
Week 2: Case at Michigan

Team	1	2	3	4	Total
Case	0	0	0	0	0
• Michigan	9	28	6	21	64

- Date: October 8, 1921
- Location: Ferry Field
  Ann Arbor, MI
- Game attendance: 8,000
- Referee: Walter S. Kennedy

In the second week of the 1921 season, Michigan defeated the Case team from Cleveland by a score of 65 to 0. The game was played at Ferry Field in Ann Arbor before a crowd of 8,000 persons.

Michigan scored nine touchdowns and tallied 26 first downs in the game. Case was able to advance the ball past midfield only once, late in the game. Harry Kipke scored two touchdowns and was rated as the star of the game by the Detroit Free Press, with the newspaper noting that it "frequently took four struggling opponents to stop him in his smashing, dodging advances."

In addition to Kipke's touchdowns, Michigan also scored on two touchdowns each by Doug Roby and single touchdowns by Frank Steketee, Eddie Usher, John Searle, Ted Bank and Ray Knode, and on extra points by Steketee (3), Paul G. Goebel (3), and Knode (2). Also in the first quarter, a Case snap from center went over the goal line resulting in a safety when Ernie Vick tackled a Case player, giving Michigan a 9–0 lead at the end of the first quarter.

The game consisted of four 11-minute periods. Michigan's starting lineup against Mount Union was Bernard Kirk (left end), Franklin Cappon (left tackle), Robert J. Dunne (left guard), Vick (center), Hugh Wilson (right guard), Stanley Muirhead (right tackle), Goebel (right end), Bank (quarterback), Kipke (left halfback), Steketee (right halfback), and Usher (fullback). Substitutes included Irwin Uteritz, Bill Van Orden, Searle, Louis Curran, Donald Swan, Charles Petro, Roby, Ray Knode, Walter Kreinheder, C. J. Smith, Verne Richards, William Crawforth, Herbert Dunphy, John Henry, and J. W. McAuliffe.

=== Week 3: Michigan Agricultural ===
Week 3: Michigan Agricultural at Michigan

Team	1	2	3	4	Total
Michigan Agricultural	0	0	0	0	0
• Michigan	7	0	14	9	30

- Date: October 15, 1921
- Location: Ferry Field
  Ann Arbor, MI
- Referee: Horatio B. Hackett

In the third week of the season, the Wolverines registered their third consecutive shutout with a 30–0 victory over Michigan Agricultural College. The game was played at Ferry Field before a crowd of 18,000 spectators.

Michigan's stars in the game were left halfback Harry Kipke and right end Paul G. Goebel. Kipke scored three touchdowns, including one on a punt return from midfield, and kicked nine punts for an average of better than 42 yards. Goebel recovered two fumbles, blocked a punt which he then picked up and returned for a touchdown, "made 20 or so tackles," and kicked three extra points. Ray Knode kicked a field goal. Michigan's passing games was called "nothing short of miserable" as five of the Wolverines' passes were intercepted and only one was completed. Michigan's defense held the Aggies to 57 yards of total offense and two first downs (one of which was achieved by an offside penalty against Michigan).

The game was played in 15-minute quarters at Ferry Field in Ann Arbor. The Wolverines played the entire game without Frank Steketee, and quarterback Ted Bank and fullback Eddie Usher were both injured in the game.

=== Week 4: Ohio State ===
Week 4: Ohio State at Michigan

Team	1	2	3	4	Total
• Ohio State	0	7	0	7	14
Michigan	0	0	0	0	0

- Date: October 22, 1921
- Location: Ferry Field
  Ann Arbor, MI

In the fourth game of the season, Michigan played without two of its backfield stars, Ted Bank and Eddie Usher, both of whom were injured in the M.A.C. game. The Wolverines lost to Ohio State by a 14 to 0 score at Ferry Field in Ann Arbor. The game was played to a crowd of either 40,500 or 42,000 spectators—the largest crowd in Michigan history to that date. Before the game began, Ohio Governor Harry L. Davis led the Ohio State band up and down the field in what the Detroit Free Press called as "pretty a picture as has ever been painted." The Ohio State bulldog also "pranced" on the field wearing a scarlet sweater.

In the first quarter, left halfback Harry Kipke had an open field run for a 35-yard gain, but he was injured on the playing, leaving the Wolverines without three of their four starting backfield players. Ohio State's first points came in the second quarter on a short punt by Frank Steketee that Ohio State's left halfback Johnny Stuart caught at Michigan's 30-yard line and, with the agility of a cat," returned for a touchdown. Stuart also had a 95-yard, wind-assisted punt in the game. Ohio State added a second touchdown in the fourth quarter on a run by the Ohio State fullback Taylor.

The game was played in 15-minute quarters. Michigan's starting lineup against Ohio State was Kirk (left end), Cappon (left tackle), Dunne (left guard), Vick (center), Johns (right guard), Muirhead (right tackle), Goebel (right end), Uteritz (quarterback), Kipke (left halfback), Roby (right halfback), and Steketee (fullback). Substitutes included Knode, Fairbairn, Van Orden, Curran, Searles, and Smith.

=== Week 5: at Illinois ===
Week 5: Michigan at Illinois

Team	1	2	3	4	Total
• Michigan	0	3	0	0	3
Illinois	0	0	0	0	0

- Date: October 29, 1921
- Location: Illinois Field
  Champaign, IL
- Referee: Walter Eckersall

Michigan traveled to Champaign, Illinois, for its first road game on October 29, 1921. A special train with 11 Pullmans left Ann Arbor on Friday evening with 600 students and the varsity band. Upon arriving in Champaign on Saturday morning, the Michigan contingent walked to the Inman Hotel where the Michigan team was quartered. Michigan students raided the hotel dining room and woke the guests with a variety of cheers and songs, including "Varsity" and "Samuel Hall".

The Wolverines defeated the Illini 3 to 0 on a field that was "soaked from torrents of rain that fell all of the night before," with players skidding around the field and vision "obscured by clotted mud." Michigan entered the game hobbled by injuries, with three of the team's backfield starters, Harry Kipke, Eddie Usher, and Ted Bank, all being unable to play.

The lone scoring drive of the game came in the second period and was led by the rushing efforts of left halfback Franklin Cappon and fullback Doug Roby, which advanced the ball to the Illinois six-yard line. From there, right halfback Frank Steketee kicked a field goal from placement to give the Wolverines a 3 to 0 lead. Late in the game, Michigan maintained another long drive, and time was called with the ball at the Illinois 15-yard line. The Detroit Free Press praised the efforts of Cappon, who was moved from tackle to halfback for the game after injuries to multiple backfield players.

After the game, the Michigan varsity band put their caps on backwards and led the Michigan students in a snake-dance through the streets of Champaign. On arriving at the Inman Hotel, varsity cheerleader Al Cuthbert climbed atop the hotel's glass awning to lead the Michigan contingent in cheers, breaking the awning in the process.

Michigan's starting lineup against Illinois was Bernard Kirk (left end), James Johns (left tackle), Dunne (left guard), Ernie Vick (center), Hugh Wilson (right guard), Stanley Muirhead (right tackle), Paul G. Goebel (right end), Irwin Uteritz (quarterback), Cappon (left halfback), Frank Steketee (right halfback), and Roby (fullback). Michigan played the entire game with only one substitution, Donald Swan entering the game at right guard in the fourth quarter.

=== Week 6: at Wisconsin ===
Week 6: Michigan at Wisconsin

Team	1	2	3	4	Total
Michigan	0	7	0	0	7
Wisconsin	0	7	0	0	7

- Date: November 12, 1921
- Location: Camp Randall Stadium
  Madison, WI
- Game start: 2:00 p.m.
- Game attendance: 20,000
- Referee: Walter Eckersall

On November 12, 1921, and with two weeks to prepare, the Wolverines played the undefeated Wisconsin Badgers to a 7–7 tie at Camp Randall Stadium in Madison, Wisconsin. The game was played on "a mud-ridden field that made footing almost impossible." Two-thousand Michigan students and alumni traveled to the game on a special train that left Ann Arbor on Friday night and arrived in Madison "looking like tramps" on Saturday morning at 10 a.m. Michigan's varsity band, consisting of some 60 pieces, also traveled on the special train and led a parade around the Wisconsin State Capitol building "followed by students and Michigan cars"

Wisconsin's touchdown followed after a punt by the Badger fullback Sundt appeared to be headed for a touchback in the endzone, but fell dead in the mud less six inches from Michigan's goal line. Michigan's right halfback, Frank Steketee, was required to punt from behind his goal line. With the Badgers breaking through on the play, Steketee hurried his kick which went straight up in the air, advancing no more than 15 yards before rolling back toward the Michigan goal. Wisconsin's right end Gus Tebell "speared" the ball and dove across the goal line for a touchdown.

Michigan responded with its own second-quarter touchdown to tie the score. With the ball near midfield, Michigan executed a "trick play" consisting of a "double forward pass." The play began with quarterback Irwin Uteritz tossing the ball to right end Paul G. Goebel. Goebel then threw a "fast, low pass" to an uncovered fullback Doug Roby. Roby caught the ball at the 20-yard line and ran from there across the goal line. Goebel also kicked the extra point. Michigan's touchdown was the first (and only) touchdown scored against the 1921 Wisconsin football team. Kipke missed a dropkick for field goal in the third quarter. Later, with the ball at Wisconsin's 20-yard line, Clark Dean attempted a field goal from placement, but the left side of the line was left unguarded, and Wisconsin right tackle Brumm was able to partially block the kick.

Wisconsin completed 10 of 20 passes in the game for 102 yards, while Michigan completed only one of four passes, the lone completion coming on Goebel's 45-yard touchdown pass to Roby. Michigan ran the ball 45 times for 103 yards while Wisconsin rushed 42 times for 82 yards. Michigan center Ernie Vick was credited with repeatedly breaking through the line and holding Wisconsin to a loss of yardage. Michigan quarterback Irwin Uteritz was also credited with his best game of the season, intercepting "numerous passes," recovering a fumble, and making several "neat returns of punts."

The game was played in 15-minute quarters. Michigan's starting lineup against Wisconsin was Kirk (left end), James Johns (left tackle), Dunne (left guard), Ernie Vick (center), Hugh Wilson (right guard), Stanley Muirhead (right tackle), Paul G. Goebel (right end), Irwin Uteritz (quarterback), Franklin Cappon (left halfback), Steketee (right halfback), and Doug Roby (fullback). Substitutes were Harry Kipke, Eddie Usher, Clark Dean, Searles, Petro, LeRoy Neisch, and Louis Curran. Michigan's captain Dunne left the game late in the second quarter with an injury to his arm or shoulder. Michigan's ends Goebel and Bernard Kirk also left the game with injuries in the second half.

=== Week 7: Minnesota ===
Week 7: Minnesota at Michigan

Team	1	2	3	4	Total
Minnesota	0	0	0	0	0
• Michigan	10	7	7	14	38

- Date: November 19, 1921
- Location: Ferry Field
  Ann Arbor, MI
- Game start: 2:00 p.m.
- Game attendance: 30,000
- Referee: Horatio B. Hackett

In the final game of the 1921 season, Michigan defeated the Minnesota Golden Gophers by a 38–0 score. The game was played at Ferry Field in Ann Arbor before a crowd estimated at 33,000 spectators, first in drizzling rain and then in cold weather. Prior to the start of the game, a ceremony was held dedicating a bronze memorial tablet honoring four Michigan athletes (Curtis Redden, Otto Carpell, Efton James, and Howard R. Smith) who died in World War I.

Michigan's quarterback Irwin Uteritz scored two touchdowns, including a 65-yard interception return that the Detroit Free Press called "the most thrilling achievement of the afternoon." Left end Clark Dean added a field goal from the 50-yard line that the Free Press called "the longest of the season, and, in most respects, the greatest any Michigan man ever exhibited to the gaze of paid spectators." Franklin Cappon scored on a 60-yard touchdown run, and Paul G. Goebel kicked all five extra points and, unguarded late in the game, scored a touchdown on a 30-yard pass from Doug Roby that the Free Press called Michigan's "most spectacular pass" since 1907. Frank Steketee also scored a touchdown when he jumped on a Cappon fumble in the end zone. The game marked the worst defeat that a Minnesota football team had suffered to that point in the program's history, exceeding a 41–7 loss to Iowa earlier in the 1921 season.

The Free Press noted that the Wolverines' team execution against Minnesota recommended vindication for coach Yost: "To his disparagers who claim he cannot cope with the younger school of coaches in the employment of the mysteries of the modern game, Yost gave the laugh, a long, resonant burst of the so-called raspberry."

Michigan's starting lineup against Minnesota was Dean (left end), James Johns (left tackle), Charles Petro (left guard), Ernie Vick (center), Hugh Wilson (right guard), Stanley Muirhead (right tackle), Goebel (right end), Uteritz (quarterback), Cappon (left halfback), Harry Kipke (right halfback), and Roby (fullback). Substitutes included Steketee, Ted Bank, Ray Knode, Don Weiman, C. J. Smith, Louis Curran, John Searle, LeRoy Neisch and William Van Orden.

== Players ==
=== Depth chart ===
Offense

LE
Bernard Kirk
Walter Clark Dean
LeRoy Neisch

LT	LG	C	RG	RT
Franklin Cappon	Robert J. Dunne	Ernie Vick	Hugh E. Wilson	Stanley Muirhead
James Edward Johns	Charles C. Petro	Edliff Slaughter	Donald Swan	Ed Vandervoot
	Bill Van Ordan			

RE
Paul G. Goebel
Louis B. Curran

QB
Ted Bank
Irwin Uteritz
Ray Knode

LHB	RHB
Harry Kipke	Eddie Usher
John G. Searle	Franklin Cappon

FB
Doug Roby
Frank Steketee

=== Varsity letter winners ===
Michigan's 1921 scoring leaders with five touchdowns each

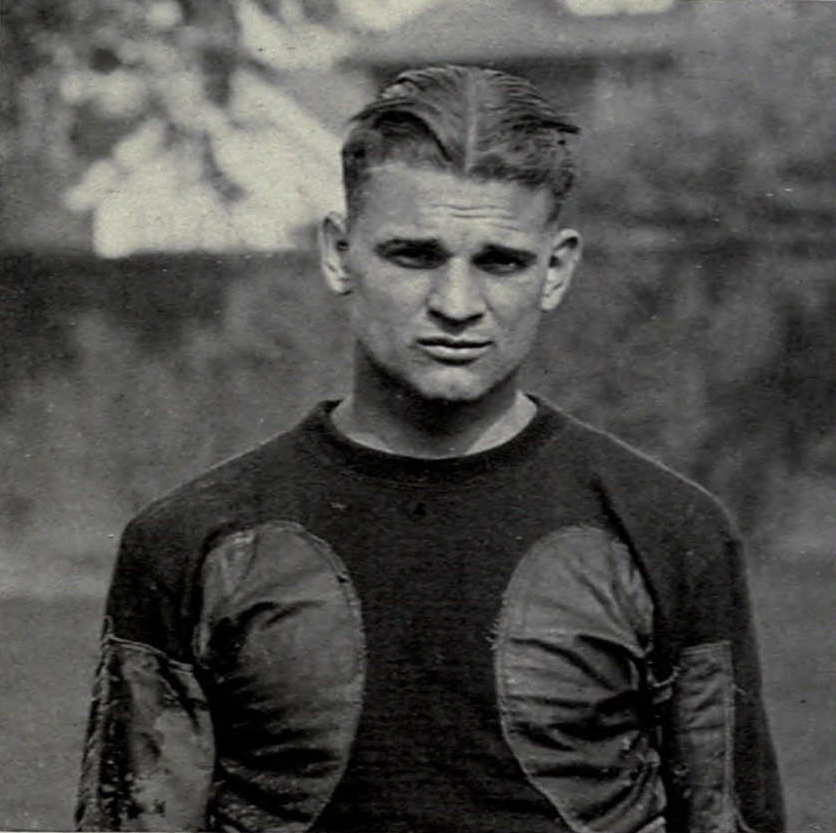
Halfback Harry Kipke

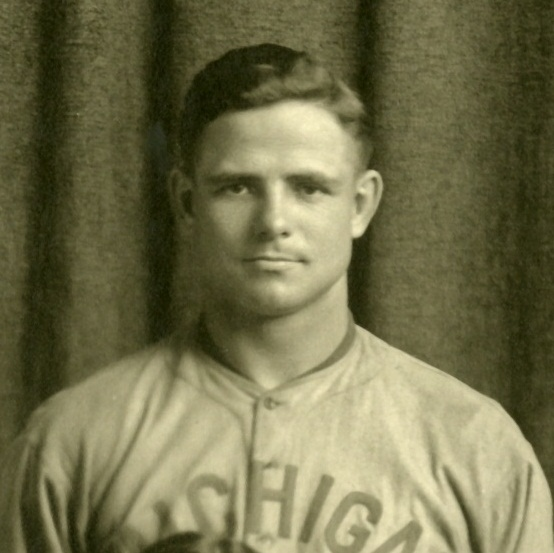
Fullback Doug Roby

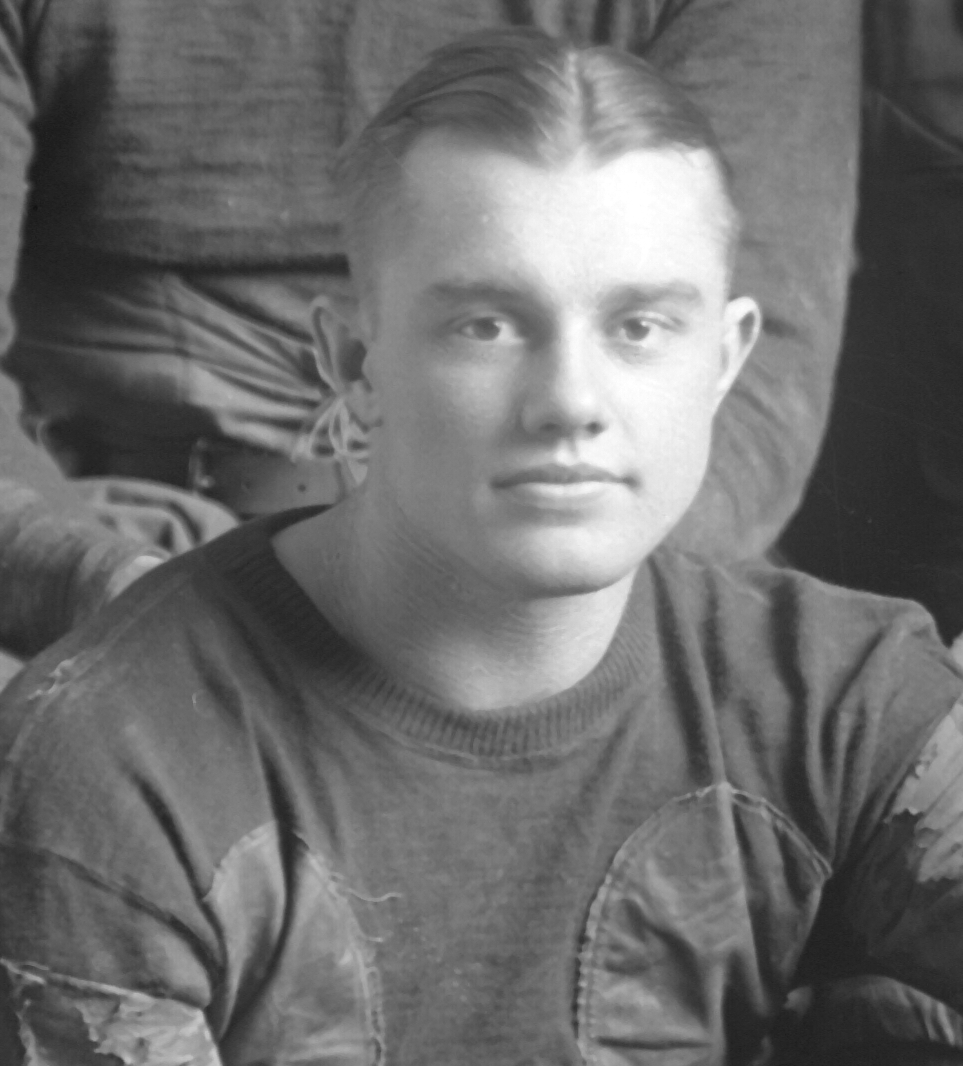
Quarterback Irwin Uteritz

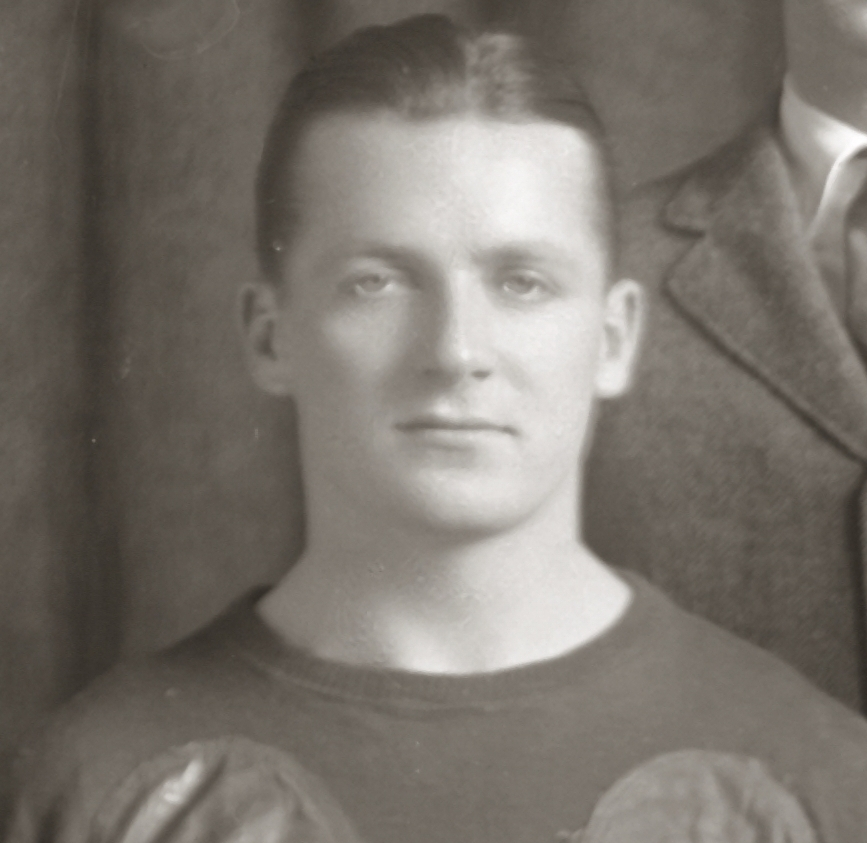
Fullback Frank Steketee

For their contributions to the 1921 Michigan football team, the following 22 players received varsity letters:

- Ted Bank, Flint, Michigan – started four games at quarterback
- Franklin Cappon, Holland, Michigan – started four games at left tackle, two at right halfback, one at left halfback
- Louis B. Curran, Louisville, Kentucky – end
- Walter Clark Dean, Albion, Michigan – started one game at left end
- Robert J. Dunne, Chicago, Illinois – started five games at left guard; also team captain
- Paul G. Goebel, Grand Rapids, Michigan – started all seven games at right end
- James E. Johns, Lansing, Michigan – started three games at left tackle
- Harry Kipke, Lansing, Michigan – started three games at left halfback, two at right halfback
- Bernard Kirk, Ypsilanti, Michigan – started six games at left end
- Ray Knode, Baltimore, Maryland – quarterback
- Stanley Muirhead, Detroit, Michigan – started all seven games at right tackle
- LeRoy E. Neisch, Detroit, Michigan – end
- Charles C. Petro, Elyria, Ohio – started one game at left guard
- Doug Roby, Holland, Michigan – started three games at fullback
- John G. Searle, Evanston, Illinois – halfback
- Frank Steketee, Grand Rapids, Michigan – started three games at fullback, one game at left halfback, one game at right halfback
- Donald Swan, Detroit, Michigan – guard
- Eddie Usher, Toledo, Ohio – started one game each at fullback, left halfback and right halfback
- Irwin Uteritz, Oak Park, Illinois – started three games at quarterback, one game at right halfback
- Bill Van Orden, Ann Arbor, Michigan – guard
- Ernie Vick, Toledo, Ohio – started all seven games at center
- Hugh E. Wilson, Grand Rapids, Michigan – started all seven games at right guard

=== aMa letter winners ===
At the University of Michigan, players receiving varsity letters were known as "M" men for the varsity letter "M" that they received. Other participants making significant contributions, but not sufficient to receive a full varsity letter, were recognized with what was known as "aMa" status. For their contributions to the 1921 football team, the following 10 players received "aMa" designations:

- William G. Crawforth, Bay City, Michigan – guard
- Stephen M. Garfield, Albion, Michigan – tackle
- John E. Gunther, Goshen, Indiana – fullback
- John Henry, Carnegie, Pennsylvania – guard
- John Keatley, Ann Arbor, Michigan – end
- John Landowski, St. Paul, Minnesota – halfback
- Frederick J. Novy, Ann Arbor, Michigan – guard
- Verne Richards, Detroit, Michigan – end
- C.J. Smith, Ottumwa, Iowa – center
- Don Wieman, Aujunga, California – guard

=== Players not receiving letters ===
Other players listed on Michigan's roster, but who received neither a varsity "M" or an "aMa", include the following:

- Frank Culver, Detroit, Michigan
- Herbert G. Dunphy, Lansing, Michigan
- Percy A. Edwards, reserve, Central Lake, Michigan
- John B. Fairbain, halfback, Joliet, Illinois
- Jackson Keefer, all-freshman team, Dayton, Ohio
- Walter R. Kreinheder, reserve, Cleveland, Ohio
- Homer (?) Martin, reserve, Boise, Idaho
- John S. Perrin, Escanaba, Michigan
- Harold O. Steele, all-freshman team, Sioux City, Iowa

=== Scoring leaders ===
Player	Touchdowns	Extra points	Field goals	Safeties	Total Points
Harry Kipke	5	0	0	0	30
Doug Roby	5	0	0	0	30
Frank Steketee	3	5	1	0	26
Eddie Usher	3	0	0	0	18
Paul G. Goebel	2	6	0	0	18
Clark Dean	1	1	2	0	13
Irwin Uteritz	2	0	0	0	12
Ray Knode	1	2	1	0	11
Ted Bank	1	0	0	0	6
Franklin Cappon	1	0	0	0	6
John Searle	1	0	0	0	6
Ernie Vick	0	0	0	1	2
Totals	26	14	4	1	184

=== Awards and honors ===
Michigan's 1921 first-team All-Americans

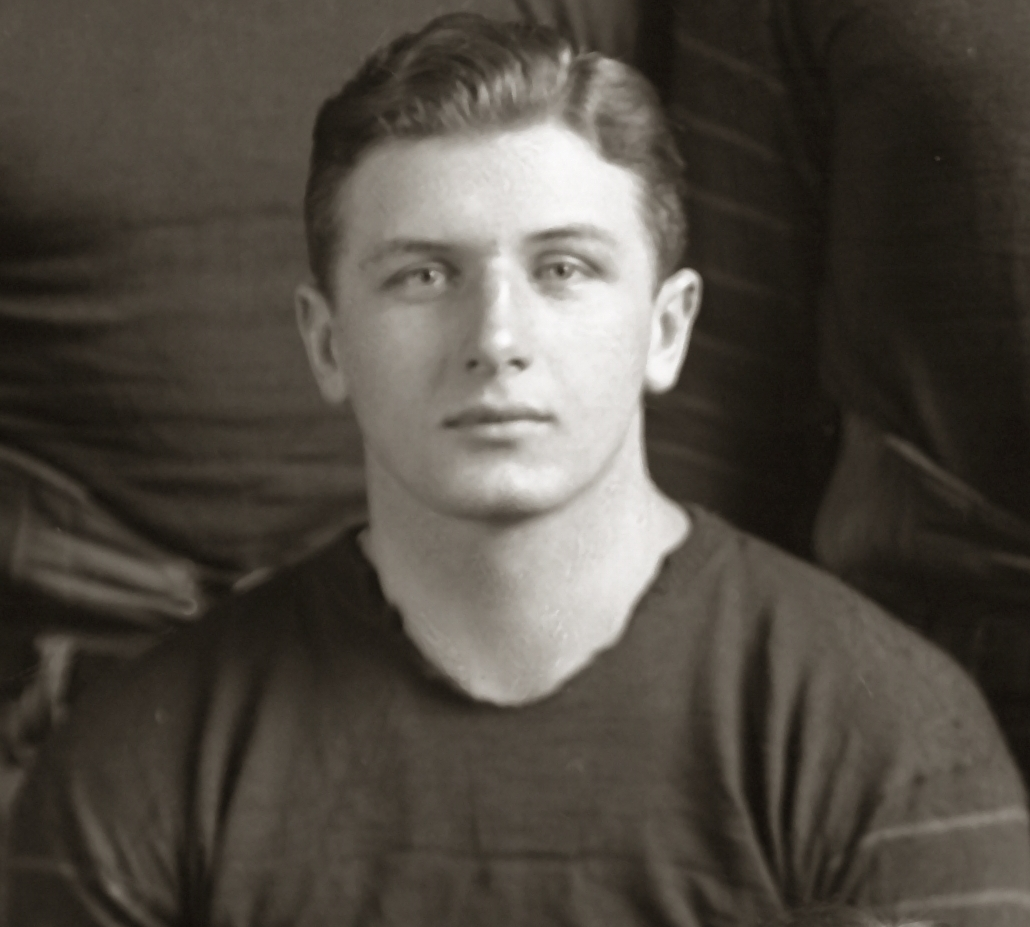
Center Ernie Vick

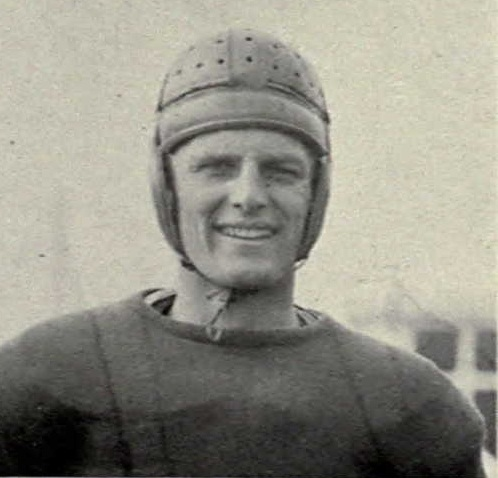
End Paul Goebel

At the end of the 1921 season, two Michigan players received first-team All-America honors. Center Ernie Vick was selected as a first All-American by Walter Camp, and end Paul G. Goebel was selected as a first-team All-American by sports writer Lawrence Perry.

For his All-Big Ten Conference football team, Walter Eckersall of the Chicago Tribune selected Vick and guard Robert J. Dunne as first-team players. Eckersall also named Franklin Cappon as a second-team halfback, Goebel as a third-team end and Irwin Uteritz as a third-team quarterback.

H. G. Salsinger of The Detroit News selected Vick, Cappon and Goebel as first-team All-Big Ten players. Of Vick, Salsinger wrote: "His defensive value was so marked that Yost shifted him to tackle on defense, and here he was the bulwark of the Michigan wall. No player diagnosed a play more quickly than Vick, none moved faster on attack or defense, and none tackled harder or with greater accuracy than Vick."

Luther A. Huston of the International News Service selected only Dunne as a first-team player on his 1921 All-Star Big Ten team.

== Coaching staff ==
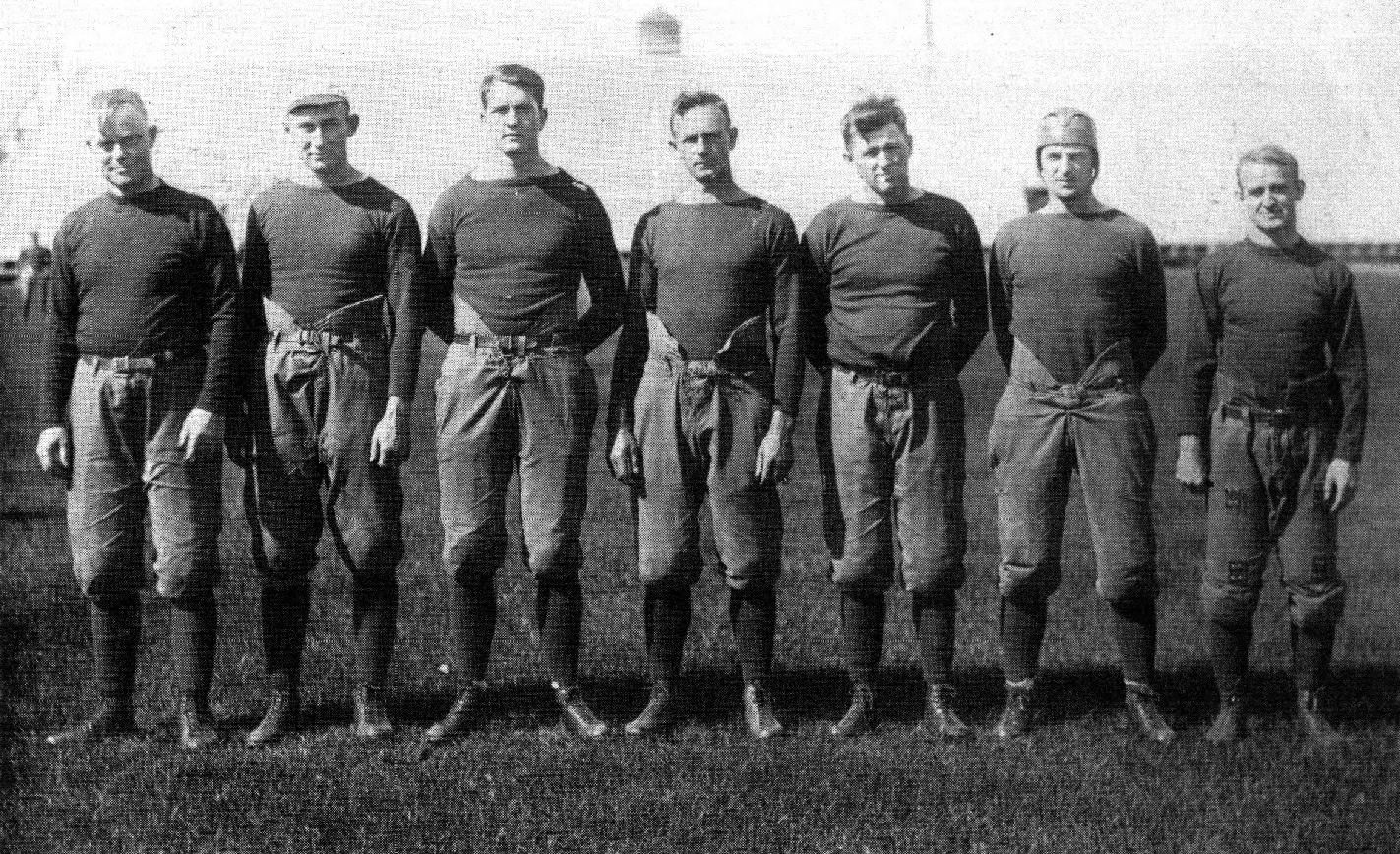
1921 coaching staff: Yost, Wieman, Goetz, Fisher, Mather, Sturzenegger, and Hahn

Michigan's coaching staff in 1921 was led by head coach Fielding H. Yost in his 21st season in the position. In June 1921, he was selected to replace Philip Bartelme as the university's director of intercollegiate athletics, while still retaining his post as head football coach.

After the loss to Ohio State and a combined record of 8–6 in 1919 and 1920, public criticism of the 50-year-old coach developed. In early November 1921, the Grand Rapids alumni association passed a resolution calling on the university to hire a new football coach to replace Yost. The resolution was mailed to university president Marion LeRoy Burton and each member of the Board of Regents. However, in the days that followed, the student body and the Detroit alumni association publicly backed Yost. Yost ultimately served 25 years as Michigan's head coach, compiling a 165–29–10 record.

Yost's assistant coaches for 1921 included Angus Goetz and Tad Wieman, both of whom had played at the tackle position on Yost's 1920 Michigan Wolverines football team. Michigan's head basketball coach (E. J. Mather) and head baseball coach (Ray Fisher) also served as assistant coaches for the football team. A. J. "Sturzy" Sturzenegger was the assistant coach responsible for the halfbacks and ends.

The team's trainer was the former sprint champion, Archie Hahn, who won three gold medals (60 metres, 100 metres, and 200 metres) at the 1904 Summer Olympics. The assistant trainer was William Fallon, and the manager was Alfred L. May.
