= 1921 Wisconsin Badgers football team =

American college football season

1921 Wisconsin Badgers football
- Conference: Big Ten Conference
- Record: 5–1–1 (3–1–1 Big Ten)
- Head coach: John R. Richards (5th season)
- Captain: Guy Sundt
- Home stadium: Camp Randall Stadium

1921 Big Ten Conference football standings
	Conf.					Overall
Team	W		L		T	W		L		T
Iowa $	5	–	0	–	0	7	–	0	–	0
Chicago	4	–	1	–	0	6	–	1	–	0
Ohio State	4	–	1	–	0	5	–	2	–	0
Wisconsin	3	–	1	–	1	5	–	1	–	1
Michigan	2	–	1	–	1	5	–	1	–	1
Indiana	1	–	2	–	0	3	–	4	–	0
Minnesota	2	–	4	–	0	3	–	4	–	0
Illinois	1	–	4	–	0	3	–	4	–	0
Purdue	1	–	4	–	0	1	–	6	–	0
Northwestern	0	–	5	–	0	1	–	6	–	0
$ – Conference champion

The 1921 Wisconsin Badgers football team was an American football team that represented the University of Wisconsin in the 1921 Big Ten Conference football season. The team compiled a 5–1–1 record (3–1–1 against conference opponents), finished in fourth place in the Big Ten Conference, shut out four of seven opponents, and outscored all opponents by a combined total of 141 to 13. John R. Richards was in his fifth year as Wisconsin's head coach.

Fullback Guy Sundt was the team captain. Halfback Al Elliott was selected as a second-team All-American by Norman E. Brown of the Central Press. Four Wisconsin players received first-team All-Big Ten honors: Al Elliott, end Stevens Gould, center George Bunge, and halfback Rollie Williams.

The team played its home games at Camp Randall Stadium. The stadium's seating capacity was increased from 10,000 to 14,000 prior to the 1921 season. During the 1921 season, the average attendance at home games was 11,962.

== Schedule ==
Date	Time	Opponent	Site	Result	Attendance	Source
October 1		Lawrence*	Camp Randall Stadium; Madison, WI	W 28–0		
October 8		South Dakota State*	Camp Randall Stadium; Madison, WI	W 24–3		
October 15		at Northwestern	Northwestern Field; Evanston, IL	W 27–0		
October 22		at Illinois	Illinois Field; Champaign, IL	W 20–0	13,063	
October 29		Minnesota^{†}	Camp Randall Stadium; Madison, WI (rivalry)	W 35–0	24,000	
November 12	1:00 p.m.	Michigan	Camp Randall Stadium; Madison, WI	T 7–7	20,000	
November 19		at Chicago	Stagg Field; Chicago, IL	L 0–3		
*Non-conference game; ^{†}Homecoming; All times are in Central time
