= 1921 Chicago Maroons football team =

American college football season

1921 Chicago Maroons football
- Conference: Big Ten Conference
- Record: 6–1 (4–1 Big Ten)
- Head coach: Amos Alonzo Stagg (30th season)
- Home stadium: Stagg Field

1921 Big Ten Conference football standings
	Conf.					Overall
Team	W		L		T	W		L		T
Iowa $	5	–	0	–	0	7	–	0	–	0
Chicago	4	–	1	–	0	6	–	1	–	0
Ohio State	4	–	1	–	0	5	–	2	–	0
Wisconsin	3	–	1	–	1	5	–	1	–	1
Michigan	2	–	1	–	1	5	–	1	–	1
Indiana	1	–	2	–	0	3	–	4	–	0
Minnesota	2	–	4	–	0	3	–	4	–	0
Illinois	1	–	4	–	0	3	–	4	–	0
Purdue	1	–	4	–	0	1	–	6	–	0
Northwestern	0	–	5	–	0	1	–	6	–	0
$ – Conference champion

The 1921 Chicago Maroons football team was an American football team that represented the University of Chicago during the 1921 Big Ten Conference football season. In their 30th season under head coach Amos Alonzo Stagg, the Maroons compiled a 6–1 record, finished in a tie for second place in the Big Ten Conference, and outscored their opponents by a combined total of 111 to 13.

Notable players on the 1921 team included end Fritz Crisler, quarterback Milton Romney, fullback John Webster Thomas, guard Charles Redmon, and tackle Charles McGuire.

== Schedule ==
Date	Time	Opponent	Site	Result	Attendance	Source
October 1		Northwestern	Stagg Field; Chicago, IL	W 41–0		
October 8		Purdue	Stagg Field; Chicago, IL (rivalry)	W 9–0		
October 22		at Princeton*	Palmer Stadium; Princeton, NJ	W 9–0		
October 29		Colorado*	Stagg Field; Chicago, IL	W 35–0		
November 5	2:00 p.m.	Ohio State	Stagg Field; Chicago, IL	L 0–7	30,000	
November 12		at Illinois	Illinois Field; Champaign, IL	W 14–6	18,872	
November 19		Wisconsin	Stagg Field; Chicago, IL	W 3–0		
*Non-conference game; All times are in Central time
