= 1921 All-Big Ten Conference football team =

American college football all-star team

The 1921 All-Big Ten Conference football team consists of American football players selected to the All-Big Ten Conference teams chosen by various selectors for the 1921 Big Ten Conference football season.

== All Big-Ten selections ==
=== Ends ===
- Fritz Crisler, Chicago (BE-1; CA-1; WE-1; LH-1)
- Stevens Gould, Wisconsin (CA-1; WE-1; LH-1; BE-2 [halfback])
- Truck Myers, Ohio State (WE-1; LH-1)
- Lester Belding, Iowa (BE-1; WE-2)
- Gus Tebell, Wisconsin (BE-2; WE-3)
- Paul G. Goebel, Michigan (BE-2; WE-3)

=== Tackles ===
- Charles McGuire, Chicago (BE-1; CA-1; WE-1; LH-1)
- Duke Slater, Iowa (BE-1; CA-1; WE-1; LH-1)
- James Brader, Wisconsin (BE-2; WE-2)
- Iolas Huffman (BE-2; WE-2)
- Robert H. Spiers, Ohio State (WE-3)
- Ed Carman, Purdue (WE-3)

=== Guards ===
- Robert J. Dunne, Michigan (CA-1; WE-1; LH-1)
- Lloyd Pixley, Ohio State (BE-1; CA-1; LH-1)
- Dean W. Trott, Ohio State (BE-1; WE-1)
- Charles Redmon, Chicago (BE-2; WE-2)
- Albert W. T. Mohr, Jr., Illinois (WE-2)
- Ferdinand Birk, Purdue (BE-2)
- Paul Minick, Iowa (WE-3)
- William G. McCaw, Indiana (WE-3)

=== Centers ===
- Ernie Vick, Michigan (BE-2; CA-1; WE-1)
- George C. Bunge, Wisconsin (BE-1; WE-2; LH-1)
- Jack Heldt, Iowa (WE-3)

=== Quarterbacks ===
- Aubrey Devine, Iowa (BE-1; CA-1; WE-1; LH-1)
- Milton Romney, Chicago (CA-2; WE-2)
- Hoge Workman, Ohio State (BE-2)
- Irwin Uteritz, Michigan (WE-3)

=== Halfbacks ===
- Al Elliott, Wisconsin (BE-1; CA-1; WE-1; LH-1)
- Laurie Walquist, Illinois (CA-2; WE-2; LH-1)
- John D. Stuart, Ohio State (BE-2; CA-1; WE-3)
- Don Peden, Illinois (WE-1)
- Roland Williams, Wisconsin (BE-1)
- Franklin Cappon, Michigan (CA-2; WE-2)
- Earl Martineau, Minnesota (WE-3)

=== Fullbacks ===
- Gordon Locke, Iowa (BE-1; CA-1; WE-1; LH-1)
- Guy Sundt, Wisconsin (BE-2; CA-2; WE-3)
- John Webster Thomas, Chicago (WE-2)

== Key ==
BE = Billy Evans, "N.E.A. Sports Expert; American League Umpire; and Football Official"

CA = Chicago American, selected by Harold Johnson

WE = Walter Eckersall for the Chicago Tribune

LH = Luther A. Huston of the International News Service

== See also ==
- 1921 College Football All-America Team
