= 1921 Minnesota Golden Gophers football team =

American college football season

1921 Minnesota Golden Gophers football
- Conference: Big Ten Conference
- Record: 3–4 (2–4 Big Ten)
- Head coach: Henry L. Williams (22nd season)
- Captain: Larry Teberg
- Home stadium: Northrop Field

1921 Big Ten Conference football standings
	Conf.					Overall
Team	W		L		T	W		L		T
Iowa $	5	–	0	–	0	7	–	0	–	0
Chicago	4	–	1	–	0	6	–	1	–	0
Ohio State	4	–	1	–	0	5	–	2	–	0
Wisconsin	3	–	1	–	1	5	–	1	–	1
Michigan	2	–	1	–	1	5	–	1	–	1
Indiana	1	–	2	–	0	3	–	4	–	0
Minnesota	2	–	4	–	0	3	–	4	–	0
Illinois	1	–	4	–	0	3	–	4	–	0
Purdue	1	–	4	–	0	1	–	6	–	0
Northwestern	0	–	5	–	0	1	–	6	–	0
$ – Conference champion

The 1921 Minnesota Golden Gophers football team represented the University of Minnesota in the 1921 Big Ten Conference football season. In their 22nd and final year under head coach Henry L. Williams, the Golden Gophers compiled a 3–4 record (2–4 against Big Ten Conference opponents) and were outscored by their opponents by a combined score of 141 to 60.

Despite being in the Western Conference (Big Ten) together since 1913, this season had the first matchup between Minnesota and Ohio State.

== Schedule ==
Date	Time	Opponent	Site	Result	Attendance	Source
October 1		North Dakota*	Northrop Field; Minneapolis, MN	W 19–0	8,000	
October 8		Northwestern	Northrop Field; Minneapolis, MN	W 28–0	15,000	
October 15		at Ohio State	Ohio Stadium; Columbus, OH	L 0–27	22,000	
October 22		Indiana	Northrop Field; Minneapolis, MN	W 6–0	20,000	
October 29		at Wisconsin	Camp Randall Stadium; Madison, WI (rivalry)	L 0–35	24,000	
November 5		Iowa^{†}	Northrop Field; Minneapolis, MN (rivalry)	L 7–41	23,000	
November 19	1:00 p.m.	at Michigan	Ferry Field; Ann Arbor, MI (Little Brown Jug)	L 0–38	30,000–33,000	
*Non-conference game; ^{†}Homecoming; All times are in Central time

== Game summaries ==
=== Michigan ===
Week 7: Minnesota at Michigan

Team	1	2	3	4	Total
Minnesota	0	0	0	0	0
• Michigan	10	7	7	14	38

- Date: November 19, 1921
- Location: Ferry Field
  Ann Arbor, MI
- Game start: 2:00 p.m.
- Game attendance: 30,000
- Referee: Hackett (West Point)

In the final game of the 1921 season, Minnesota lost to Michigan by a 38–0 score. The game was played at Ferry Field in Ann Arbor, Michigan, before a crowd estimated at 33,000 spectators, first in drizzling rain and then in cold weather. Prior to the start of the game, a ceremony was held dedicating a bronze memorial tablet honoring four Michigan athletes who died in World War I.

Michigan's quarterback Irwin Uteritz scored two touchdowns, including a 65-yard interception return that the Detroit Free Press called "the most thrilling achievement of the afternoon." Michigan end Clark Dean added a field goal from the 50-yard line that the Free Press called "the longest of the season, and, in most respects, the greatest any Michigan man ever exhibited to the gaze of paid spectators." Franklin Cappon scored on a 60-yard touchdown run, and Paul G. Goebel kicked all five extra points and, unguarded late in the game, scored a touchdown on a 30-yard pass from Doug Roby that the Free Press called Michigan's "most spectacular pass" since 1907. Frank Steketee also scored a touchdown when he jumped on a Cappon fumble in the end zone. The game marked the worst defeat that a Minnesota football team had suffered to that point in the program's history, exceeding a 41–7 loss to Iowa earlier in the 1921 season.
