= 1921 Iowa Hawkeyes football team =

American college football season

1921 Iowa Hawkeyes football
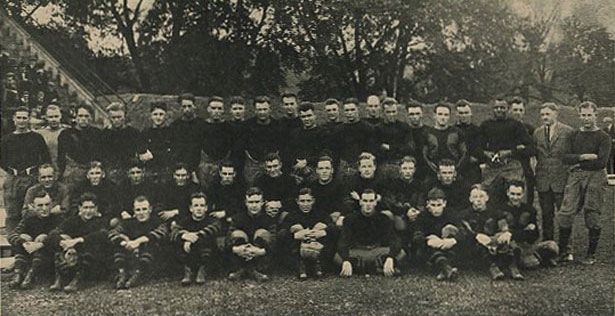

National champion (Billingsley) Co-national champion (Davis) Big Ten champion
- Conference: Big Ten Conference
- Record: 7–0 (5–0 Big Ten)
- Head coach: Howard Jones (6th season)
- Offensive scheme: Single-wing
- Home stadium: Iowa Field

Uniform
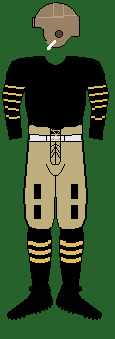

1921 Big Ten Conference football standings
	Conf.					Overall
Team	W		L		T	W		L		T
Iowa $	5	–	0	–	0	7	–	0	–	0
Chicago	4	–	1	–	0	6	–	1	–	0
Ohio State	4	–	1	–	0	5	–	2	–	0
Wisconsin	3	–	1	–	1	5	–	1	–	1
Michigan	2	–	1	–	1	5	–	1	–	1
Indiana	1	–	2	–	0	3	–	4	–	0
Minnesota	2	–	4	–	0	3	–	4	–	0
Illinois	1	–	4	–	0	3	–	4	–	0
Purdue	1	–	4	–	0	1	–	6	–	0
Northwestern	0	–	5	–	0	1	–	6	–	0
$ – Conference champion

The 1921 Iowa Hawkeyes football team was an American football team that represented the University of Iowa as a member of the Big Ten Conference during the 1921 Big Ten football season. In their sixth season under head coach Howard Jones, the Hawkeyes compiled a perfect 7–0 record (5–0 in conference games), won the Big Ten championship, and 185 to 36. The team was retroactively selected as the 1921 national champion by the Billingsley Report and as a co-national champion by Parke H. Davis. The season was part of a 20-game winning streak that began on November 6, 1920, and continued until October 20, 1923.

Quarterback Aubrey Devine was a consensus first-team All American. Devine tallied 895 rushing yards, still an Iowa record for a quarterback, and also led the team in passing and scoring.

Five Iowa players were selected by Collier's Weekly or Walter Eckersall as first-team players on the 1921 All-Western college football team: Devine (Colliers-1, Eckersall-1); fullback Gordon Locke (Colliers-1, Eckersall-1); tackle Duke Slater (Colliers-1, Eckersall-1); and end Lester Belding (Colliers-1, Eckersall-2).

The team played its home games at Iowa Field in Iowa City, Iowa.

== Preseason ==
Howard Jones was in his sixth year at Iowa in 1921, having coached the Hawkeyes to a 23–14–1 record from 1916 to 1920. In 1919, end Lester Belding was named All-America, and Belding, quarterback Aubrey Devine, tackle Duke Slater and fullback Fred Lohman were named All-Big Ten. In 1920, Belding, Devine and Slater were named All-Big Ten. The Hawkeyes had not won a Big Ten championship since 1900. Iowa had a three-game winning streak going into the 1921 season.

== Schedule ==
Date	Opponent	Site	Result	Attendance	Source
October 1	Knox (IL)*	Iowa Field; Iowa City, IA	W 52–14		
October 8	Notre Dame*	Iowa Field; Iowa City, IA	W 10–7		
October 15	Illinois^{†}	Iowa Field; Iowa City, IA	W 14–2		
October 29	at Purdue	Stuart Field; West Lafayette, IN	W 13–6		
November 5	at Minnesota	Northrop Field; Minneapolis, MN (rivalry)	W 41–7	23,000	
November 12	Indiana	Iowa Field; Iowa City, IA	W 41–0		
November 19	at Northwestern	Northwestern Field; Evanston, IL	W 14–0		
*Non-conference game; ^{†}Homecoming

== Season ==
=== Knox ===
Iowa opened the 1921 season on October 1 with a game against Knox College. The Hawkeyes crushed the opposition 52–14. Knox did not make a single first down.

=== Notre Dame ===
On October 8, Notre Dame came to Iowa City. It was the first meeting between the Hawkeyes and the Irish. Notre Dame had a twenty-game winning streak, having gone 9–0 in 1919 and 1920. The Irish had already beaten Kalamazoo and DePauw in 1921 by a combined score of 113–10. Notre Dame coach Knute Rockne, widely regarded as the greatest football coach of all time, made a famous and unprecedented decision before the game. The navy uniforms of his team were too similar in color to the black uniforms of the Hawkeyes, so Rockne decided to use green uniforms instead. Fifty-six years later, Notre Dame coach Dan Devine decided to use green uniforms for the 1977 game against Southern California. The Fighting Irish won 49–19 en route to a national championship and the legend of the Notre Dame Green Machines was born.

In 1921, Notre Dame was captained by All-American end Eddie Anderson, who later coached Iowa Ironmen team of 1939. The Irish were also led by Hunk Anderson, who later coached Notre Dame from 1931 to 1933. In the game, Iowa scored first when future All-American fullback Gordon Locke ran one yard for a touchdown in the first quarter. Duke Slater blocked three Notre Dame men on the touchdown, but Anderson was able to get by him. Locke ran over the All-American for the first points of the day. Aubrey Devine kicked the extra point and Iowa led 7–0. Devine also kicked a 33-yard field goal later in the first quarter to put the Hawkeyes up 10–0. That field goal ended up deciding the game.

The only points the Irish scored came in the second quarter. All-American halfback Johnny Mohardt threw a 30-yard touchdown pass to Ed Kelley. All-American tackle Buck Shaw kicked the extra point, but Iowa still led, 10–7. That ended up being the final score. However, both Iowa and Notre Dame came close to scoring again on several occasions. Both teams advanced to the 5-yard line of their respective opponent in the third quarter, but both were kept out of the end zone. Mohardt missed a 40-yard drop kick in the fourth quarter that would have tied the game. Olympian Gus Desch led Notre Dame to the 7-yard line of Iowa later in the fourth quarter, but the Hawkeyes held again. The game ended at midfield.

Iowa handed Notre Dame their first loss since 1918. The Hawkeyes ended the twenty-game winning streak of the Irish and extended their own winning streak to five games. Notre Dame won their next eight games to finish 10–1. They did not give up more than seven points in a game for the rest of the season. The Irish did not lose again until they were beaten by Nebraska in their final game of 1922. Iowa and Notre Dame did not meet again until 1939, when the Hawkeyes beat the Irish 7–6. Notre Dame was 6–0 and ranked third in the US when they lost to the Hawkeyes. Iowa beat the Irish for the third consecutive time in 1940 by the score of 7–0, before which Notre Dame was again 6–0 and ranked seventh in the US. The Irish finally beat the Hawkeyes in 1945 by the score of 56–0.

=== Illinois ===
Iowa played their homecoming game on October 15. An Illinois team of the great Robert Zuppke was the opponent. The Illini were two years removed from a national championship in 1919. The 1921 team had already beaten South Dakota by the score of 52–0. Thousands of Hawkeye alumni, including a man from Panama and another from Trinidad, returned to Iowa Field to see Iowa beat Illinois for the first time since 1907 by the score of 14–2. Gordon Locke had his best game of the season, carrying the ball 37 times and rushing for 202 yards, a Hawkeye record.

=== Purdue ===
On October 29, Iowa made their first road trip of the season, traveling to West Lafayette. Purdue had lost their first three games of 1921 by a combined score of 51–0. The Boilermakers scored their first points of the season against the Hawkeyes, but Iowa won the game 13–6 on a field covered with several inches of water. Aubrey Devine scored the first Hawkeye touchdown but missed the extra point. He later scored the touchdown that won the game on a memorable punt return and made the extra point. Devine accounted for all of the points for Iowa.

=== Minnesota ===
Iowa played Minnesota in Minneapolis on November 5. Henry L. Williams, the coach of the Gophers and Hall of Fame inductee in the inaugural class in 1951, was in his final year at Minnesota, having coached the Gophers to a 136–31–11 record from 1900 to 1921. The Hawkeyes handed Minnesota their worst loss under Williams and their second-worst loss ever, winning 41–7. It was the most points the Gophers had ever allowed in forty years of varsity football. Aubrey Devine had his best game of the season, scoring twenty-nine points and passing for the other twelve points. Devine rushed for four touchdowns, passed for two touchdowns and kicked five extra points. He had 484 total yards: 162 rushing yards, 122 passing yards and 200 return yards on kicks, punts and interceptions.

=== Indiana ===
The final Iowa home game of the season was played on November 12 against Indiana. The Hoosiers lost to Minnesota in their first Big Ten game by the score of 6–0. Likewise, the Hawkeyes shut out Indiana, 41–0. It was the worst loss for Indiana since 1914. Aubrey Devine had another huge game, rushing for four touchdowns and kicking four extra points. He rushed for 183 yards and passed for 102 yards. Devine scored a combined 57 points on November 5 and 12.

=== Northwestern ===
Iowa played their final game of the season on November 19 in Evanston. Northwestern had already beaten DePaul but the Purple had lost their other five games by a combined score of 106–0. The Hawkeyes handed Northwestern their sixth shutout loss of the season, winning 14–0. The victory gave Iowa its first perfect season and outright Big Ten championship. The Hawkeyes never trailed in 1921. Aubrey Devine and Gordon Locke finished first and second in the Big Ten in scoring, respectively.

== Postseason ==
Iowa went 7–0 and won the Big Ten championship. The Hawkeyes were invited to play California Golden Bears in the 1922 Rose Bowl, but the Big Ten forced Iowa to turn down the invitation. Aubrey Devine, Duke Slater and Gordon Locke were named All-American. Devine, Slater, Locke, Lester Belding, center John C. Heldt, guard Chester Mead and end Max Kadesky were named All-Big Ten. Iowa was named the 1921 national champion by Parke H. Davis, a selector who is recognized by the NCAA.
