= 1921 Illinois Fighting Illini football team =

American college football season

1921 Illinois Fighting Illini football
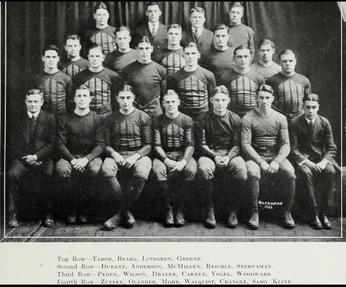
- Conference: Big Ten Conference
- Record: 3–4 (1–4 Big Ten)
- Head coach: Robert Zuppke (9th season)
- Offensive scheme: Single-wing
- Captain: L. W. Walquist
- Home stadium: Illinois Field

Uniform
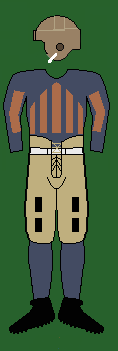

1921 Big Ten Conference football standings
	Conf.					Overall
Team	W		L		T	W		L		T
Iowa $	5	–	0	–	0	7	–	0	–	0
Chicago	4	–	1	–	0	6	–	1	–	0
Ohio State	4	–	1	–	0	5	–	2	–	0
Wisconsin	3	–	1	–	1	5	–	1	–	1
Michigan	2	–	1	–	1	5	–	1	–	1
Indiana	1	–	2	–	0	3	–	4	–	0
Minnesota	2	–	4	–	0	3	–	4	–	0
Illinois	1	–	4	–	0	3	–	4	–	0
Purdue	1	–	4	–	0	1	–	6	–	0
Northwestern	0	–	5	–	0	1	–	6	–	0
$ – Conference champion

The 1921 Illinois Fighting Illini football team was an American football team that represented the University of Illinois during the 1921 Big Ten Conference football season. In their ninth season under head coach Robert Zuppke, the Illini compiled a 3–4 record and finished in a tie for eighth place in the Big Ten Conference. Halfback L. W. Walquist was the team captain.

== Schedule ==
Date	Opponent	Site	Result	Attendance	Source
October 8	South Dakota*	Illinois Field; Champaign, IL	W 52–0	7,404	
October 15	at Iowa	Iowa Field; Iowa City, IA	L 2–14	13,516	
October 22	Wisconsin	Illinois Field; Champaign, IL	L 0–20	13,063	
October 29	Michigan	Illinois Field; Champaign, IL (rivalry)	L 0–3	13,171	
November 5	DePauw*	Illinois Field; Champaign, IL	W 21–0	5,814	
November 12	Chicago	Illinois Field; Champaign, IL	L 6–14	18,872	
November 19	at Ohio State	Ohio Field; Columbus, OH (rivalry)	W 7–0	18,118	
*Non-conference game

== Awards and honors ==
- Otto Vogel, guard: All-American
- Jack Crangle, fullback: All-American
