= 1921 Ohio State Buckeyes football team =

American college football season

1921 Ohio State Buckeyes football
- Conference: Big Ten Conference, Ohio Athletic Conference
- Record: 5–2 (4–1 Big Ten, 1–1 OAC)
- Head coach: John Wilce (9th season)
- Captain: Cyril E. Myers
- Home stadium: Ohio Field

1921 Big Ten Conference football standings
	Conf.					Overall
Team	W		L		T	W		L		T
Iowa $	5	–	0	–	0	7	–	0	–	0
Chicago	4	–	1	–	0	6	–	1	–	0
Ohio State	4	–	1	–	0	5	–	2	–	0
Wisconsin	3	–	1	–	1	5	–	1	–	1
Michigan	2	–	1	–	1	5	–	1	–	1
Indiana	1	–	2	–	0	3	–	4	–	0
Minnesota	2	–	4	–	0	3	–	4	–	0
Illinois	1	–	4	–	0	3	–	4	–	0
Purdue	1	–	4	–	0	1	–	6	–	0
Northwestern	0	–	5	–	0	1	–	6	–	0
$ – Conference champion

1921 Ohio Athletic Conference football standings
	Conf.					Overall
Team	W		L		T	W		L		T
Miami (OH) $	7	–	0	–	0	8	–	0	–	0
St. Xavier	1	–	0	–	0	6	–	2	–	0
Oberlin	7	–	0	–	1	7	–	0	–	1
Case	6	–	1	–	2	6	–	2	–	2
Wooster	6	–	2	–	0	6	–	2	–	0
Denison	5	–	2	–	0	5	–	3	–	0
Akron	4	–	3	–	0	5	–	3	–	0
Ohio Northern	4	–	3	–	0	5	–	4	–	0
Ohio State	1	–	1	–	0	5	–	2	–	0
Wittenberg	3	–	3	–	2	4	–	3	–	2
Kenyon	1	–	1	–	4	1	–	1	–	5
Ohio	1	–	1	–	0	4	–	4	–	1
Otterbein	1	–	3	–	2	1	–	5	–	2
Western Reserve	2	–	5	–	1	2	–	7	–	1
Hiram	1	–	4	–	2	2	–	4	–	2
Ohio Wesleyan	1	–	6	–	1	1	–	6	–	1
Mount Union	0	–	5	–	1	1	–	6	–	1
Cincinnati	0	–	4	–	0	3	–	6	–	0
Heidelberg	0	–	7	–	0	0	–	7	–	1
$ – Conference champion

The 1921 Ohio State Buckeyes football team represented Ohio State University in the 1921 Big Ten Conference football season. The Buckeyes compiled a 5–2 record while outscoring opponents 110–14. The 14 points allowed came in Ohio State's only losses. The Buckeyes' 1921 loss to Oberlin remains their last loss to a team from the state of Ohio.

Despite being in the Western Conference (Big Ten) together since 1913, this season had the first matchup between Ohio State and Minnesota.

== Schedule ==
Date	Time	Opponent	Site	Result	Attendance	Source
October 1		Ohio Wesleyan	Ohio Field; Columbus, OH	W 28–0		
October 8		Oberlin	Ohio Field; Columbus, OH	L 6–7		
October 15		Minnesota	Ohio Field; Columbus, OH	W 27–0	22,000	
October 22		at Michigan	Ferry Field; Ann Arbor, MI (rivalry)	W 14–0	40,500	
November 5	3:00 p.m.	at Chicago	Stagg Field; Chicago, IL	W 7–0	30,000	
November 12		Purdue	Ohio Field; Columbus, OH	W 28–0		
November 19		Illinois	Ohio Field; Columbus, OH (rivalry)	L 0–7	18,118	
All times are in Eastern time

== Coaching staff ==
- John Wilce, head coach, ninth year
