= 1921 Purdue Boilermakers football team =

American college football season

1921 Purdue Boilermakers football
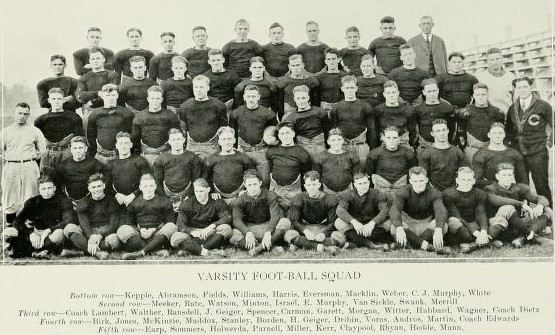
- Conference: Big Ten Conference
- Record: 1–6 (1–4 Big Ten)
- Head coach: William Henry Dietz (1st season)
- Captain: Edmund R. Carman
- Home stadium: Stuart Field

1921 Big Ten Conference football standings
	Conf.					Overall
Team	W		L		T	W		L		T
Iowa $	5	–	0	–	0	7	–	0	–	0
Chicago	4	–	1	–	0	6	–	1	–	0
Ohio State	4	–	1	–	0	5	–	2	–	0
Wisconsin	3	–	1	–	1	5	–	1	–	1
Michigan	2	–	1	–	1	5	–	1	–	1
Indiana	1	–	2	–	0	3	–	4	–	0
Minnesota	2	–	4	–	0	3	–	4	–	0
Illinois	1	–	4	–	0	3	–	4	–	0
Purdue	1	–	4	–	0	1	–	6	–	0
Northwestern	0	–	5	–	0	1	–	6	–	0
$ – Conference champion

The 1921 Purdue Boilermakers football team was an American football team that represented Purdue University during the 1921 Big Ten Conference football season. In their first season under head coach William Henry Dietz, the Boilermakers compiled a 1–6 record, finished in a tie for eighth place in the Big Ten Conference with a 1–4 record against conference opponents, and were outscored by their opponents by a total of 95 to 9. Edmund R. Carman was the team captain.

== Schedule ==
Date	Opponent	Site	Result	Attendance	Source
October 1	Wabash*	Stuart Field; West Lafayette, IN	L 0–9		
October 8	at Chicago	Stagg Field; Chicago, IL (rivalry)	L 0–9		
October 15	Notre Dame*	Stuart Field; West Lafayette, IN (rivalry)	L 0–33	7,500	
October 29	Iowa	Stuart Field; West Lafayette, IN	L 6–13		
November 5	Northwestern^{†}	Stuart Field; West Lafayette, IN	W 3–0		
November 12	at Ohio State	Ohio Field; Columbus, OH	L 0–28		
November 19	at Indiana	Jordan Field; Bloomington, IN (Old Oaken Bucket)	L 0–3		
*Non-conference game; ^{†}Homecoming

== Roster ==
- Abramson
- Andrus
- Ferdinand Birk, T
- Borden
- Edmund Carman, E
- W. L. Claypool, T
- Dribin
- Earp
- George Eversman, HB
- Fields
- Garett
- Hans Geiger, G
- J. Geiger
- A. Harris, QB
- Hedde
- Dan Holwerda, QB
- Hubbard
- Israel
- Jones
- Kepple
- R. C. Kerr, E
- Paul Macklin, QB
- Maddox
- Mann
- Martin
- McKinzie
- John Meeker, HB
- Claude Merrill, G
- R. F. Miller, T
- Minton
- Ray Morgan, E
- Charles J. Murphy, G
- Edgar Murphy, FB
- Parnell
- Ransdell
- Edwin Rate, HB
- Rhyan
- Sommers
- Walter Spencer, T
- Stanley
- Bill Swank, G
- Van Sickle
- Voras
- Earl Wagner
- Walther
- Bob Watson, FB
- Weber
- White
- Williams
- Witter
