= John Landowski =

American track and field athlete and football player

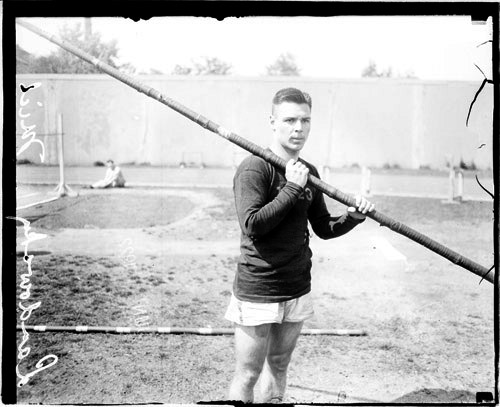
- Landowski at Stagg Field, 1922

Personal information
- Full name: John Stanley Landowski
- Nationality: American
- Education: University of Michigan

Sport
- Sport: Track and field athletics
- Event: Pole vault

John Stanley "Landie" Landowski (born 22 January 1893) was an American track and field athlete and football player. He specialized in the pole vault and also competed in the javelin throw. He won the 1922 NCAA Championship in the pole vault.

Landowski was a native of Milwaukee, Wisconsin.

He enrolled at the University of Michigan's College of Literature Science and Arts where he competed in the pole vault and javelin throw for the Michigan Wolverines men's track and field team. He tied with Norris of the University of California for the 1922 NCAA Champion in the pole vault, with both athletes clearing a height of 12 feet, 6 inches. Landowski also won the Big Ten Conference championship and was selected as an All-American in 1922. He was the first University of Michigan track and field athlete to be recognized as an All-American.

He also played college football as a halfback at Michigan. He won an aMa letter as a member of the 1921 Michigan Wolverines football team.

Landowski was posthumously inducted into the University of Michigan Track and Field Hall of Fame in 2011. R.G. Lynch, sports editor of The Milwaukee Journal, described him as "a nifty pole vaulter and a sweet halfback who hit so hard that he broke his brittle bones and never could be used by Yost."
