= 1921 Indiana Hoosiers football team =

American college football season

1921 Indiana Hoosiers football
- Conference: Big Ten Conference
- Record: 3–4 (1–2 Big Ten)
- Head coach: Ewald O. Stiehm (6th season)
- Captain: Johnny Kyle
- Home stadium: Jordan Field

1921 Big Ten Conference football standings
	Conf.					Overall
Team	W		L		T	W		L		T
Iowa $	5	–	0	–	0	7	–	0	–	0
Chicago	4	–	1	–	0	6	–	1	–	0
Ohio State	4	–	1	–	0	5	–	2	–	0
Wisconsin	3	–	1	–	1	5	–	1	–	1
Michigan	2	–	1	–	1	5	–	1	–	1
Indiana	1	–	2	–	0	3	–	4	–	0
Minnesota	2	–	4	–	0	3	–	4	–	0
Illinois	1	–	4	–	0	3	–	4	–	0
Purdue	1	–	4	–	0	1	–	6	–	0
Northwestern	0	–	5	–	0	1	–	6	–	0
$ – Conference champion

The 1921 Indiana Hoosiers football team represented the Indiana Hoosiers in the 1921 Big Ten Conference football season. The Hoosiers played their home games at Jordan Field in Bloomington, Indiana. The team was coached by Ewald O. Stiehm, in his sixth and final year as head coach.

== Schedule ==
Date	Opponent	Site	Result	Attendance	Source
September 24	Franklin (IN)*	Jordan Field; Bloomington, IN	W 47–0		
October 1	Kalamazoo*	Jordan Field; Bloomington, IN	W 29–0		
October 8	at Harvard*	Harvard Stadium; Boston, MA	L 0–19	15,000	
October 22	at Minnesota	Northrop Field; Minneapolis, MN	L 0–6	20,000	
October 29	vs. Notre Dame*	Washington Park; Indianapolis, IN	L 7–28	20,000	
November 12	at Iowa	Iowa Field; Iowa City, IA	L 0–41		
November 19	Purdue	Jordan Field; Bloomington, IN (rivalry)	W 3–0		
*Non-conference game
