= 1921 Northwestern Purple football team =

American college football season

1921 Northwestern Purple football
- Conference: Big Ten Conference
- Record: 1–6 (0–5 Big Ten)
- Head coach: Elmer McDevitt (2nd season)
- Captain: Jack Hathaway
- Home stadium: Northwestern Field

1921 Big Ten Conference football standings
	Conf.					Overall
Team	W		L		T	W		L		T
Iowa $	5	–	0	–	0	7	–	0	–	0
Chicago	4	–	1	–	0	6	–	1	–	0
Ohio State	4	–	1	–	0	5	–	2	–	0
Wisconsin	3	–	1	–	1	5	–	1	–	1
Michigan	2	–	1	–	1	5	–	1	–	1
Indiana	1	–	2	–	0	3	–	4	–	0
Minnesota	2	–	4	–	0	3	–	4	–	0
Illinois	1	–	4	–	0	3	–	4	–	0
Purdue	1	–	4	–	0	1	–	6	–	0
Northwestern	0	–	5	–	0	1	–	6	–	0
$ – Conference champion

The 1921 Purple Wildcats team represented Northwestern University during the 1921 Big Ten Conference football season. In their second year under head coach Elmer McDevitt, the Purple compiled a 1–6 record (0–5 against Big Ten Conference opponents) and finished in last place in the Big Ten Conference.

== Schedule ==
Date	Opponent	Site	Result	Source
September 24	Beloit*	Northwestern Field; Evanston, IL	L 0–7	
October 1	at Chicago	Stagg Field; Chicago, IL	L 0–41	
October 8	at Minnesota	Northrop Field; Minneapolis, MN	L 0–28	
October 15	Wisconsin	Northwestern Field; Evanston, IL	L 0–27	
October 29	DePaul*	Northwestern Field; Evanston, IL	W 34–0	
November 5	at Purdue	Stuart Field; West Lafayette, IN	L 0–3	
November 19	Iowa	Northwestern Field; Evanston, IL	L 0–14	
*Non-conference game
