= Elmer McDevitt =

American football player and coach (1887–1940)

Biographical details
- Born: December 9, 1887; Cloquet, Minnesota, U.S.
- Died: May 4, 1940 (aged 52); Duluth, Minnesota, U.S.

Playing career
- 1910–1911: Yale
- Position: Guard

Coaching career (HC unless noted)
- 1912: Yale (field)
- 1912: Navy (line)
- 1913: Minnesota (line)
- 1914: Northwestern (line)
- 1920–1921: Northwestern
- 1922: Denver (assistant)
- 1923–1924: Denver

Head coaching record
- Overall: 14–15–2

Accomplishments and honors

Awards
- Second-team All-American (1911)

Elmer William McDevitt (December 9, 1887 – May 4, 1940) was an American college football player and coach. He served as the head football coach at Northwestern University from 1920 to 1921 and at the University of Denver from 1923 to 1924, compiling a career head coaching record of 14–15–2.

McDevitt was born on December 9, 1887, in Cloquet, Minnesota. He attended Duluth Central High School and Phillips Academy in Andover, Massachusetts for prep school. He then attended Yale University, where he played on the Yale Bulldogs football team as a guard in 1910 and 1911, before graduating in 1912.

In 1912 McDevitt served as field coach for the Yale football team before joining the Navy football team as line coach late in the season. He coach the linemen for the Minnesota Golden Gophers football team in 1913. In 1914 he moved to Northwestern as line coach. McDevitt assisted Fred J. Murphy at the University of Denver in 1922 before succeeding him as head football coach the following season. McDevitt practiced law in Duluth, Minnesota at the time.

== Head coaching record ==
Year	Team	Overall	Conference	Standing
Northwestern Purple (Big Ten Conference) (1920–1921)
1920	Northwestern	3–4	2–3	7th
1921	Northwestern	1–6	0–5	10th
Northwestern:		4–10	2–8	
Denver Pioneers (Rocky Mountain Conference) (1923–1924)
1923	Denver	6–3	4–3	5th
1924	Denver	4–2–2	3–2–2	T–2nd
Denver:		10–5–2	7–5–2	
Total:		14–15–2		
