= Ray Knode =

American baseball and football player (1901–1982)

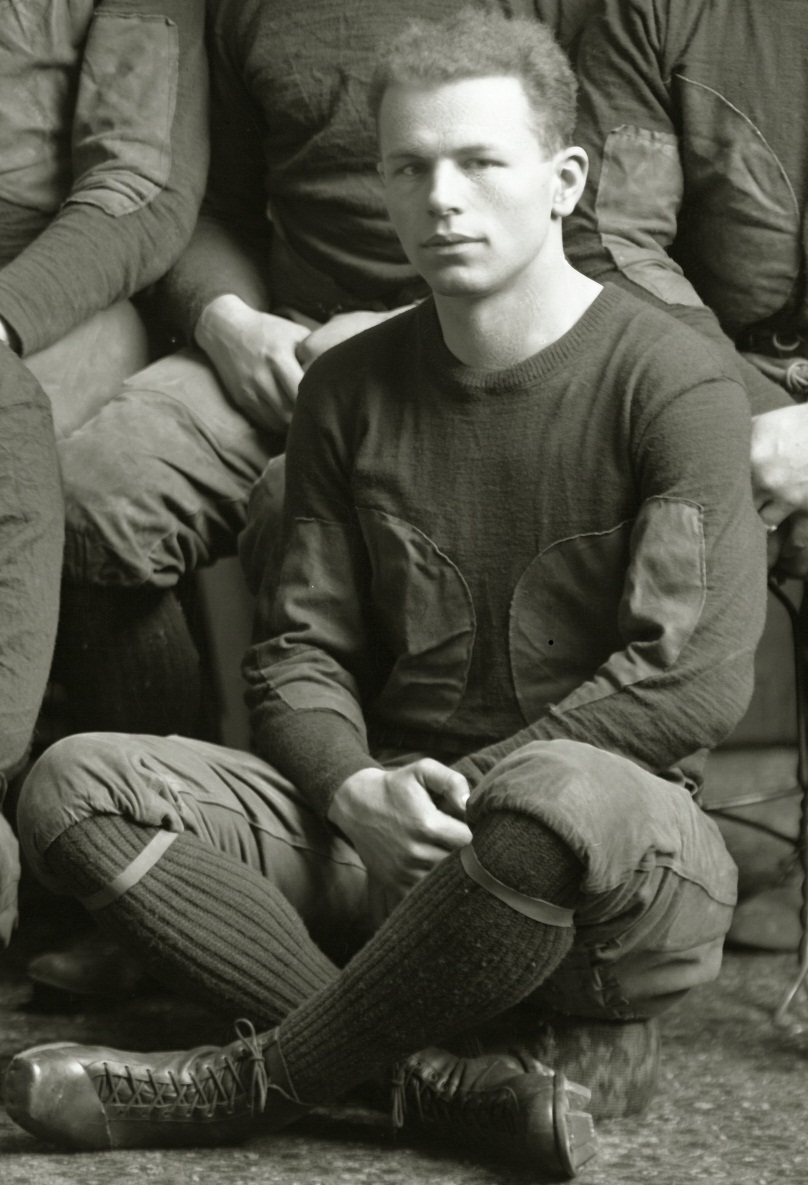
- First baseman
- Born: January 28, 1901; Westminster, Maryland
- Died: April 13, 1982 (aged 81); Battle Creek, Michigan
- Batted: Left Threw: Left

MLB debut
- June 30, 1923, for the Cleveland Indians

Last MLB appearance
- September 26, 1926, for the Cleveland Indians

MLB statistics
- Batting average: .266
- Hits: 55
- Home runs: 2
- Runs batted in: 32
- Stats at Baseball Reference

Teams
- Cleveland Indians (1923–1926)

Robert Troxell "Ray" Knode (January 28, 1901 – April 13, 1982) was an American Major League Baseball baseball and college football player. He played for four seasons as a first baseman with the Cleveland Indians from 1923 to 1926.

Knode attended the University of Maryland, where he played on the football team as a quarterback from 1916 to 1919. He later attended the University of Michigan, where he also played quarterback from 1921 to 1922.

His older brother, Kenneth T. Knode followed a similar career path. He played professional baseball with the St. Louis Cardinals and as a quarterback at both Maryland and Michigan.

He later became the athletic director of Battle Creek Public Schools in Calhoun County, Michigan where he coached baseball, basketball, and football in addition to being head of the athletic program.
