= Eddie Usher =

American football player (1898–1973)

- Usher with the Independents in 1922

Profile
- Position: Back

Personal information
- Born: June 19, 1898; Toledo, Ohio, U.S.
- Died: April 1973 (aged 74)
- Listed height: 5 ft 11 in (1.80 m)
- Listed weight: 192 lb (87 kg)

Career information
- College: Michigan

Career history
- Buffalo All-Americans (1921); Rock Island Independents (1922); Green Bay Packers (1922, 1924); Kansas City Blues (1924)

Awards and highlights
- National champion (1918)

Career statistics
- Games played: 18
- Starts: 10
- Touchdowns: 2
- Stats at Pro Football Reference

Edward Usher (June 19, 1898 – April 1973) was an American football fullback and halfback. He played college football for the Michigan Wolverines football team in 1918, 1920 and 1921.

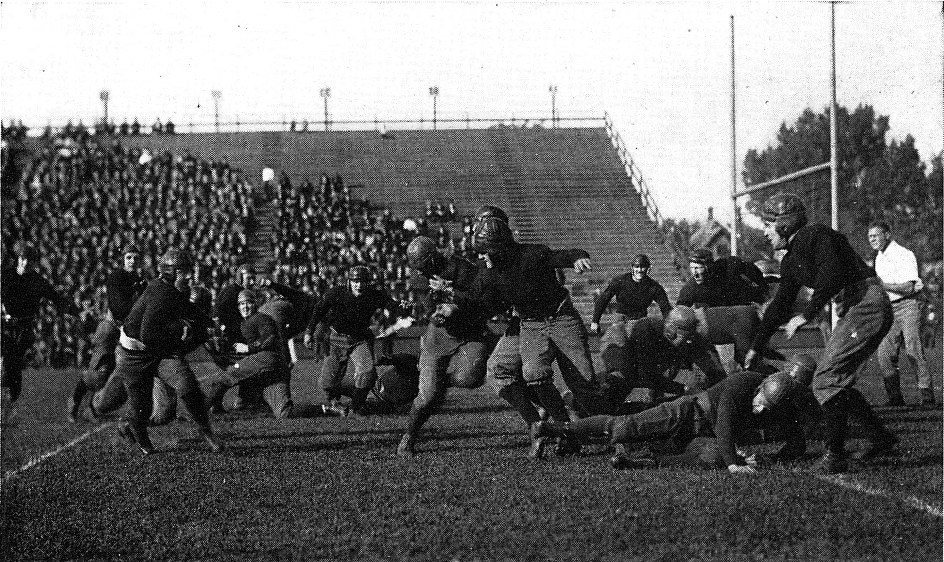
Usher running for a touchdown around end against Tulane, 1920.

Usher later played professional football in the National Football League (NFL) for the Buffalo All-Americans, Rock Island Independents, Green Bay Packers and Kansas City Blues for 3 seasons before retiring in 1924.
