= Milton Romney =

American football player (1899–1975)

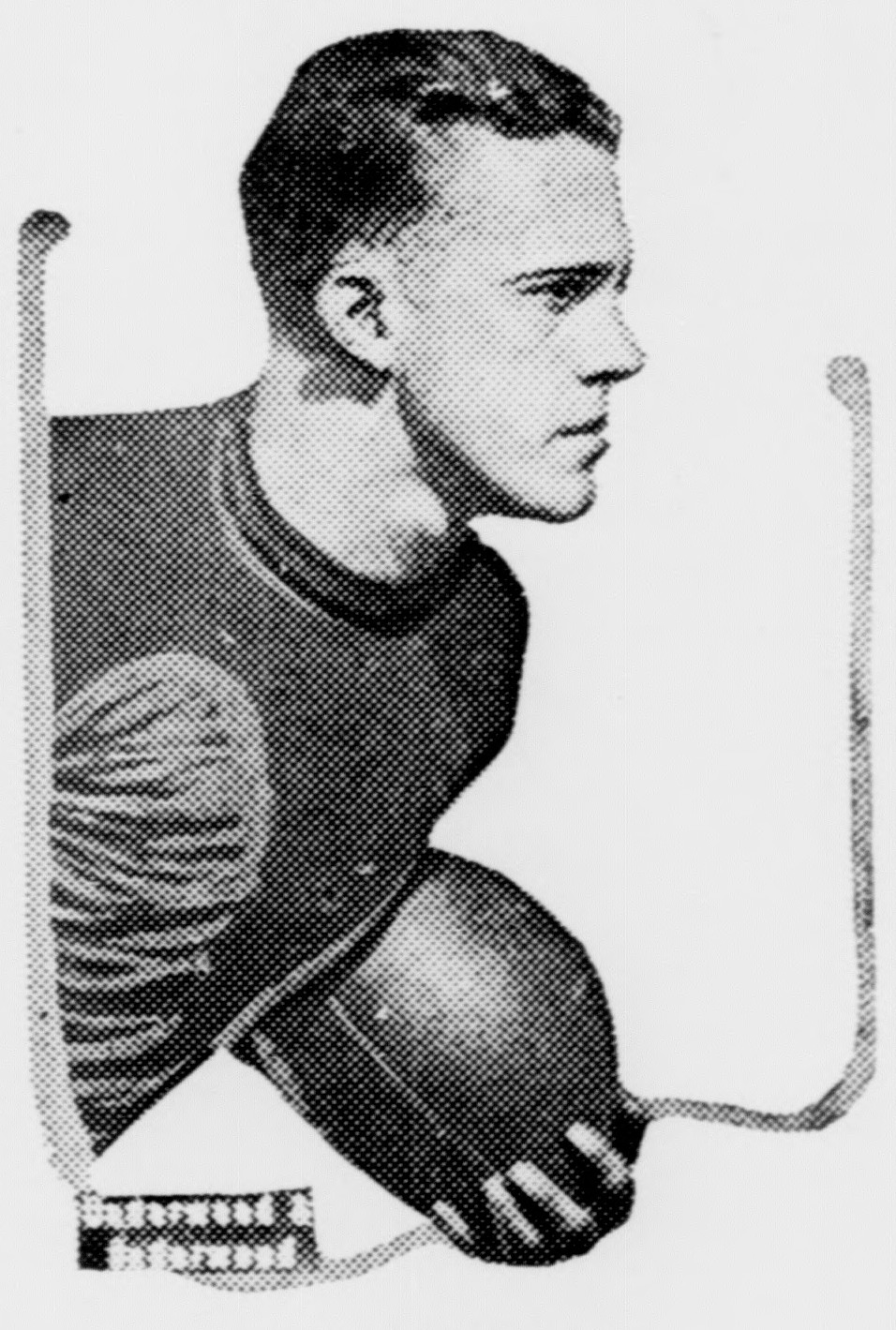
- Romney, c. 1921

No. 10
- Positions: Fullback, halfback, quarterback

Personal information
- Born: June 20, 1899; Salt Lake City, Utah, U.S.
- Died: November 10, 1975 (aged 76); Little Rock, Arkansas, U.S.

Career information
- College: Utah (1919); Chicago (1920–1922)

Career history
- Racine Legion (1923–1924); Chicago Bears (1925–1928)

Awards and highlights
- Second-team All-Big Ten (1921)

Career statistics
- Games played: 73
- Games started: 41
- Stats at Pro Football Reference

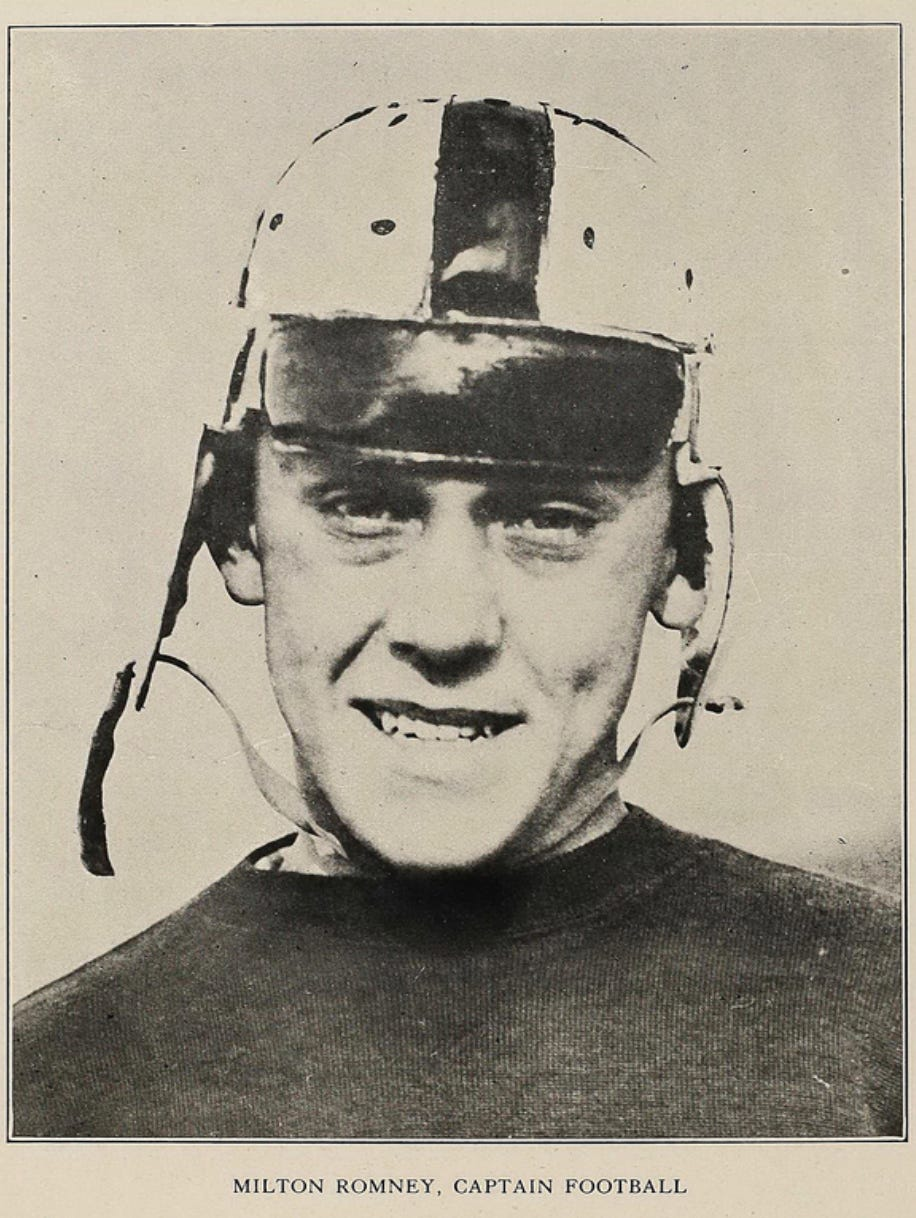
Utah’s 1919 captain, Milton Romney (Utah yearbook)

Milton Addas "Mitt" Romney (June 20, 1899 – November 10, 1975) was an American professional football player who played in the offensive backfield for the Racine Legion from 1923 to 1924 and was a quarterback for the Chicago Bears from 1925 to 1928. Romney played quarterback for the University of Chicago in the early 1920s when it had a winning varsity team, and was elected captain of the team in 1922. After graduating from the University of Chicago in 1923, Romney was head basketball coach at the University of Texas at Austin during the 1922–23 season. He coached the Longhorns to a record of 11–7.

Romney was born in Salt Lake City, Utah. He is the cousin of George W. Romney, father of Mitt Romney. Mitt Romney is his namesake and is a first cousin once removed. Romney died in Little Rock, Arkansas on November 10, 1975.

== Head coaching record ==
Record table
Season	Team	Overall	Conference	Standing	Postseason
Texas Longhorns (Southwest Conference) (1923)
1923	Texas	11–7	9–7	2nd	
Texas:		11–7 (.611)	9–7 (.563)		
Total:		11–7 (.611)			
