= Stevens Gould =

American football player (c. 1898–1961)

Wisconsin Badgers
- Positions: End, Halfback

Personal information
- Born: c. 1898; Oshkosh, Wisconsin, U.S.
- Died: August 8, 1961; Madison, Wisconsin, U.S.

Career information
- College: Wisconsin (1917, 1919−1921)

Awards and highlights
- First-team All-Big Ten (1921)

T. Stevens Gould (c. 1898 − August 8, 1961) was an American football player. He served as an aviator in the United States Navy during World War I. He played college football for the Wisconsin Badgers at the end and halfback positions in 1917 and 1919 to 1921. He was selected as a first-team player on the 1921 All-Big Ten Conference football team. He later became a member of the editorial staff of The Wisconsin State Journal. He died in 1961 at age 63.
