= Henry L. Williams =

American football player and coach (1869–1931)

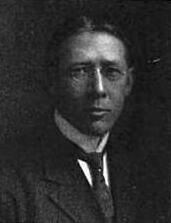

Biographical details
- Born: July 26, 1869; Hartford, Connecticut, U.S.
- Died: June 14, 1931 (aged 61); Minneapolis, Minnesota, U.S.

Playing career
- 1889–1890: Yale
- Position: Halfback

Coaching career (HC unless noted)
- 1891: Army
- 1892–1899: William Penn Charter (PA)
- 1900–1921: Minnesota

Head coaching record
- Overall: 141–34–12 (college)

Accomplishments and honors

Championships
- 1 national (1904); 8 Western (1900, 1903–1904, 1906, 1909–1911, 1915)
- College Football Hall of Fame; Inducted in 1951 (profile)

Henry Lane Williams (July 26, 1869 – June 14, 1931) was an American football player and coach. He served as the head football coach at the United States Military Academy in 1891 and the University of Minnesota from 1900 to 1921, compiling a career college football record of 141–34–12. Williams's Minnesota Golden Gophers teams won eight Western Conference—now known as the Big Ten Conference—titles and his 136 wins are the most of any coach in team history. He was inducted into the College Football Hall of Fame as a coach in 1951.

== Coaching career ==
After playing football at Yale University under head coach Walter Camp, where with Camp he co-invented the "tackle-back" formation, Williams began his coaching career at the United States Military Academy in 1891 while he was a teacher at Siglar Academy in Newburgh, New York. He then moved to Philadelphia where he enrolled at the University of Pennsylvania School of Medicine while he coached football and track at William Penn Charter School.

In 1900, Williams was hired as the head football coach at the University of Minnesota, where he invented the Minnesota shift. His Minnesota Golden Gophers were Big Ten Conference champions eight times (1900, 1903, 1904, 1906, 1909, 1910, 1911, 1915). Williams had a 136–33–11 record at Minnesota. His winning percentage (.786) is the highest of any Gopher football coach to date with the exception of Wallie Winter who went 6–0 in his only season 1893. In 1903, the Gophers went 14–0–1. Their lone tie came against Fielding H. Yost's Michigan Wolverines. After the contest, the Wolverines left behind their water jug at Northrop Field, which gave rise to the Little Brown Jug, one of the oldest and most famous college football trophies.

Williams died on June 14, 1931, at the Swedish Hospital in Minneapolis. He was buried in Lakewood Cemetery.

Williams was inducted into the College Football Hall of Fame with the inaugural class in 1951. Williams Arena, the home venue for Minnesota basketball, was renamed in his honor after a remodeling in the 1950s.

=== Legacy ===
Williams coaching tree includes:

1. Bernie Bierman
2. Gil Dobie
3. Clark Shaughnessy

== Head coaching record ==
=== College ===
Year	Team	Overall	Conference	Standing
Army Cadets (Independent) (1891)
1891	Army	5–1–1		
Army:		5–1–1		
Minnesota Golden Gophers (Western Conference / Big Ten Conference) (1900–1921)
1900	Minnesota	10–0–2	3–0–1	T–1st
1901	Minnesota	9–1–1	3–1	3rd
1902	Minnesota	9–2–1	3–1	3rd
1903	Minnesota	14–0–1	3–0–1	T–1st
1904	Minnesota	13–0	3–0	T–1st
1905	Minnesota	10–1	2–1	T–2nd
1906	Minnesota	4–1	2–0	T–1st
1907	Minnesota	2–2–1	0–1–1	5th
1908	Minnesota	3–2–1	0–2	T–6th
1909	Minnesota	6–1	3–0	1st
1910	Minnesota	6–1	2–0	T–1st
1911	Minnesota	6–0–1	3–0–1	1st
1912	Minnesota	4–3	2–2	T–3rd
1913	Minnesota	5–2	2–1	T–2nd
1914	Minnesota	6–1	3–1	2nd
1915	Minnesota	6–0–1	3–0–1	T–1st
1916	Minnesota	6–1	3–1	3rd
1917	Minnesota	4–1	3–1	2nd
1918	Minnesota	5–2–1	2–1	T–4th
1919	Minnesota	4–2–1	3–2	T–4th
1920	Minnesota	1–6	0–6	T–9th
1921	Minnesota	3–4	2–4	T–6th
Minnesota:		136–33–11	50–25–5	
Total:		141–34–12		
National championship Conference title Conference division title or championship game berth
