= Efton James =

American football player (1890–1918)

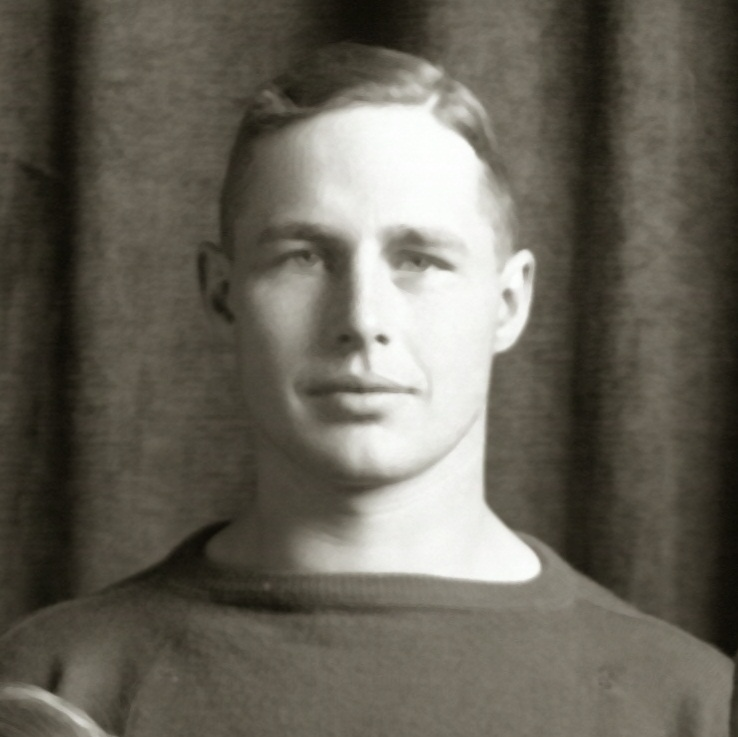
- Efton James cropped from 1913 Michigan team portrait

Profile
- Position: End

Personal information
- Born: September 1, 1890; Cass County, Michigan, U.S.
- Died: October 14, 1918 (age 28) near Sedan, France

Career information
- College: Michigan

Career history
- 1911: Adrian College
- 1912–1914: Michigan

Efton M. James (September 1, 1890 – October 14, 1918) was an American football player. He played end for Adrian College in 1911 and for the University of Michigan from 1912 to 1914.

James was born in Cass County, Michigan, in 1890, the son of Mr. and Mrs. Parker James. He listed his home town as Vandalia, Michigan. He attended the public schools in Cass County, but moved to Ann Arbor, Michigan, to attend Ann Arbor High School. James graduated from high school in 1911 and enrolled at Adrian College. where he became a star football player. After an outstanding season in 1911, he was elected captain of Adrian's football team for 1912. In December 1911, the Detroit Free Press called him "one of the sensations of the inter-collegiate this year" and "not only one of the best ends the college ever had but also one of the most popular athletes in school."

After the 1911 season, James transferred to the University of Michigan to play football under Michigan's head coach Fielding H. Yost. James's Adrian College teammate and "inseparable friend" John Maulbetsch followed James to Ann Arbor in 1913. James played for Yost's Michigan Wolverines football teams from 1912 to 1914.

James graduated from the University of Michigan in 1915. He moved to Detroit, Michigan, where he became employed by the R.H. Taylor real estate company.

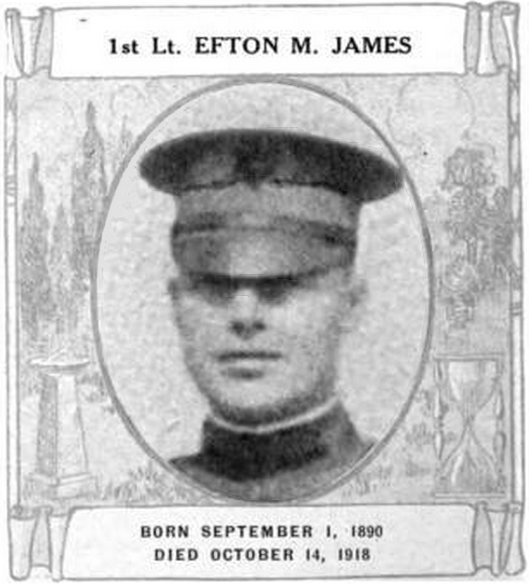
Efton James in military uniform

Following the United States' entry into World War I, James left his real estate job and entered the First Officers Training Camp at Fort Sheridan. He was commissioned as a second lieutenant and sailed for France in April 1918 as part of the 61st Infantry, Fifth Division. He was promoted to first lieutenant and placed in charge of the Stokes mortar platoon of the headquarters company until October 13, 1918. He then took charge of Company K. On October 14, 1918, while advancing near Sedan, France, in the Verdun sector, James was killed upon being struck by a shell fragment.

He was one of three former Michigan Wolverines football players to be killed while serving in World War I. The other two were Curtis Redden and Otto Carpell. In November 1921, a bronze memorial tablet was unveiled at Michigan's football stadium to honor the four Michigan football players killed in the war.
