= Guy Sundt =

American athlete, coach, and administrator (1898–1955)

Biographical details
- Born: February 18, 1898; Stoughton, Wisconsin, U.S.
- Died: October 25, 1955 (aged 57); Madison, Wisconsin, U.S.

Playing career

Football
- 1919–1921: Wisconsin
- Positions: Fullback, punter

Coaching career (HC unless noted)

Football
- 1922–1923: Ripon
- 1924–1948: Wisconsin (backfield)

Basketball
- 1922–1924: Ripon
- 1924–1929: Wisconsin (freshman)

Baseball
- 1925–1926: Wisconsin (freshman)

Track
- 1922–1924: Ripon
- 1924–1948: Wisconsin (assistant)
- 1948–1950: Wisconsin

Administrative career (AD unless noted)
- 1950–1955: Wisconsin

Head coaching record
- Overall: 4–8–2 (football)

Guy M. Sundt (February 18, 1898 – October 25, 1955) was an American athlete, coach, and college athletics administrator. He played football and basketball and ran track at the University of Wisconsin–Madison.

== Biography ==
Sundt attended the University of Wisconsin, where he was an All-American long jumper for the Wisconsin Badgers track and field team. He placed fourth in the long jump at the 1921 NCAA Track and Field Championships.

After graduating from Wisconsin in 1922, Sundt spent two years at Ripon College in Ripon, Wisconsin, where he served as athletic director and coached football, basketball, and track. He returned to Wisconsin in 1924 as freshman football and basketball coach and assistant track coach. From 1924 until 1948, Sundt coached the backfield on the varsity Wisconsin Badgers football team. From 1948 until 1950, he served as the head track coach for the Badgers before taking the job as athletic director at Wisconsin, a role he filled until his death in 1955.

== Head coaching record ==
=== Football ===
Year	Team	Overall	Conference	Standing	Bowl/playoffs
Ripon Crimson (Independent) (1922)
1922	Ripon	2–4–2			
Ripon Crimson (Midwest Conference) (1923)
1923	Ripon	2–4	0–2	T–7th	
Ripon:		4–8–2	0–2		
Total:		4–8–2			
