= Charles Redmon =

American athlete (1900–1939)

- Born: February 23, 1900; Peru, Indiana
- Died: April 6, 1939 (aged 39); Evanston, Illinois
- Known for: NCAA champion, hammer throw (1921)

Charles Marion Redmon (February 23, 1900 – April 6, 1939) was an American football and track and field athlete for the University of Chicago.

== Biography ==
Redmon was born in 1900 in Peru, Indiana. He was the son of a dentist, Dr. Charles E. Redmon. He graduated from Peru High School in 1918. He served as a private in the Army during World War I.

After the war, Redmon attended the University of Chicago where he competed for the school in track and field. He won the hammer throw competition at the first NCAA track and field championships in 1921 with a throw of 133 feet, 9-3/4 inches. He also won the hammer throw in every dual meet for the University of Chicago in 1921. In June 1921, he was selected as the captain of the University of Chicago track team. Redmon also played football for Amos Alonzo Stagg's Chicago Maroons football team as a guard.

Redmon was married to Mary Katherine Howell. He worked for four years with the Boulevard Bridge Bank and later for the Illinois Meat Company. He died of a sudden heart attack in 1939 at his home in Evanston, Illinois, at age 39. He was buried at Memorial Park Cemetery in Skokie, Illinois.

== See also ==
- 1921 NCAA Men's Track and Field Championships
