= Paul G. Goebel =

American football player (1901–1988)

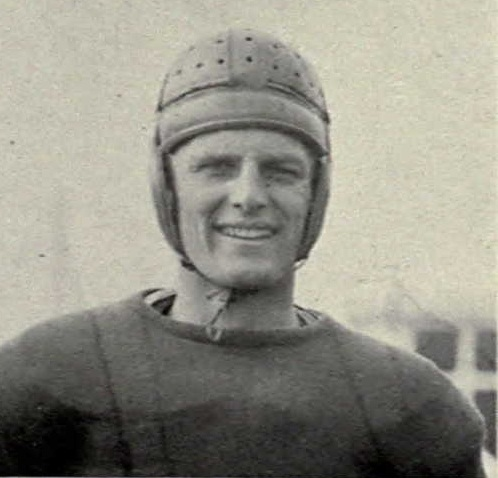
- Goebel in 1922

Profile
- Position: End

Personal information
- Born: May 28, 1901; Grand Rapids, Michigan, U.S.
- Died: January 26, 1988 (aged 86); Grand Rapids, Michigan, U.S.

Career information
- College: Michigan

Career history
- 1923–1925: Columbus Tigers
- 1926: New York Yankees

Awards and highlights
- 2× First-team All-Pro (1923, 1925); Second-team All-Pro (1924); 2× All-American (1921, 1922); First-team All-Big Ten (1922); Second-team All-Big Ten (1921)

Paul Gordon Goebel (May 28, 1901 – January 26, 1988) was an American football player who was an end for the University of Michigan Wolverines from 1920 to 1922. He was an All-American in 1921 and was the team's captain in 1922. He played professional football from 1923 to 1926 with the Columbus Tigers, Chicago Bears, and New York Yankees. He was named to the National Football League (NFL) All-Pro team in 1923 and 1924.

After his football career ended, he operated a sporting good store in Grand Rapids. He officiated football games for the Big Ten Conference for 16 years and also served in the U.S. Navy on an aircraft carrier in World War II. He was active in Republican Party politics in Grand Rapids, Michigan, and was one of the organizers of a reform movement to oust the city's political boss, Frank McKay. As an anti-McKay reform candidate, Goebel was three times elected mayor of Grand Rapids in the 1950s. He was later elected to the University of Michigan Board of Regents, where he served from 1962 to 1970.

Goebel also played an important role in the career of U.S. President Gerald R. Ford. Goebel was friends with Ford's mother and stepfather and recommended Ford to head football coach Harry Kipke at the University of Michigan. When Ford returned from World War II, Goebel urged him to run for U.S. Congress and was part of the original Ford-for-Congress committee. Goebel was later the chairman of a committee formed in 1960 to name Ford as the Republican Party's vice presidential candidate on the ticket with Richard Nixon.

== Football player at the University of Michigan ==
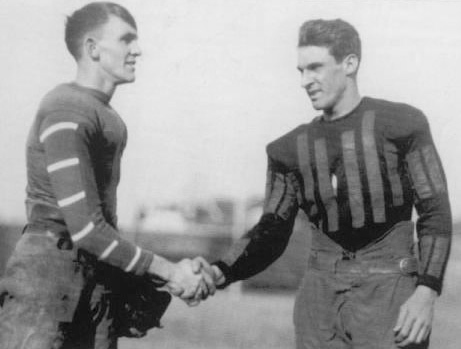
Goebel (left) and Jess Neely in 1922

Goebel enrolled at the University of Michigan in 1919. He studied engineering and received his degree in 1923. While at Michigan, he played football under head coach Fielding H. Yost. He played at the end where he developed a reputation as one of the country's best forward pass receivers and as a tenacious defensive player. At 6-feet, 3-inches, Goebel was a tall player in his era. He started seven games in each of the 1920 and 1921 seasons at right end for the Wolverines, and was limited due to injury to five games in 1922. In 1921, he was chosen as an All-American and was voted the captain of the 1922 team. Goebel also excelled as an honor student in the university's engineering school. Goebel also earned the Big Ten Conference Medal of Honor for proficiency in academics and athletics.

=== Goebel's steel knee brace ===
Prior to the 1922 season, Goebel "threw out his knee" and was fitted with a steel hinge – an early version of a knee brace. However, the steel contraption required oiling and overheated when the oil dried, thus limiting Goebel's ability to play a complete game in 1922. One 1922 newspaper article described Goebel's knee brace this way: "To enable Goebel to play, the Michigan trainers devised a steel brace – a hinge. This apparatus attached above and below the knee gave Goebel fairly good leg action because of the hinge. Before each game, Goebel liberally oiled the hinge to get free action because of the hinge." Goebel's playing time was limited because "the constant action would dry the oil and then the steel would become so hot that Goebel could not continue playing." During the 1922 game against Illinois, Goebel's skin was burned by the steel.

=== Dedication Day at Ohio Stadium ===
Despite the limitations of the knee brace, Goebel led the Wolverines to victory in the first game played at Ohio Stadium. The official "Dedication Day" for the stadium was October 21, 1922, and the opponent was Michigan. Ohio State fans recalled for years afterward how Goebel and his teammate Harry Kipke managed to turn Dedication Day sour for the Buckeyes. Michigan shut out the Buckeyes, 19–0, with Goebel and Kipke scoring all the points. In the first period, Goebel blocked a punt and then kicked a long field goal from the 30-yard line for the game's first points. He also penetrated into the Ohio State backfield in the second quarter to recover a fumble. As the game wore on, the Buckeyes "seemed to realize (Goebel's) importance in the Michigan lineup because he was forced to take plenty of punishment." Football writer Billy Evans described Goebel's performance against Ohio State this way:

No end in recent years has played a greater game (than) that which Goebel put up against Ohio State. For three periods Goebel was the mainspring of the Michigan eleven. He seemed to be in every play. It was always Goebel who was gumming things up for State. No man could go through an entire game at the speed with which Goebel played in the first three quarters. It was beyond the power of any human being. With a few minutes to play in the third period the big fellow practically collapsed. Even when three or four of his teammates were carrying him off the field the old spirit was still there. He tried to induce his teammates that he was able to play, and tried to break away from their grasp, but the punch was gone and he was forced to give way as the big crowd cheered him to the echo. If any one man made possible the defeat of State by Michigan, it was Captain Paul Goebel.

The rotunda at Ohio Stadium is painted with maize flowers on a blue background due to the outcome of the 1922 dedication game against, an enduring tribute to Goebel's performance that day. Another writer summed up Goebel's 1922 season: "Captain Paul Goebel of Michigan has commanded no little attention this season. He is fast and furious. His particular forte lies in his ability to not only plunge in and break up the interference of the opposing team, but after so doing, nail the man with the ball and down him in his tracks."

=== Tradition of the #1 jersey at Michigan ===
Goebel was particularly adept as a pass receiver. A 1923 wire service report in the Capital Times noted that Goebel was "considered one of the best ends in the country and his work on receiving forward passes hasn't been excelled on the gridiron." In what would become a tradition at Michigan 60 years later, Goebel was the first All-American receiver at Michigan to wear the #1 jersey. Others to follow that tradition are Anthony Carter, Derrick Alexander, David Terrell, and Braylon Edwards.

=== Death of Bernard Kirk ===
Across the field from right end Goebel, Bernard Kirk played left end for the Wolverines in 1921 and 1922. Kirk was a talented player who was set to graduate with Goebel in 1923. However, Kirk was fatally injured in an automobile accident on December 17, 1922, and died six days later. Goebel was a pall-bearer along with Harry Kipke, Frank Steketee, and other Michigan football players at Kirk's funeral in Ypsilanti, Michigan. Kirk had been a popular figure, and his funeral was covered widely in the national press, with Michigan Governor Alex Groesbeck, U-M President Marion LeRoy Burton, and the coaches of the Big Ten Conference football teams all in attendance.

Goebel also served years later as a pall bearer at the funeral of his coach, Fielding H. Yost, in August 1946.

== Professional football ==
In February 1923, Goebel refused an offer to become the head football coach at Wichita State University (then known as Fairmount College), saying he planned to enter the engineering profession after graduation. Instead, Goebel opted to play professional football. He played professional football for the Columbus Tigers from 1923 to 1925, the Chicago Bears in 1925, and the New York Yankees (the football team) in 1926. In his first year in the NFL, Goebel played in all ten of the team's games for the Columbus Tigers and was named to the All-Pro Team. He threw one touchdown pass and caught another. He was credited with eight points scored including two extra points.

In 1924, Goebel was again selected as an All-Pro player with the Tigers, playing in ten games, making two touchdown receptions, and returning a fumble for a touchdown. In all, he was credited with three touchdowns and 18 points in 1924. While playing end for the Columbus Tigers in 1924, Goebel was involved in one of the oddest plays in NFL history. Goebel was the intended receiver of a forward pass, but the ball popped out of his arms and was snatched out of the air by Oscar Knop of the Chicago Bears. Knop began running for the goal line with the ball, but he was running the wrong way toward a safety. After running 30 yards, Knop was caught from behind and tackled by his teammate Ed Healey on the four-yard line.

In 1926, Goebel played for the Yankees alongside Red Grange. After the close of the 1926 football season, he went to Los Angeles where he took a minor role in Grange's latest film. In May 1927, Goebel announced his retirement from professional football. He said he would devote his time to the sporting goods store he operated in Grand Rapids. Goebel had been playing professional football every season since he finished at Michigan.

== Football official and sporting good businessman ==
After retiring from professional football, Goebel worked in his sporting good business in Grand Rapids, and also worked during football season as a game official for the Big Ten Conference. For 16 years between 1935 and 1952, he was a Big Ten football official. He also officiated in Rose Bowl, Notre Dame, and Army-Navy games.

Goebel played a role in a famous Ohio State-Illinois game on November 13, 1943. The game was Paul Brown's last game as coach of the Buckeyes. With the score tied 26–26, Ohio State threw an incomplete forward pass into the end zone as the gun sounded. The game appeared to have ended in a tie, the teams left the field, and the stands emptied. However, Ohio State assistant coach Ernie Godfrey had noticed Goebel, who was the head linesman, drop a handkerchief to signal a penalty. On hearing the gun sound, Goebel had picked up the handkerchief and put it back in his back pocket. Godfrey confronted Goebel, who conceded that Illinois was offsides. Twenty minutes later, the teams came back onto the field and the Buckeyes kicked a 33-yard field goal to give Coach Brown a 29–26 win in his final game.

During World War II, Goebel served in the U.S. Navy as Lieutenant Commander on an aircraft carrier. His final game as an official was the 1952 Rose Bowl between Illinois and Stanford, in which he was the head linesman.

Goebel was also a fisherman, winning the title of Trout King at the National Trout Festival in 1949.

== Relationship with Gerald R. Ford ==
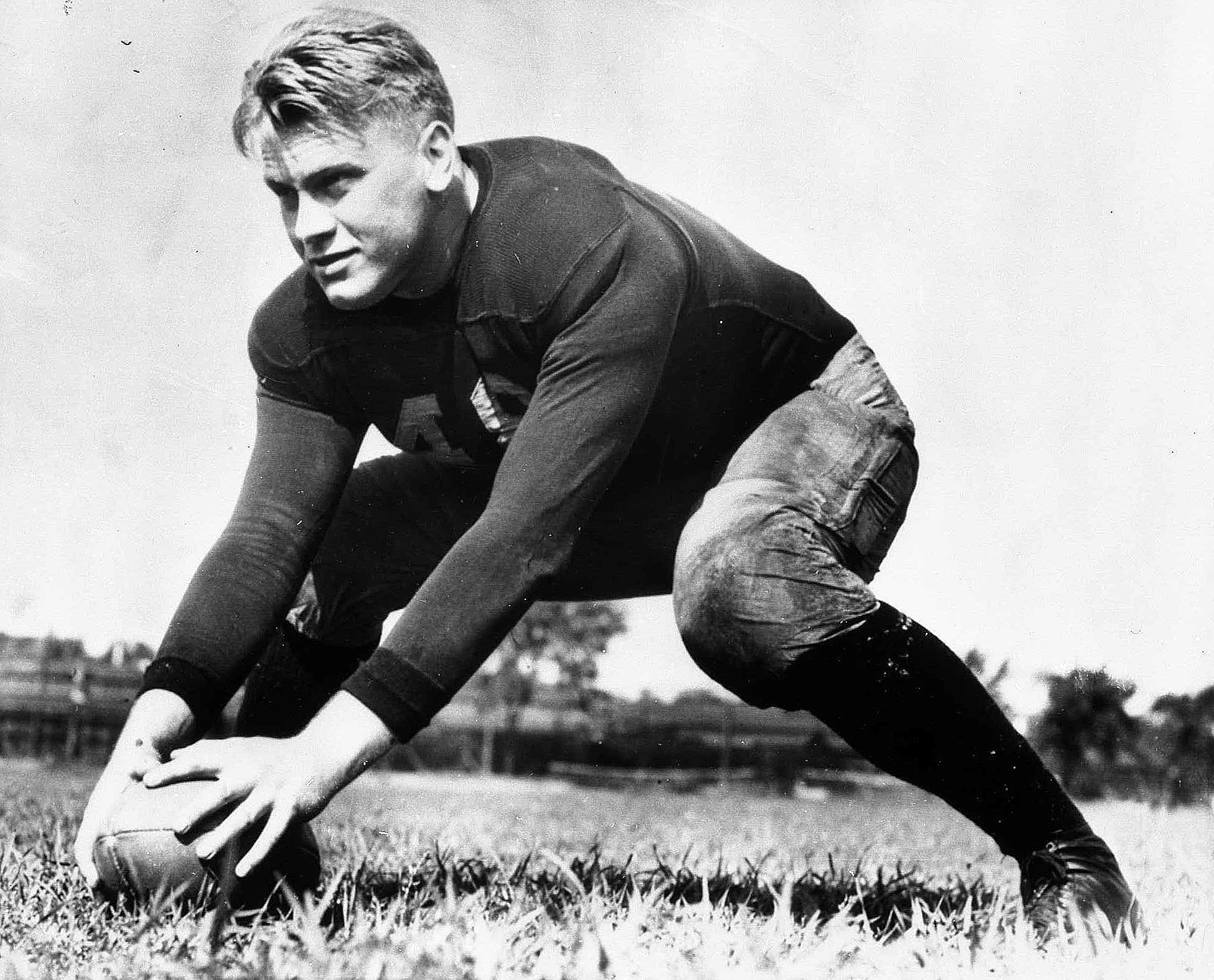
Goebel played a key role in the football and political career of Gerald Ford, pictured in 1933 in Ann Arbor

Goebel was a friend of Gerald R. Ford's mother and stepfather in Grand Rapids. Goebel played an important role in guiding Ford to the University of Michigan. When Ford graduated from Grand Rapids South High School, Goebel recognized Ford's ability as a football player and recommended him to his former teammate Harry Kipke, who had taken over as Michigan's head football coach. Kipke recruited Ford, who became Michigan's Most Valuable Player in 1934.

In 1940, Goebel was part of a citizen's group in Grand Rapids seeking to overthrow Grand Rapids' political boss, Frank McKay. McKay had dismissed Ford's political interest in 1940, and this led to a long political alliance between Goebel and Ford. Ford went to work with Goebel as part of the anti-McKay citizen's group. Together, they organized the "Home Front," the purpose of which was to throw out Boss McKay. Ford was elected president of the organization, his first experience in political organizing.

Ford and Goebel both served in the U.S. Navy during World War II, and after the war, Ford urged Goebel to run for Congress against the incumbent, an isolationist named Barney Jonkman. Goebel declined to run, but suggested to Ford that, "if you think he ought to be beaten, why don't you run?" Ford did run for Congress in 1948, and Goebel was one of his close circle of early supporters, the original Ford-for-Congress group. Ford won the election and won re-election for twelve more terms. In 1960, Goebel was a leader in the movement to nominate Ford as the vice presidential candidate on the ticket with Richard Nixon, serving as Chairman of the "Ford for Vice President Committee" at the Republican National Convention in Chicago.

When Goebel's son, Paul G. Goebel Jr., ran for Ford's congressional seat in 1974, then President Ford returned to Grand Rapids to campaign for Goebel's son. Ford delivered a speech at Calvin College in Grand Rapids the week before the election in which he said: "Paul Goebel I have known since he was just a lad. His dad knew me when I was back at South High—an inspired if not very competent football player. But I have known the Goebel family a long time, and they are strong and they are tall, and they are the kind of people who are dedicated to public service. Paul, Jr.'s, father was; Paul, Jr., himself is. And I have seen nothing but the finest in that family, and young Paul, he epitomizes all the great characteristics of that family."

== Political career ==
=== Mayor of Grand Rapids ===
Goebel himself ran for office in 1950. He ran for mayor of Grand Rapids as part of the same anti-McKay reform movement that brought Gerald Ford to office. According to one newspaper account, Goebel "spearheaded a reform movement which brought him into office in 1950," ousting incumbent George W. Welsh, who had been elected mayor five times and also served as the state's lieutenant governor. At the time, Goebel was the partner in a sporting goods store and was described in the press as tall and rangy, a candidate "who looks like a blond Abraham Lincoln without a beard." Goebel was re-elected in 1952 for a second two-year term. In October 1953, Goebel announced he would not run for a third term, saying he had no further political ambitions and would devote his time to his family and business. Within a short time, however, he changed his mind and ran for a third term with the support of the reformist Citizens Action Group. In February 1954, Goebel received the most votes of any candidate in his third race for mayor (19,564 for Goebel to 10,831 for George Veldman), but he failed to secure a majority, and a runoff was held. Veldman defeated Goebel in the runoff by a margin of 203 votes. Goebel requested a recount, but he was unsuccessful. In 1956, he won re-election as mayor of Grand Rapids and served a final term from 1956 to 1958. In 1957, Goebel was included in published lists of potential candidates to run as the Republican candidate for governor. In January 1958, Goebel announced that he would not seek re-election as mayor. He said he had no plans to seek another political office.

=== University of Michigan Board of Regents ===
In 1962, Goebel returned to politics, winning a seat on the Board of Regents of the University of Michigan, where he served from 1962 to 1970. In 1968, the Regents voted to eliminate curfews for all women students in residence halls and to allow each housing unit to set its own visitation hours. Goebel was the sole dissenter, saying: "If my judgment is proved wrong, no one will be happier than I." In July 1970, Goebel announced that he would retire from the Regents at the end of his term on December 31, 1970. At age 69, he said the expected strain of another campaign influenced his decision.

=== Other civic and political roles ===
Through the 1950s and 1960s, Goebel also occupied himself with other civic and political projects, including serving as a member of the YMCA International World Service Committee in the 1960s, representing Governor George Romney and the State of Michigan at the 1965 Rose Bowl game, acting as chairman of the national committee of the University of Michigan in the mid-1960s to raise $55 million, acting as a delegate to Republican National Convention in 1956 and a delegate to Michigan state constitutional convention from 1961 to 1962, and serving as a member of Michigan Republican State Central Committee in 1969. He was also a member of the State of Michigan Higher Education Assistance Authority, Chairman of the State of Michigan Board of Ethics, Director of the U-M National Alumni Association and President of the Varsity "M" Club. Goebel was a Congregationalist and a member of the Freemasons, the Rotary Club, and Tau Beta Pi.

== Family ==
Goebel's wife, Margaret Goebel, was a graduate nurse, a columnist for a Grand Rapids newspaper, and Chairman of Governor George Romney's Commission on the Status of Women. She also worked with the Grand Rapids Red Cross, the Council on World Affairs, the Urban League and was appointed by President Kennedy in 1962 to the Civil Defense Advisory Council. Goebel and his wife had two children. Their son Paul G. Goebel Jr. was an aide to Rep. Gerald R. Ford and Vice President Richard M. Nixon. Paul Gobel Jr. also operated an insurance business in Grand Rapids known as the Paul Goebel group.

== Honors and accolades ==
Goebel's honors over the years include the following:

- Selected as an All-American in 1921.
- Voted captain of the 1922 Michigan Wolverines football team.
- Named to the NFL "All-Pro" team in 1923 and 1924.
- In 1968, several donors made gifts to the University of Michigan College of Engineering to establish an endowed chair for the Paul G. Goebel Professor of Engineering. The gifts came from donors who sought to honor Goebel for his contributions to the university. In April 1993, Yoram Koren was named as the Goebel Professor of Engineering.
- In 1971, Goebel was given the Distinguished Alumni Service Award. The award, which is presented annually, recognizes alumni who have distinguished themselves "by reason of services performed on behalf of the University of Michigan, or in connection with its organized alumni activities." The Distinguished Alumni Service Award is the highest honor the Alumni Association can bestow upon an alumna/us on behalf of the university.
- Inducted into Grand Rapids Sports Hall of Fame in 1971.
- In 1984, Goebel was the fourth recipient of the Ufer Award. Since 1981, the Ufer Award has been presented each year to a Letterwinners "M" Club member in recognition for his or her outstanding service to the University of Michigan Athletic Program.
- Inducted into the University of Michigan Hall of Honor in 1981. Only seven football players (Bennie Oosterbaan, Gerald Ford, Tom Harmon, Willie Heston, Germany Schulz, Ron Kramer, and Benny Friedman) were inducted into the Hall of Honor before Goebel.
- The U-M Club of Grand Rapids each year awards the Paul G. Goebel Sr. Distinguished Alumni in Athletic Awards. Past recipients include Julius Franks.

== See also ==
- 1922 College Football All-America Team – Official list of the best college football players of 1922
- Board of Regents of the University of Michigan – Governing body of the University of Michigan
- List of mayors of Grand Rapids, Michigan
- List of Michigan Wolverines football All-Americans
- University of Michigan Athletic Hall of Honor

Political offices
Preceded by Stanley J. Davis	Mayor of Grand Rapids, Michigan; 1950–1954	Succeeded by George Veldman
Preceded by George Veldman	Mayor of Grand Rapids, Michigan; 1956–1958	Succeeded by Stanley J. Davis
