= 1922 Michigan Wolverines football team =

American college football season

1922 Michigan Wolverines football
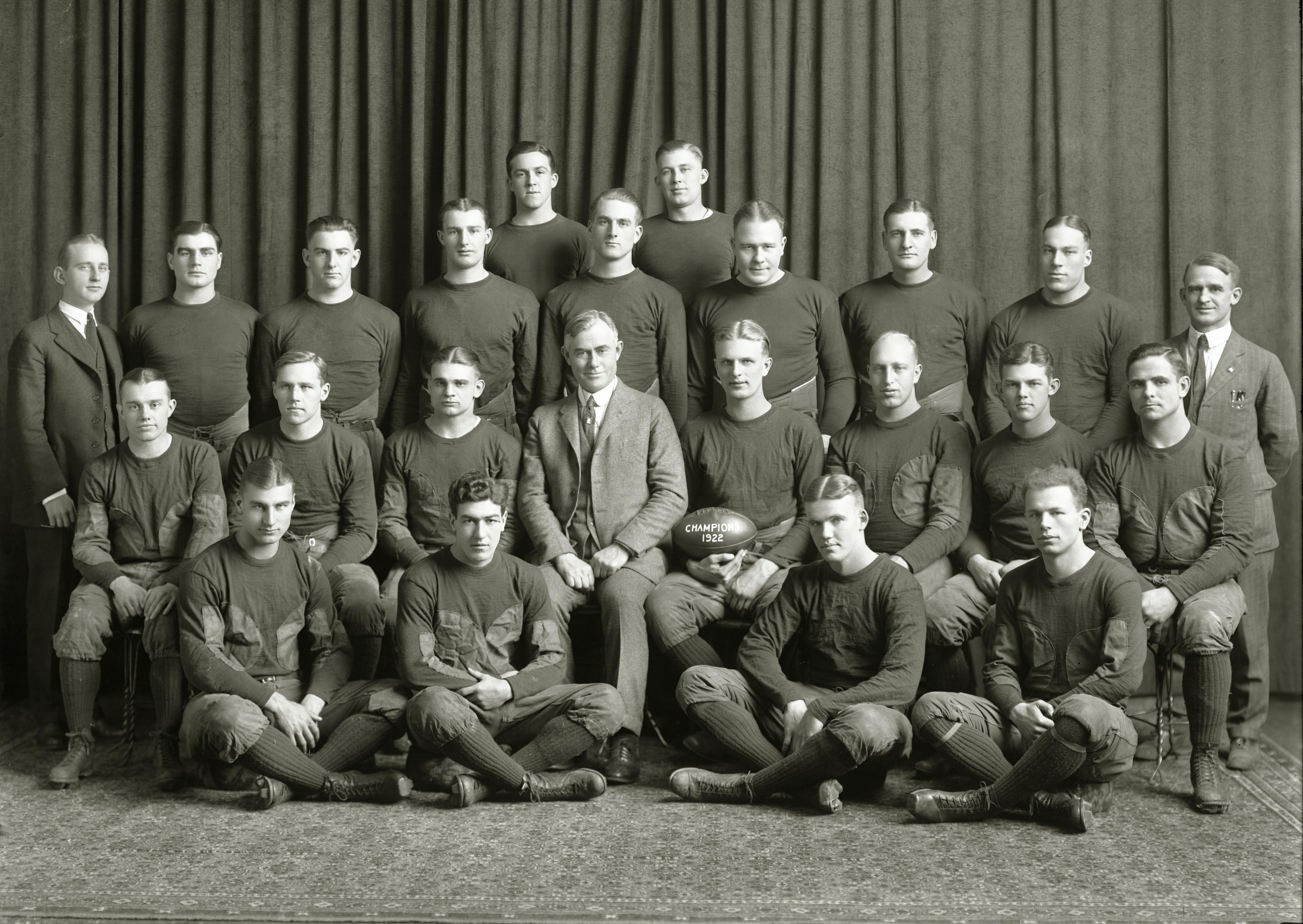

Big Ten co-champion
- Conference: Big Ten Conference
- Record: 6–0–1 (4–0 Big Ten)
- Head coach: Fielding H. Yost (22nd season)
- Captain: Paul G. Goebel
- Home stadium: Ferry Field

Uniform
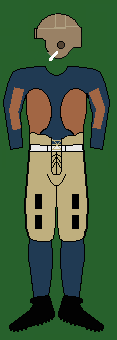

1922 Big Ten Conference football standings
	Conf.					Overall
Team	W		L		T	W		L		T
Iowa +	5	–	0	–	0	7	–	0	–	0
Michigan +	4	–	0	–	0	6	–	0	–	1
Chicago +	4	–	0	–	1	5	–	1	–	1
Wisconsin	2	–	2	–	1	4	–	2	–	1
Minnesota	2	–	3	–	1	3	–	3	–	1
Illinois	2	–	4	–	0	2	–	5	–	0
Northwestern	1	–	3	–	1	3	–	3	–	1
Ohio State	1	–	4	–	0	3	–	4	–	0
Indiana	0	–	2	–	1	1	–	4	–	2
Purdue	0	–	3	–	1	1	–	5	–	1
+ – Conference co-champions

The 1922 Michigan Wolverines football team represented the University of Michigan in the 1922 Big Ten Conference football season. In Fielding H. Yost's 22nd season as head coach, Michigan compiled a record of 6–0–1 (4–0 in Big Ten Conference games), outscored opponents 183–13, and tied with Iowa for the Big Ten championship. On defense, the team did not allow its opponents to score a point in the first five games of the season, and its scoring defense of 1.85 points per game is among the lowest in Michigan football history.

Highlights of the 1922 season included participation in dedication games for Vanderbilt University's Dudley Field, the first large athletic stadium in the South, and Ohio State University's Ohio Stadium. In the latter, the Wolverines shut out the Buckeyes, 19–0.

Halfback Harry Kipke led the team in scoring with 48 points in six games, handled punting responsibilities, and was also one of the team's best defensive players. Kipke was a consensus All-American, receiving first-team honors from Walter Camp, Athletic world, Walter Eckersall, Norman E. Brown, and Lawrence Perry. Team captain and right end Paul Goebel was also selected as a first-team All-American by Athletic world magazine based on polling of 214 coaches. Left end Bernard Kirk, who received first-team All-American honors from Eckersall, died of meningitis in December 1922 after sustaining a brain injury in an automobile crash.

== Schedule ==
Date	Time	Opponent	Site	Result	Attendance
October 7		Case*	Ferry Field; Ann Arbor, MI	W 48–0	10,000
October 14	2:15 p.m.	at Vanderbilt*	Dudley Field; Nashville, TN	T 0–0	20,000
October 21		at Ohio State	Ohio Stadium; Columbus, OH (rivalry)	W 19–0	71,000
October 28		Illinois	Ferry Field; Ann Arbor, MI (rivalry)	W 24–0	41,000
November 4		Michigan Agricultural*	Ferry Field; Ann Arbor, MI (rivalry)	W 63–0	25,000–42,000
November 18		Wisconsin^{†}	Ferry Field; Ann Arbor, MI	W 13–6	40,000
November 25		at Minnesota	Northrop Field; Minneapolis, MN (Little Brown Jug)	W 16–7	20,000
*Non-conference game; ^{†}Homecoming; All times are in Eastern time

== Preseason ==
Months before the start of the 1922 season, reports circulated that Fielding H. Yost intended to resign as Michigan's head football coach. He had served in that capacity since 1901 and had taken on additional responsibilities as the university's athletic director in 1921. In late February 1922, Yost denied the reports and said, "I have just begun my real work at Michigan, and I am not considering resigning."

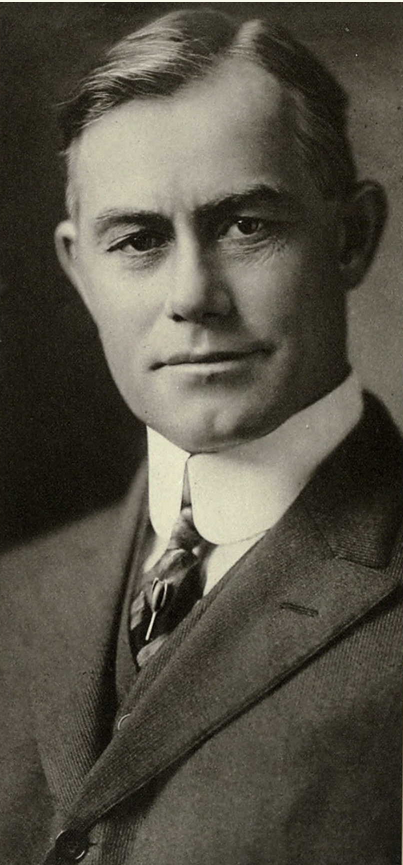
Fielding H. Yost

The months before the 1922 football season also brought change to athletic administration in the Big Ten Conference. The member schools created a new position for a commissioner of athletics and appointed John L. Griffith to the post. In August 1922, Yost, who was a member of the committee that chose Griffith, rejected suggestions that Griffith's appointment was an indication that there were compliance problems that needed to be corrected. Rather, Yost described the appointment as a "progressive move" toward solving future problems. Yost noted, "At least ninety-five percent of the men are good, perhaps five percent are bad, yet we hear more about the five percent who go wrong than the much greater number who play the game on the square."

Several key players from the 1921 team were lost to graduation. These included halfback Eddie Usher, who played for the Green Bay Packers in 1922, and fullback Frank Steketee, who had been a first-team All-American as a freshman in 1918. Despite the loss of Usher and Steketee, the 1922 backfield was promising with Irwin Uteritz, Harry Kipke, Franklin Cappon, and Doug Roby all returning from the 1921 team. Michigan's biggest weakness going into the 1922 season was the center of its line. All-American center Ernie Vick graduated and joined the St. Louis Cardinals baseball team in June 1922. Also gone were starting right guard, Hugh Wilson, and starting left guard, "Duke" Dunne. The 1923 Michiganensian summed up the challenges facing the 1922 team, "When the football season of 1922 opened, Coach Yost was confronted with two big problems, to build a line strong enough to withstand the onslaught of opposing backs and to beat Ohio State."

== Season summary ==
=== Week 1: Case ===
Week 1: Case at Michigan

Team	1	2	3	4	Total
Case	0	0	0	0	0
• Michigan	0	21	13	14	48

- Date: October 7, 1922
- Location: Ferry Field
  Ann Arbor, Michigan
- Game attendance: 10,000
- Referee: W. Bechtel (Wittenberg)

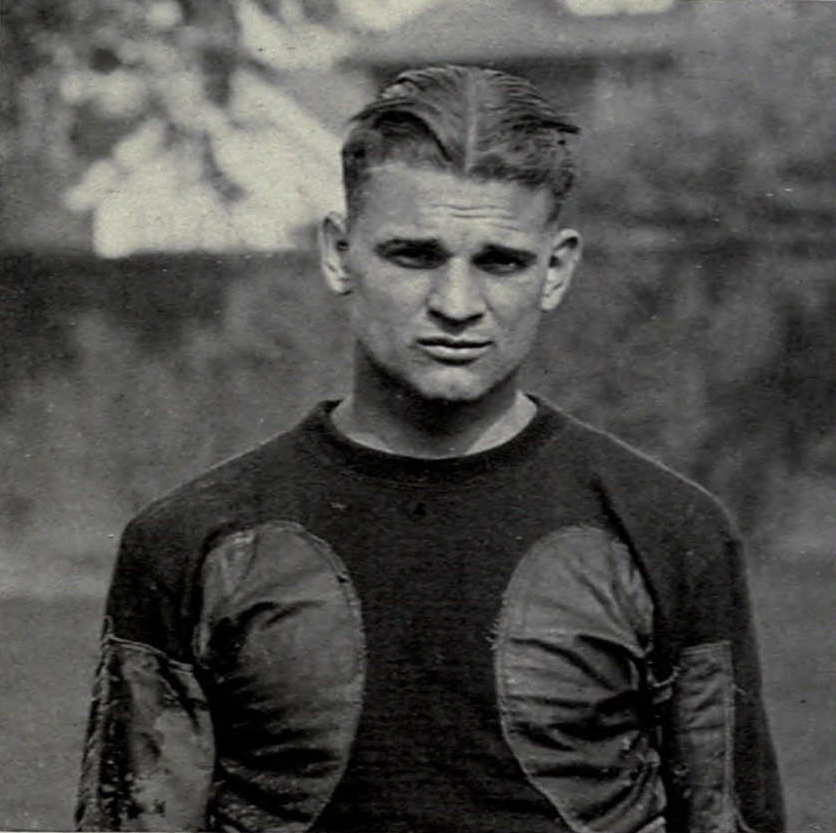
All-American Harry Kipke

Michigan opened the season on October 7, 1922, with a 48–0 victory over the "Scientists" from Case Scientific School. (Michigan opened its season with a home game against Case 16 times between 1902 and 1923.) Facing an easy opponent in Case, head coach Fielding H. Yost opted to spend the day watching the Ohio State game in Columbus, Ohio. Yost was accompanied in Columbus by team captain Paul Goebel and starting quarterback Irwin Uteritz. Two of Yost's assistants also spent the day on scouting missions, with George Little watching the Michigan Aggies and A. J. Sturzenegger watching Vanderbilt. Second-year assistant Tad Wieman was left in Ann Arbor as the game-day coach against Case.

The game was played in drizzling rain with a ball that was described as being "as slippery as the well-known greased pig." The first quarter was scoreless, as Michigan played defensive football, punting on first and second downs. Harry Kipke attempted a drop-kick for a field goal late in the first quarter, but the kick fell short. In the second quarter, Kipke ran 26 yards around right end for the first touchdown. On the next drive, Doug Roby scored Michigan's second touchdown on a 37-yard run, "arming off three tacklers and outrunning three others." Michigan's next possession began with a 43-yard kickoff return by Kipke and ended with a 15-yard touchdown run by Roby around the right end. Ray Knode drop-kicked all three extra points in the first half, and Michigan led at halftime, 21–0.

On Michigan's first play from scrimmage in the second half, Herb Steger took the ball at midfield and ran the length of the field for a touchdown. The Detroit Free Press described Steger "cleverly dodging, twisting, and straight arming" through half of the Case team and called it "the most sensational run of the contest." Steger place-kicked for the extra point after his touchdown. Later in the third period, Franklin Cappon intercepted a pass (his second interception in the quarter) and returned it 47 yards for a touchdown. Knode missed the extra point, and Michigan led, 34–0, at the end of the third quarter.

In the fourth quarter, Michigan scored twice. The Wolverines' sixth touchdown came on a 30-yard run through left tackle by Kipke, and the final touchdown was scored by Roby on a 12-yard run around right end. Knode kicked both of the extra points in the fourth quarter. Playing with an inexperienced line, Michigan was penalized several times for offside and holding. Despite the penalties, the Detroit Free Press praised Ed VanDerVoort for opening holes on offense and being immovable on defense, Jack Blott, who was "always under the plays" on defense, and Eddie Johns, who played with only one day's practice. Michigan's 48 points were scored by Roby (18), Kipke (12), Steger (7), Cappon (6), and Knode (5).

Michigan's starting lineup against Case was Kirk (left end), Blahnick (left tackle), Rosatti (left guard), Blott (center), Johns (right guard), VanDervoort (right tackle), Neisch (right end), Knode (quarterback), Roby (left halfback), Kipke (right halfback), and Cappon (fullback).

=== Week 2: at Vanderbilt ===
Week 2: Michigan at Vanderbilt

Team	1	2	3	4	Total
Michigan	0	0	0	0	0
Vanderbilt	0	0	0	0	0

- Date: October 14, 1922
- Location: Dudley Field
  Nashville, Tennessee
- Game attendance: 16,000
- Referee: Horatio B. Hackett

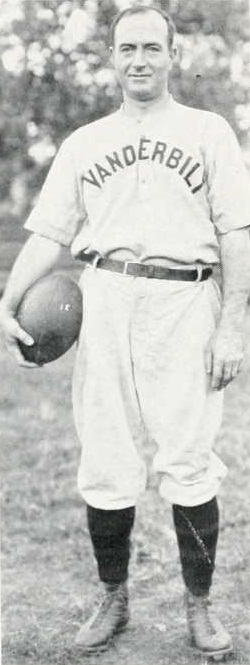
Vanderbilt coach Dan McGugin was Yost's brother-in-law.

For its second game, Michigan traveled to Nashville, Tennessee to play Vanderbilt. The game matched Michigan head coach Fielding H. Yost against his former player and brother-in-law Dan McGugin. Owing to the relationship between Yost and McGugin, the two teams played nine times between 1905 and 1923, with Michigan winning eight times. The 1922 game was also the official dedication game for Vanderbilt's new stadium, Dudley Field, the first large athletic stadium in the South.

The team left Ann Arbor for Nashville at midday on Thursday, October 12, accompanied by Coach Yost and the team's trainers Archie Hahn and Billy Fallon. Sam Greene, who became one of the leading sports writers in Detroit over the next 40 years, covered the trip. He reported that, shortly after arriving on Friday morning, the team was taken by friends on an automobile trip to The Hermitage, the plantation that had been owned by Andrew Jackson. In the afternoon, the team conducted "a brief limbering drill" at Vanderbilt's new field. In his pre-game report, Green expressed concern that, despite assistant coach Sturzenegger's scouting report, the team was overconfident:

"The Michigan boys are confident that they will win. Perhaps they are a trifle too confident. It can not be denied that the Wolverines are thinking more of the first conference game next Saturday with Ohio State than they are of the impending tussle with the southern squad. The feeling is too general among the players that this is more or less of a pre-season game."

Further supporting Greene's position that overconfidence may have led the Wolverines to look past Vanderbilt, The New York Times reported that, five days before the Vanderbilt game, Coach Yost had already begun "pointing the Wolverines for their tussle two weeks hence with the Buckeyes." Michigan also lost the services of its most experienced lineman, Eddie Johns. Johns had been on academic probation, and it was discovered that his probation had not been lifted when he played against Case. Accordingly, he was not permitted to travel with the team to Nashville.

Elaborate dedication festivities preceded the game. Michigan players participated in a "monster parade" through the streets of Nashville. Cornelius Vanderbilt IV traveled from New York to participate, and Tennessee Governor Alf Taylor spoke at midfield, welcoming the Michigan team. Coach Yost also spoke briefly, and three airplanes flew overhead during the flag-raising, one of them dropping a specially decorated football onto the field.

In the first quarter, Michigan drove the ball to Vanderbilt's five-yard line, but the Vanderbilt defense held. After that, Michigan had difficulty moving the ball. When the first half ended, the Vanderbilt fans cheered wildly that the Commodores had held the Wolverines scoreless. In the second half, Michigan drove to the Vanderbilt 25-yard line, but the Commodores held again. Field goal attempts by Jack Blott and Paul Goebel failed, and the game ended in a scoreless tie. Michigan converted six first downs in the game, while Vanderbilt converted only once. Michigan totaled 122 yards from scrimmage, while holding the Commodores to only 21 yards from scrimmage.

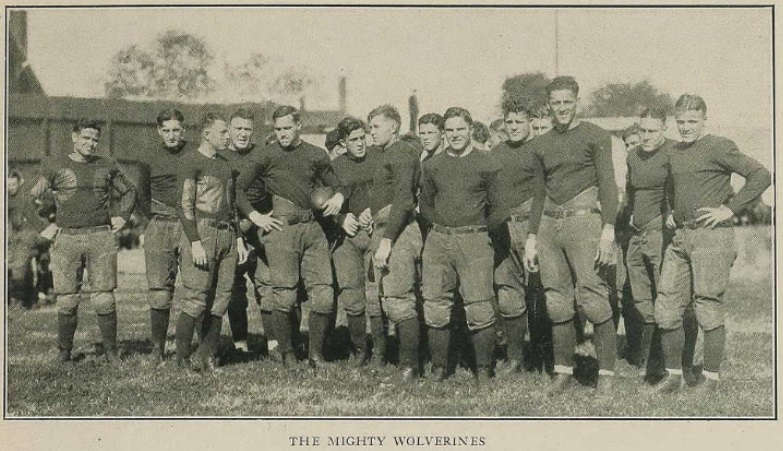
The Wolverines in Nashville.

Jess Neely, Lynn Bomar, and Gil Reese were credited with strong performances against Michigan. Although the result was viewed as a disappointment among Michigan fans, the 1923 Michiganensian noted that the game had matched "two of the best football machines in the country" and proved that Michigan's inexperienced line had become "a dependable stonewall defense." Michigan was the only team to shut out Vanderbilt during the 1921 or 1922 seasons. Vanderbilt and Michigan were the top two defenses in the nation as measured by points against per game. Vanderbilt under McGugin was one of the first great Southern football teams, and put together consecutive undefeated seasons in 1921 and 1922. During those years, with help from line coach Wallace Wade, the Commodores shut out the leading football teams in the South, including Alabama in 1921 (14–0), Texas in 1921 (20–0), Tennessee in 1921 (14–0), Georgia in 1922 (12–0), Kentucky in 1922 (9–0), and Sewanee twice (9–0 and 26–0).

Michigan's starting lineup against Vanderbilt was Kirk (left end), Muirhead (left tackle), Blott (left guard), Slaughter (center), Steele (right guard), VanDervoort (right tackle), Goebel (right end), Uteritz (quarterback), Kipke (left halfback), Roby (right halfback), and Cappon (fullback). Substitutions for Michigan were by Neisch, Rosatti, Knode, Henderson, and Steger.

=== Week 3: at Ohio State ===
Week 3: Michigan at Ohio State

Team	1	2	3	4	Total
• Michigan	3	7	6	3	19
Ohio State	0	0	0	0	0

- Date: October 21, 1922
- Location: Ohio Stadium
  Columbus, Ohio
- Game attendance: 72,000
- Referee: Horatio B. Hackett

After the scoreless tie with Vanderbilt, Michigan traveled to Columbus, Ohio, and for the second week in a row participated in the dedication ceremonies for a new football stadium – Ohio Stadium. Interest in the game was intensified due to the opening of the new stadium and because Ohio State had beaten Michigan three years in a row – the Buckeyes' longest winning streak in the Michigan–Ohio State football rivalry up to that time. The animosity was also fueled by rumors that Ohio State officials had instigated a Big Ten investigation into the eligibility of Michigan halfback, Doug Roby.

More than two weeks before the game, Fielding Yost placed an order for an additional 5,000 seats for Michigan supporters, supplementing 10,000 seats that had already been allotted to Michigan. A total of 16,000 Michigan supporters attended the game, shrinking Ann Arbor's population to less than half of its normal size. Some traveled on Pullman cars pulled by special trains, and others traveled by automobile. One newspaper reported on the exodus as follows:

"Automobile parties will start from Ann Arbor on Friday and will form a steady parade between here and Columbus. Students by the hundreds have purchased second hand cars to make the trip and it is expected that these old broken down flivvers will greatly exceed the number of higher price cars."

When the team left Ann Arbor on Thursday evening, a large crowd gathered at the station. Coach Yost spoke briefly, assuring the crowd that the team was "ready for anything the Buckeyes offer." The day before the game, The New York Times published a story about speculators asking $15 for $2.50 seats, adding, "Columbus is preparing for the greatest influx of football enthusiasts the city has ever entertained." Although the capacity of the new stadium was 63,000, temporary bleachers were erected along the sidelines and "into every nook and cranny of the big structure. Reports of the crowd size ranged from 72,000 to 80,000.

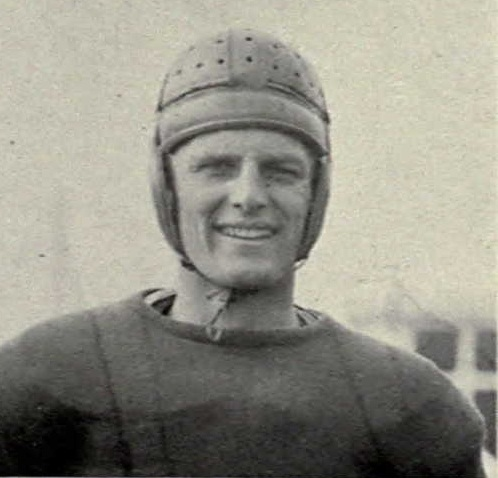
Team captain Paul Goebel

Michigan won, 19–0, in a game that The New York Times wrote had "crowned the greatest day in mid Western football history." Harry Kipke and Paul Goebel were the stars of the game, scoring all 19 points for Michigan – two touchdowns and a field goal by Kipke and a field goal and an extra point by Goebel. Both also played important roles in smothering Ohio State's vaunted passing game. Ohio State attempted 20 passes, 10 of which were incomplete and three of which were intercepted. Kipke intercepted two passes, and his first touchdown came on a 45-yard interception return. The New York Times wrote that "[t]he fleet, agile Kipke intercepted passes and tore through Ohio's scattered defense for long gains." Dick Meade, sports editor of The Toledo News-Bee, wrote that Yost had "his great ace in the hole, the brilliant Kipke, who booted for distance and accuracy, who ran like the wind and who was a marvel of efficiency in sensing pass plays and breaking them up."

Goebel played in the game with an injured knee and wore a fitted steel hinge – an early version of a knee brace. "Before each game, Goebel liberally oiled the hinge to get free action", but his playing time was limited because "the constant action would dry the oil and then the steel would become so hot that Goebel could not continue playing." Despite the limitations of the knee brace, Goebel blocked a punt in the first quarter and then kicked a long field goal from the 30-yard line for the game's first points. He also penetrated into the Ohio State backfield in the second quarter to recover a fumble. As the game wore on, the Buckeyes "seemed to realize (Goebel's) importance in the Michigan lineup because he was forced to take plenty of punishment." Sports columnist Billy Evans wrote:

"No end in recent years has played a greater game (than) that which Goebel put up against Ohio State. For three periods Goebel was the mainspring of the Michigan eleven. He seemed to be in every play. It was always Goebel who was gumming things up for State. No man could go through an entire game at the speed with which Goebel played in the first three quarters. It was beyond the power of any human being. With a few minutes to play in the third period the big fellow practically collapsed. Even when three or four of his teammates were carrying him off the field the old spirit was still there. He tried to induce his teammates that he was able to play, and tried to break away from their grasp, but the punch was gone and he was forced to give way as the big crowd cheered him to the echo. If any one man made possible the defeat of State by Michigan, it was Captain Paul Goebel."

The rotunda at Ohio Stadium is painted with maize flowers on a blue background due to the outcome of the 1922 dedication game. The victory came at significant expense to Michigan, as right tackle Ed VanDervoort sustained a broken arm, Doug Roby sustained a tear in knee ligaments, and Paul Goebel left the game with an ankle injury.

Michigan's starting lineup against Ohio State was Kirk (left end), Muirhead (left tackle), Rosatti (left guard), Blott (center), Johns (right guard), VanDervoort (right tackle), Goebel (right end), Uteritz (quarterback), Roby (left halfback), Kipke (right halfback), and Cappon (fullback).

=== Week 4: Illinois ===
Week 4: Illinois at Michigan

Team	1	2	3	4	Total
Illinois	0	0	0	0	0
• Michigan	0	10	14	0	24

- Date: October 28, 1922
- Location: Ferry Field
  Ann Arbor, Michigan
- Game attendance: 41,000
- Referee: Walter Eckersall

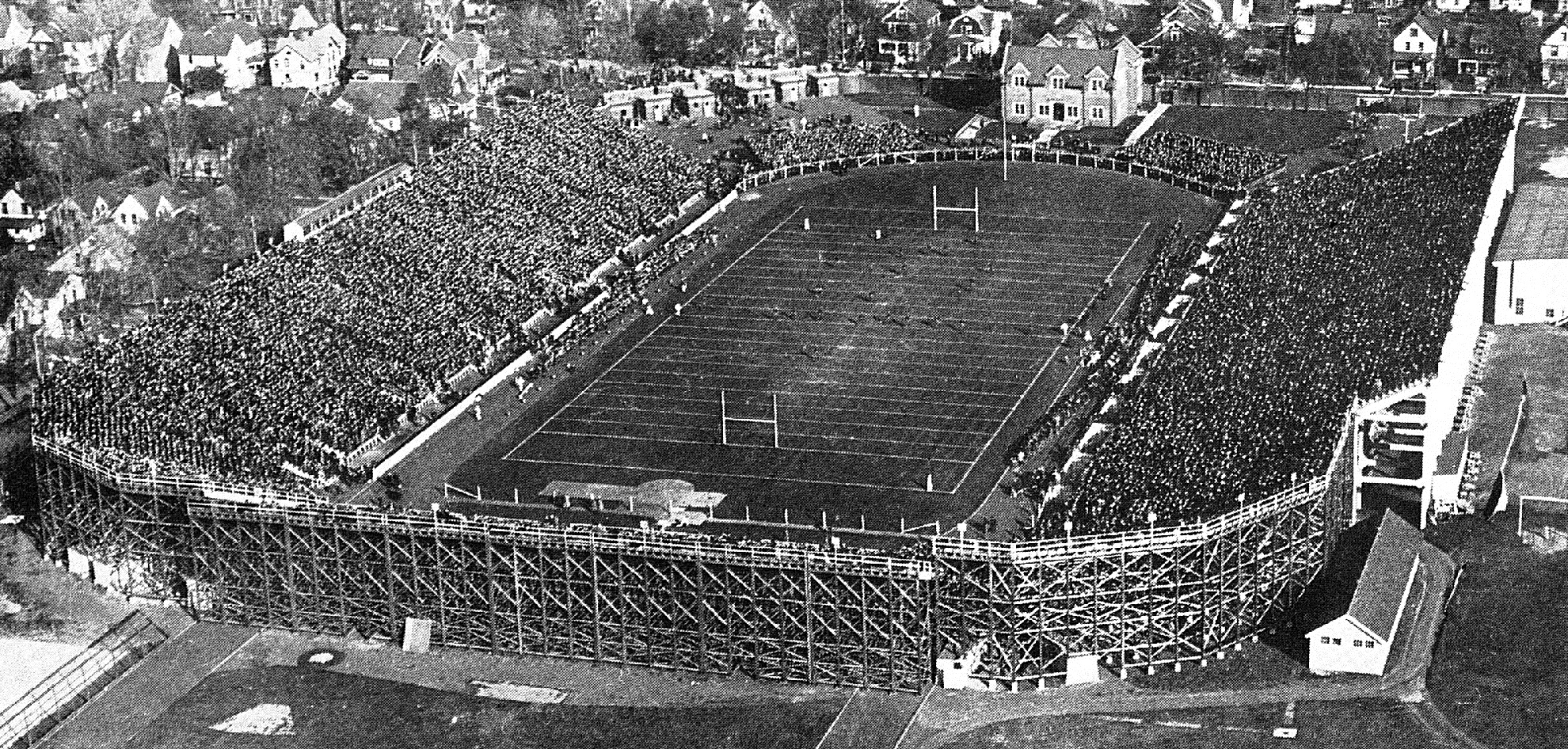
Aerial view of Ferry Field prior to the opening kick-off against Illinois.

For its fourth game, Michigan defeated Illinois, 24–0. After being held scoreless in the first quarter, Michigan scored 24 points in the second and third quarters. In the Detroit Free Press, Harry Bullion wrote: "Like an avalanche, slow to start but a blizzard when it gained momentum, the Maize and Blue eleven literally crushed the Suckers, buried them, as it were, under a decisive defeat." Michigan's three touchdowns were scored by Franklin Cappon, Bernard Kirk, and Herb Steger. Cappon's touchdown was set up when Paul Goebel recovered a fumbled punt on the Illinois 20-yard line and ran it back to the 12-yard line. Cappon scored on his third run into the Illinois line. Later in the second quarter, Jack Blott intercepted a pass on the Illinois 27-yard line, and a pass from Steger to Kirk brought the ball to the 12-yard line. Goebel kicked a field goal from the 15-yard line to give Michigan a 10–0 lead at halftime.

The second half opened with Illinois kicking off to Michigan. Kirk caught the ball at either the 15-yard line, or the 20-yard line, and returned it 80 or 85 yards for a touchdown. Illinois quarterback Dawson clutched at Kirk's ankles at the 12-yard line, but Kirk was able to shake free and fell into the end zone. When Kirk fell across the goal line, the steel and concrete stands at Ferry Field vibrated vociferously as the crowd reacted to the play. Bullion wrote that Kirk's 80-yard return "will take rank with the most brilliant football achievements of any of Michigan's illustrious sons of the gridiron." Michigan's third touchdown came on a fourth-down pass from Ray Knode to Herb Steger. Steger was reported to have been standing across the goal line "as clean as a hound's tooth unguarded." Extra points were kicked by Paul Goebel and Ray Knode (2). Goebel also kicked a field goal. Michigan was penalized twice in the game, once for off-side and once for "unnecessary holding."

Michigan's starting lineup against Illinois was Kirk (left end), Muirhead (left tackle), Johns (left guard), Blott (center), Steele (right guard), Rosatti (right tackle), Goebel (right end), Uteritz (quarterback), Steger (left halfback), Knode (right halfback), and Cappon (fullback). The only substitution for Michigan was Slaughter for Johns.

=== Week 5: Michigan Agricultural ===
Week 5: Michigan Agricultural at Michigan

Team	1	2	3	4	Total
Michigan Agricultural	0	0	0	0	0
• Michigan	14	19	9	21	63

- Date: November 4, 1922
- Location: Ferry Field
  Ann Arbor, Michigan
- Game attendance: 25,000–42,000
- Referee: Ray (Illinois)

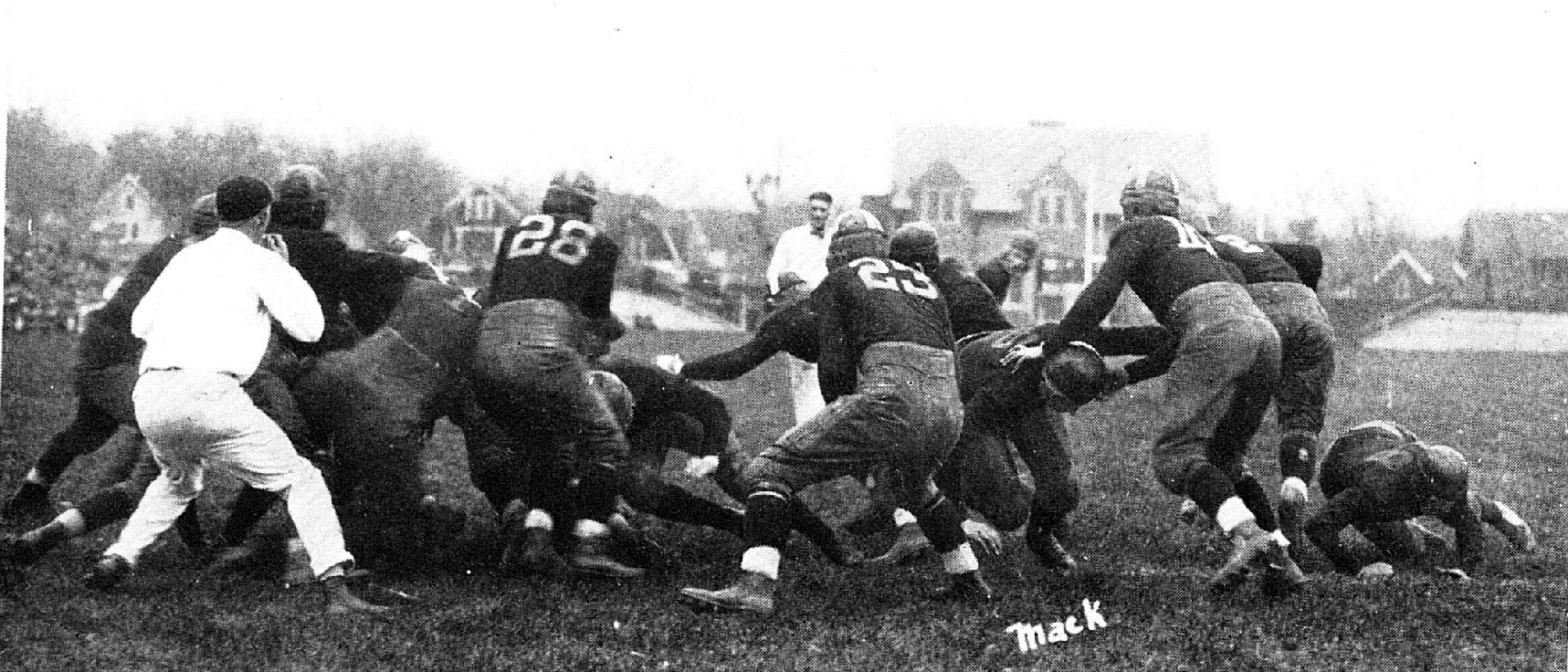
Franklin Cappon plunges into the Aggies' line for a touchdown.

For its fifth game, Michigan defeated the team from Michigan Agricultural College, 63–0. Lloyd Northard wrote in the Detroit Free Press that "not in the past 10 years has an Aggie team been so utterly out-classed in every department of the game." Fully embracing the passing game, Michigan threw 33 passes with 17 completions. Northard wrote that the game at times "more resembled basketball than football" and called it "the greatest exhibition of aerial play ever witnessed on Ferry Field", setting records for both passes thrown and completed.

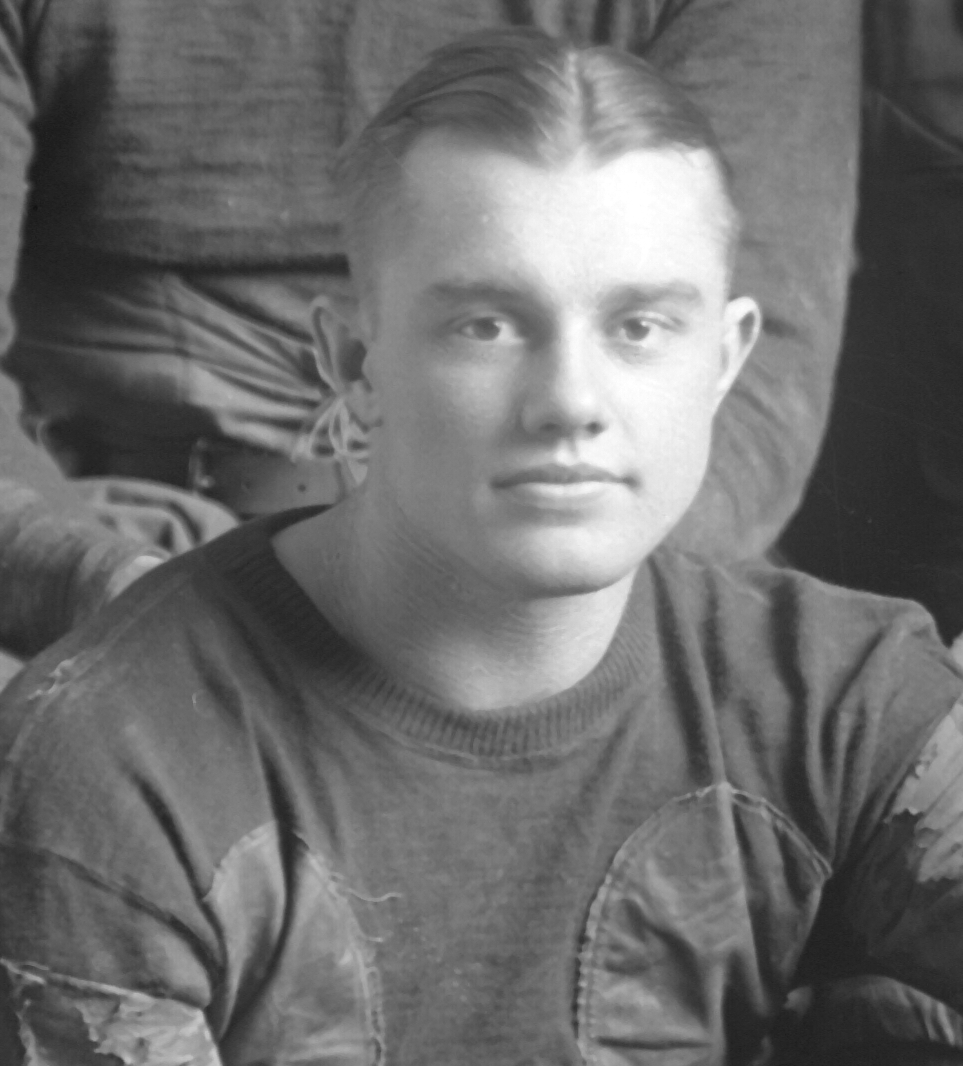
Quarterback Irwin Uteritz injured his ankle on a touchdown

Michigan's first touchdown came on a 29-yard pass from Harry Kipke to Irwin Uteritz. Uteritz injured his ankle on the play and was replaced at quarterback by Ray Knode. Paul Goebel place-kicked for the extra point. On Michigan's second scoring drive, Kipke accounted for most of Michigan's 56 yards, and Knode ran for the touchdown from the one-yard line. Goebel again place-kicked for the extra point. At the start of the second quarter, Michigan drove 53 yards for its third touchdown. The drive featured runs of 16 and 18 yards by Kipke around the ends and a 17-yard gain on a pass from Kipke to Jackson Keefer. Franklin Cappon carried the ball across the goal line for the touchdown. Goebel missed the extra point, and Michigan led, 20–0. Later in the quarter, Michigan drove 66 yards for its fourth touchdown. The drive featured a 46-yard gain on a pass from Knode to Goebel who was tackled at the Aggies' 20-yard line. Cappon carried the ball over the goal line for his second touchdown of the quarter. Kipke drop-kicked for the extra point, and Michigan led, 27–0. Near the end of the first half, Stanley Muirhead blocked a punt on the Aggies' 12-yard line. Michigan faked a field goal, and Goebel passed to Keefer for the touchdown. Kipke missed the extra point, and Michigan led, 33–0, at halftime.

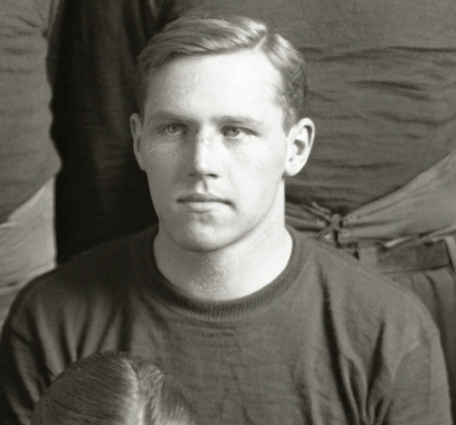
Left tackle Stanley Muirhead blocked an Aggie punt.

During the third quarter, Michigan played with substitutes at every position. On Michigan's first possession of the quarter, Steger place-kicked for a field goal to extend the lead to 36–0. Steger also had a 41-yard punt return in the third quarter, but the Wolverines were unable to score. Late in the third quarter, LeRoy Neisch blocked a pass from McMillan, pulled it in for an interception, and returned the ball 35 yards for a touchdown. A pass attempt for the extra point was incomplete, and Michigan led, 42–0. Michigan's starters returned to the game in the fourth quarter and scored three more touchdowns. Steger, from a place-kick formation, ran 30 yards for the seventh touchdown, and Kipke drop-kicked for the extra point. On the next possession, Michigan scored on a 65-yard drive that included a 53-yard gain on a pass from Steger to Neisch. Kipke then scored on a ten-yard pass from Knode, and Kipke drop-kicked for the extra point. Michigan's final drive featured a one-handed catch by Steger on a pass from Knode and ended with a six-yard touchdown run by Knode. Steger kicked the extra point to give the Wolverines a 63–0 victory.

Michigan's 63 points were scored by Knode (13), Cappon (12), Steger (10), Kipke (9), Uteritz (6), Keefer (6), Neisch (6), and Goebel (1). Michigan's starting lineup against the Aggies was Kirk (left end), Rosatti (left tackle), Steele (left guard), Blott (center), Slaughter (right guard), Muirhead (right tackle), Goebel (right end), Uteritz (quarterback), Kipke (left halfback), Steger (right halfback), and Cappon (fullback). Players appearing in the game as substitutes were Knode, Johns, Van Orden, Dunleavy, Garfield, Henderson, Blahnik, White, Gunther, Rankin, Chamberlain, Heath, Smith, and Tracey.

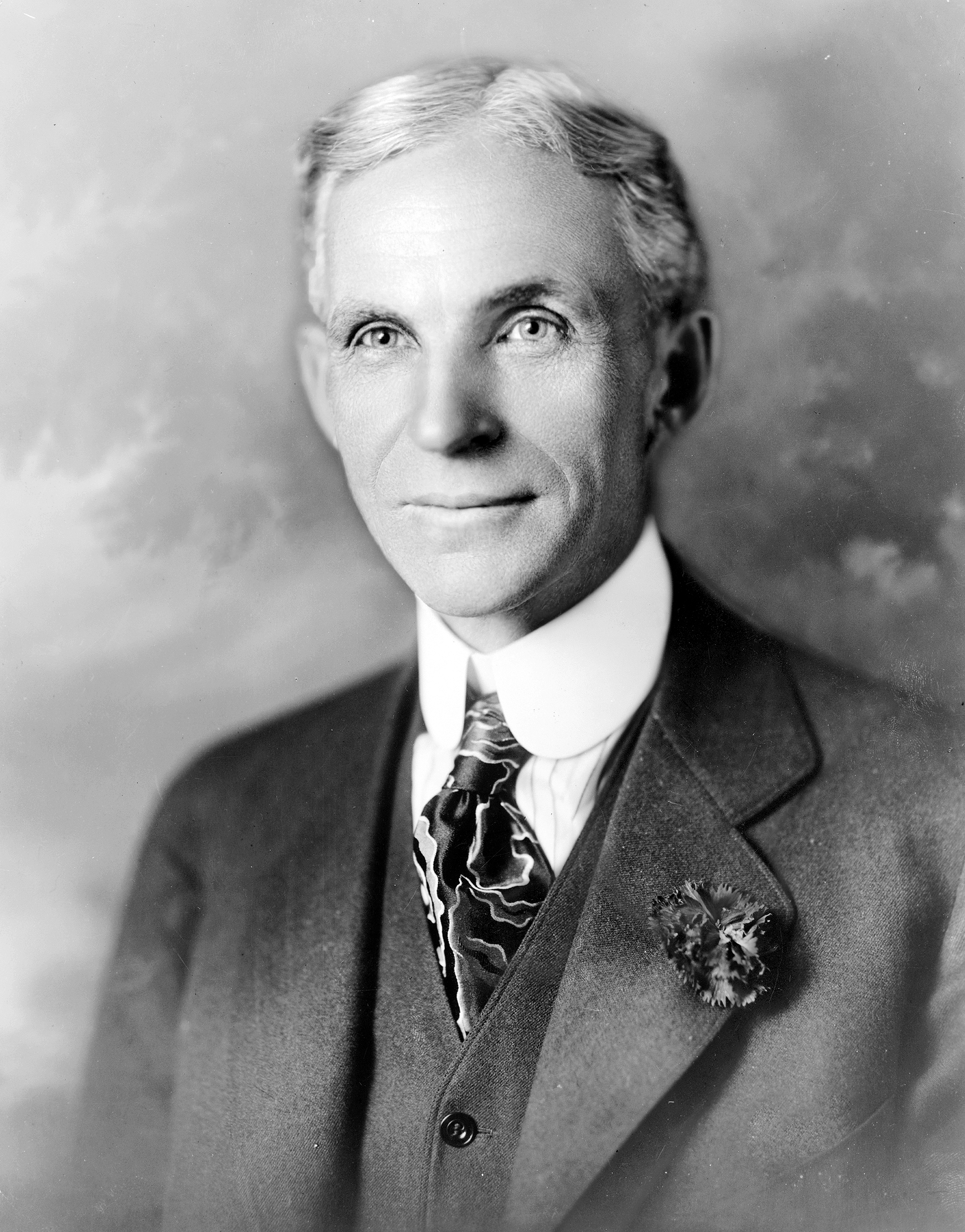
Even Henry Ford could not get tickets to the 1922 Wisconsin game.

=== Week 6: Wisconsin ===
Week 6: Wisconsin at Michigan

Team	1	2	3	4	Total
Wisconsin	0	0	0	6	6
• Michigan	0	0	7	6	13

- Date: November 18, 1922
- Location: Ferry Field
  Ann Arbor, Michigan
- Game attendance: 42,000
- Referee: Masker (Northwestern)

After a bye week, Michigan played Wisconsin at Ferry Field on November 18, 1922. A week before the game, The New York Times reported that demand for tickets was so intense that even Henry Ford was unable to obtain seats. The game drew a crowd of 42,000 spectators – estimated to be "at least as large as the record breaking number" that attended the 1921 Michigan–Ohio State game. Michigan's head coach, Fielding Yost, traveled to watch Wisconsin play Minnesota one week earlier, and the Associated Press called the game "a clear example of the value of scouting football games", as Wisconsin had no plays that had not already been studied closely by Yost.

In the first half, defense dominated, and neither team scored. A drive into Michigan territory during the second quarter was stopped when Jackson Keefer intercepted a Wisconsin pass. In the second half, cloud cover brought darkness to the field. Michigan opened up its offense with a passing attack that Yost had been developing for three weeks. The Associated Press called Michigan's second half attack "one of the most brilliant ever seen on Ferry Field." In the third quarter, Harry Kipke led Michigan on a 65-yard scoring drive that included a 25-yard pass from Paul Goebel to Kipke, a 10-yard pass from Kipke to Keefer, and runs of 10 and 11 yards by Kipke. Fullback Franklin Cappon carried the ball from the one-yard line for the touchdown, and Goebel kicked the extra point from placement. Michigan led 7–0 at the end of the third quarter.

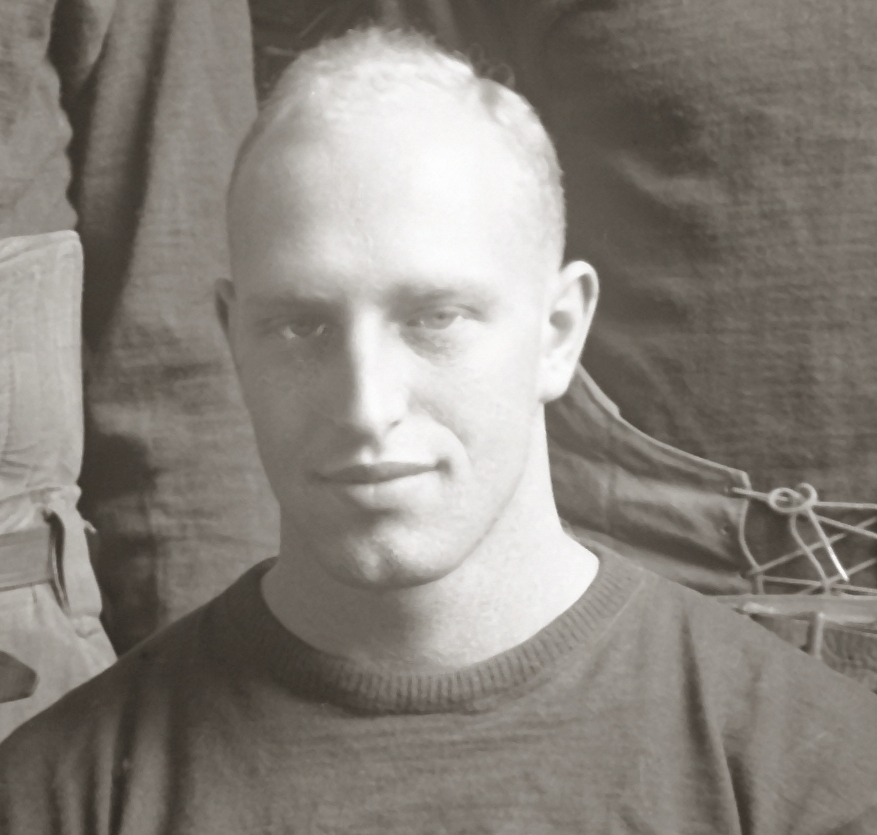
Fullback Franklin Cappon ran the length of the field vs. Wisconsin.

Early in the fourth quarter, Irwin Uteritz threw to Kipke from mid-field, and Kipke ran 40 yards for Michigan's second touchdown. The Associated Press wrote:

"His run of nearly half the length of the field for a touchdown in the final period was all the most ardent seeker after football thrills could ask. During the first 20 yards of the run Kipke eluded a number of Wisconsin players by dodging around them. Then he fell in behind a trio of Wolverines who provided interference and his run was unbroken."

Kipke's drop-kick for the extra point was unsuccessful, and Michigan led 13–0. Late in the fourth quarter, a punt by Kipke went out of bounds at Michigan's 42-yard line. Wisconsin then drove down the field to score the first points allowed by Michigan during the 1922 season. The touchdown was scored by Pulaski on a pass from Wallace Barr. Merrill Taft's drop-kick for the extra point was blocked, and the game ended on the ensuing kick return. Michigan won, 13–6.

Only one penalty was called in the game, a 15-yard holding penalty against Wisconsin. Former University of Chicago All-American Walter Eckersall served as the linesman. After watching the game, Eckersall opined that Yost "has lost none of his cunning." He cited two plays as evidence of the mental acuity of the Michigan team. The first play followed a substitution for Wisconsin's All-American end Gus Tebell. Uteritz faked a handoff to Cappon who dove into the middle of the line, drawing the Wisconsin substitute into the play while Kipke ran around the end. The second play was "the old talking play" in which Michigan's team captain Goebel walked from his position at right end, appearing to reprimand Uteritz for the prior call. According to Eckersall, "The Badger forwards relaxed in their charging positions and as they did so the ball was snapped and another large gain was made."

Michigan's starting lineup against Wisconsin was Kirk (left end), Rosatti (left tackle), Steele (left guard), Blott (center), Slaughter (right guard), Muirhead (right tackle), Goebel (right end), Uteritz (quarterback), Kipke (left halfback), Steger (right halfback), and Cappon (fullback).

=== Week 7: at Minnesota ===
Week 7: Michigan at Minnesota

Team	1	2	3	4	Total
• Michigan	0	13	0	3	16
Minnesota	7	0	0	0	7

- Date: November 25, 1922
- Location: Northrop Field
  Minneapolis
- Game attendance: 20,000

Michigan finished its season on the road against Minnesota. The Wolverines won, 16–7, securing a tie with undefeated Iowa for the Big Ten championship. The 1922 Minnesota team was led by Earl Martineau, who was a first-team halfback on the New York Tribune's 1922 College Football All-America Team (and who later served as an assistant coach at Michigan from 1938 to 1945).

In the first quarter, Minnesota recovered a fumble at Michigan's eight-yard line, and Otis McCreary ran for a touchdown. Ray Eklund drop-kicked for the extra point, and Minnesota led, 7–0. In the second quarter, Martineau punted from his own endzone, and the ball rolled out of bounds at the Minnesota 17-yard line. Michigan drove to the one-yard line on runs by Harry Kipke and Franklin Cappon. Kipke ran it in on a sweep around Minnesota's left end for the touchdown. Paul Goebel's place-kick for the extra point was low, and Minnesota's lead was narrowed to 7–6. Late in the second quarter, Irwin Uteritz returned a punt 20 yards to Michigan's 46-yard line. The Wolverines then drove 54 yards, mostly on a 44-yard run by Cappon. At the end of the drive, Cappon dove into the endzone from the one-foot line, and Jack Blott converted the extra point from a place-kick. Michigan led 13–7 at halftime.

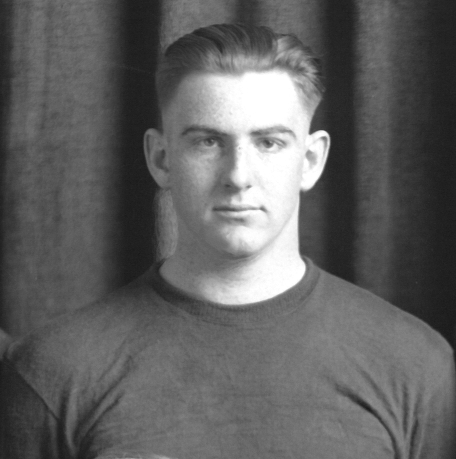
Center Jack Blott was also the team's placekicker.

In the second half, Michigan held Minnesota scoreless and intercepted five of Martineau's passes (three by Kipke and two by Jackson Keefer). Michigan's final points were scored after a pass from Uteritz to Bernard Kirk took the ball to Minnesota's 17-yard line. The drive was halted, and Blott kicked a field goal from the 20-yard line.

Michigan's starting lineup against Minnesota was Kirk (left end), Muirhead (left tackle), Slaughter (left guard), Blott (center), Steele (right guard), ____ (right tackle), Neisch (right end), Uteritz (quarterback), Keefer (left halfback), Kipke (right halfback), and Cappon (fullback).

== Post-season ==
The 1922 season ended with Iowa and Michigan having undefeated records. Chicago was also undefeated in conference play. Officially, there was a three-way tie for the Big Ten football championship. Discussion of a post-season game to settle the championship was rejected by Big Ten Commissioner John L. Griffith on grounds that a conference rule limited teams to seven games. On November 27, 1922, Fielding Yost announced that Michigan would make no claim to sole possession of the conference championship. Yost also expressed his intention to continue as the head football coach, although he said that he would delegate many of the coaching duties to George Little for the 1923 season.

In late November, the 21 players who had received varsity letters for football gathered for the team portrait at an Ann Arbor photographic studio. After the portrait was taken, the team elected Harry Kipke as the captain of the 1923 team.

After the 1922 season ended, halfback Harry Kipke was selected by Walter Camp as a first-team member of the Collier's Weekly All-America team. He also received first-team All-American honors from Athletic world (based on polling of 214 coaches), Walter Eckersall, Norman E. Brown (sports editor of the Central Press Association), and Lawrence Perry. Kipke was also selected by Norman E. Brown as the best all-round player of the 1922 season.

Team captain and right end Paul Goebel was also selected as a first-team All-American by Athletic world. Left end Bernard Kirk was chosen as a first-team All-American by Walter Eckersall.

With the proliferation of All-American selectors, the Romelke Press Clipping Bureau assembled a consensus All-American team based on its compilation of the votes of "nearly every important pressman who has picked an All-American team." Romelke also ranked the nation's top football teams based on the total number of votes its players received in the All-America voting. Michigan ranked as the No. 1 team in the country under Romelke's statistics with Iowa and Chicago finishing in second and third places. The top five were as follows:

School	Votes	Members	Names of members
Michigan	385	7	Harry Kipke (99), Paul Goebel (67), Bernard Kirk (66), Stanley Muirhead (51), Irwin Uteritz (30), Oliver Aas (29), Franklin Cappon (23)
Iowa	345	5	Gordon Locke (111), Paul Minnick (93), John Heldt (69), Thompson (39), Max Kadesky (33)
Chicago	268	4	McMillen (83), King (66), John Webster Thomas (65), Fletcher (64)
Princeton	259	4	Herb Treat (96), Gray (93), Baker (38), Dickinson (25)
Army	254	5	Edgar Garbisch (78), Fritz Breidster (76), Smythe (48), Mulligan (31), Wood (23)

=== Death of Bernard Kirk ===
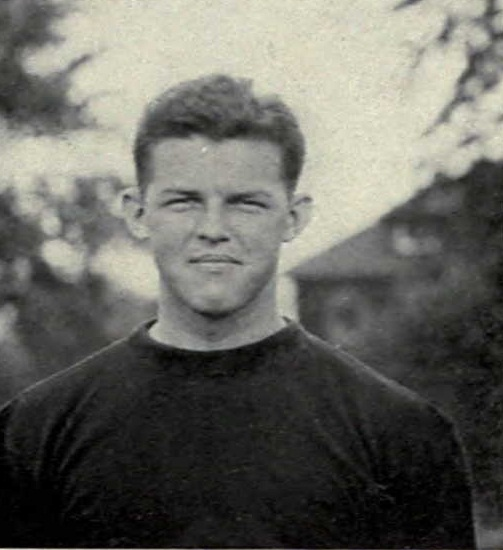
Bernard Kirk

In the early morning hours of Sunday, December 17, 1922, Michigan end Bernard Kirk sustained a fractured skull and internal injuries in an automobile accident. Kirk and four others were returning to Ann Arbor after a night in Detroit when the car in which Kirk was a passenger slid off an icy road and crashed into a telephone pole. The other four members of the party, including former Michigan football player Eddie Usher, were either uninjured or sustained only minor injuries. Kirk was taken to Beyer Memorial Hospital in Ypsilanti unconscious and in critical condition.

Over the next week, newspapers across the country followed the daily changes in Kirk's condition. On Sunday evening, Kirk remained unconscious and doctors expressed fear for his recovery. Early in the week, Kirk's condition was much improved, and Kirk's father reported that physicians had told him that his son would recover.

Kirk suffered what was reported as a "slight relapse" on Wednesday. The United Press reported that Kirk's pulse was down, and doctors expressed fears that meningitis might develop. Doctors expressed hope that Kirk's "fine physical condition will pull him through," and his condition improved again on Thursday. After an up-and-down week, meningitis set in, and Kirk died on Saturday morning, December 23, 1922. On learning of Kirk's passing, Kirk's teammate Harry Kipke told reporters, "Bernie Kirk was one of the best liked boys that ever wore a Michigan uniform. He was one of the greatest ends the University ever had, and he was a real fellow in every respect."

Hundreds of telegrams of condolence were sent to the family "from all parts of the world", including one from Walter Camp, which read: "We shall not soon forget the remarkable play on the gridiron of Bernard Kirk, a star indeed and one of those indefatigable performers combining both brain and physique with speed and judgment, a fine example of real football players." Many newspapers noted the coincidence that Kirk and George Gipp had both died before all of the All-American teams had been announced (Gipp had died in December 1920). Knute Rockne recalled that Gipp and Kirk, who had been teammates at Notre Dame, had been "great pals" and "practically inseparable." A Wisconsin newspaper made the following observation:

"[Kirk] had played end on the Notre Dame eleven before coming to Michigan, and the death of Kirk marks the passing of that ill fated but brilliant Notre Dame combination of Gipp to Kirk. Like Kirk, George Gipp, died in the height of his stardom, just after the close of a season in which he was picked by most critics for the all-American. As a member of the Notre Dame team Kirk played end and received most of the passes hurled by Gipp."

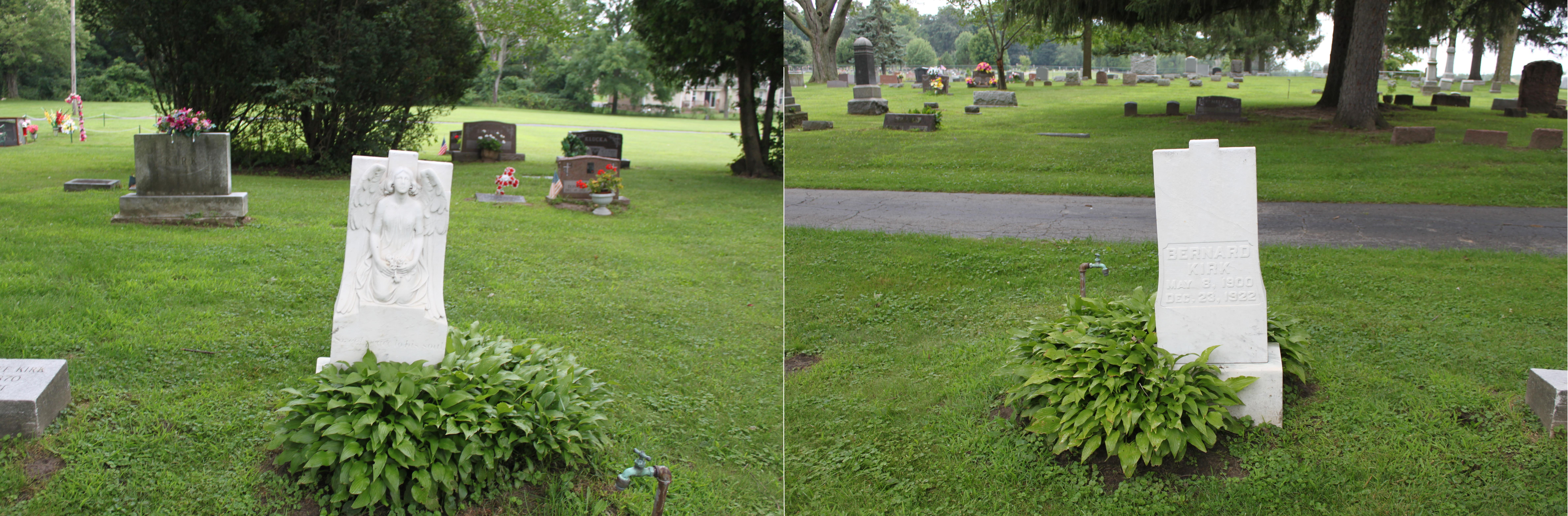
Bernard Kirk's grave, St. John Cemetery

Kirk's funeral, held in Ypsilanti, was covered by newspapers across the United States. The church where the requiem mass was held "could not accommodate a tenth of those attending the services." Kirk's honorary pallbearers included University of Michigan President Marion Leroy Burton, Michigan Governor Alex Groesbeck, Fielding H. Yost, and two U.S. Congressmen. His casket was carried to the grave by eight of his Michigan teammates, including Harry Kipke, Paul Goebel, Irwin Uteritz, and Franklin Cappon. One account described the emotional response of Kirk's teammates at the funeral: "As the casket bearing the body of the former University of Michigan football star was slowly lowered into his last resting place, husky athletes who battled with him on the football fields for the glory and honor of Michigan sobbed unashamed."

== Personnel ==
=== Depth chart ===
The following chart provides a visual depiction of Michigan's lineup during the 1922 season with games started at the position reflected in parentheses. The chart mimics Yost's short punt formation while on offense, with the quarterback under center.

LE
Bernard Kirk (6)
LeRoy Neisch (1)

LT	LG	C	RG	RT
Stanley Muirhead (7)	Edliff Slaughter (3)	Jack Blott (6)	Harold O. Steele (5)	Rudy Rosatti (4)
Howell S. White (0)	Rudy Rosatti (2)	Edliff Slaughter (1)	James Edward Johns (2)	Ed Vandervoot (3)
	James Edward Johns (1)		William J. Van Orden (0)	
	Harold O. Steele (1)			

RE
Paul G. Goebel (5)
William P. Henderson (1)
LeRoy Neisch (1)

QB
Irwin Uteritz (6)
Robert T. Knode (1)

LHB	RHB
Doug Roby (3)	Harry Kipke (5)
Herb Steger (2)	Jackson Keefer (1)
Jackson Keefer (1)	Ray Knode (1)
Harry Kipke (1)	

FB
Franklin Cappon (7)
George Dunleavy (0)

=== Varsity letter winners ===
Number	Player	Position	Games started	Hometown	Prep school	Height	Weight	Age
12	Jack Blott	Center	6	Girard, Ohio				
5	Franklin Cappon	Fullback	7	Holland, Michigan				
26	Louis B. Curran	End	0	Louisville, Kentucky				
15	George Dunleavy	Fullback	0	Gary, Indiana				
27	Stephen M. Garfield	Tackle	0	Albion, Michigan				
1	Paul G. Goebel	End	5	Grand Rapids, Michigan				
17	William P. Henderson	End	1	Detroit, Michigan				
2	James Edward Johns	Guard	3	Lansing, Michigan				
18	Jackson Keefer	Halfback	2	Dayton, Ohio				
6	Harry Kipke	Halfback	6	Lansing, Michigan		5'11"	155	23
7	Bernard Kirk	Halfback	6	Ypsilanti, Michigan				
8	Robert T. Knode	Halfback, quarterback	2	Baltimore, Maryland				
11	Stanley Muirhead	Tackle	7	Detroit, Michigan	Northern H.S.			
9	LeRoy E. Neisch	End	2	Detroit, Michigan	Eastern H.S.			
4	Doug Roby	Halfback	3	Coldwater, Michigan				
13	Rudy Rosatti	Tackle, guard	6	Norway, Michigan				
10	Edliff Slaughter	Guard, center	4	Louisville, Kentucky				
21	Harold O. Steele	Guard	6	Sioux City, Iowa				
22	Herb Steger	Halfback	2	Oak Park, Illinois	Oak Park H.S.			
25	Irwin Uteritz	Quarterback	6	Oak Park, Illinois	Oak Park H.S.	5'7"	140	23
24	William J. Van Orden	Guard	0	Ann Arbor, Michigan				
3	Ed R. VanDervoort	Tackle	3	Lansing, Michigan				
	Howell S. White	Tackle	0	Ashton, Michigan				

=== aMa letter winners ===
- Joseph G. Blahnick, Menominee, Michigan – tackle
- Robert W. Chamberlain, Lakewood, Ohio – tackle
- John F. Gunther, Goshen, Indiana – fullback
- Milton W. Heath, Albion, Michigan – guard
- William P. Henderson, Detroit, Michigan – end
- Daniel N. Rankin, Shelby, Michigan – halfback
- Murray Smith, Detroit– tackle
- Fred S. Tracey, Chicago – quarterback

=== Scoring leaders ===
Player	Touchdowns	Extra points	Field goals	Points
Harry Kipke	7	3	1	48
Franklin Cappon	6	0	0	36
Herb Steger	3	2	1	23
Ray Knode	2	8	0	20
Doug Roby	3	0	0	18
Paul G. Goebel	0	4	2	10
Jackson Keefer	1	0	0	6
Bernard Kirk	1	0	0	6
LeRoy Neisch	1	0	0	6
Irwin Uteritz	1	0	0	6
Jack Blott	0	1	1	4
TOTAL	24	18	5	183

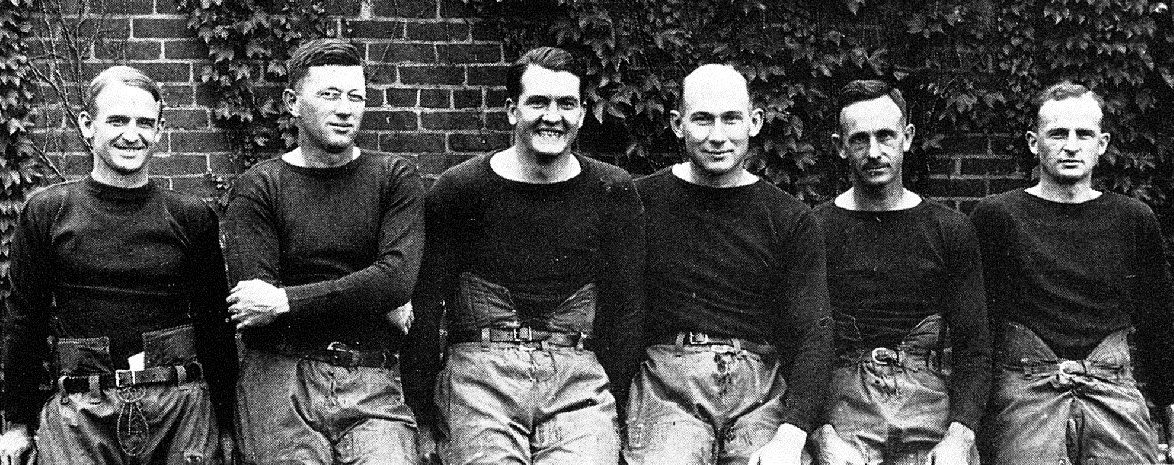
1922 coaching staff, left to right: Archie Hahn (trainer), Edwin Mather, Angus Goetz, Tad Wieman, Ray Fisher and A. J. Sturzenegger.

=== Coaching staff ===
- Head coach: Fielding H. Yost
- Assistant coaches: George Little, Ernie Vick, Tad Wieman, A. J. Sturzenegger, Ray Fisher, Edwin Mather
- Trainer: Archie Hahn
- Manager: William G. Lichtenburg Jr.
