= 1922 Big Ten Conference football season =

- Sport: Football
- Teams: 10
- Co-champions: Iowa, Michigan

Football seasons
- 1921 1923

1922 Big Ten Conference football standings
	Conf.					Overall
Team	W		L		T	W		L		T
Iowa +	5	–	0	–	0	7	–	0	–	0
Michigan +	4	–	0	–	0	6	–	0	–	1
Chicago +	4	–	0	–	1	5	–	1	–	1
Wisconsin	2	–	2	–	1	4	–	2	–	1
Minnesota	2	–	3	–	1	3	–	3	–	1
Illinois	2	–	4	–	0	2	–	5	–	0
Northwestern	1	–	3	–	1	3	–	3	–	1
Ohio State	1	–	4	–	0	3	–	4	–	0
Indiana	0	–	2	–	1	1	–	4	–	2
Purdue	0	–	3	–	1	1	–	5	–	1
+ – Conference co-champions

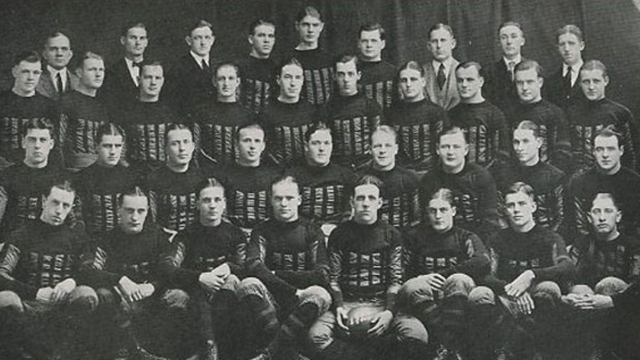
1922 Iowa Hawkeyes

1922 Big Ten Conference football season was the 27th season of college football played by the member schools of the Big Ten Conference (also known as the Western Conference) and was a part of the 1922 college football season.

Iowa, under head coach Howard Jones, compiled a perfect 7–0 records and led the conference in scoring offense with 29.7 points per game, and Michigan led the conference in scoring defense with 1.9 points allowed per game. Quarterback Gordon Locke was a consensus first-team All-American. The 1922 Iowa team was retroactively selected as the national champion by the Billingsley Report.

Michigan compiled a record of 6–0–1, led the conference in scoring defense at 1.9 points allowed per game, shut out five opponents, and tied for the Big Ten championship. Michigan's lone blemish was a scoreless tie in the 1922 Michigan vs. Vanderbilt football game. Halfback Harry Kipke was a consensus first-team All-American. Left end Bernard Kirk, who also received first-team All-American honors, died of meningitis in December 1922 after sustaining a brain injury in an automobile crash.

== Season overview ==
=== Results and team statistics ===
Conf. Rank	Team	Head coach	Overall record	Conf. record	PPG	PAG
1 (tie)	Iowa	Howard Jones	7–0	5–0	29.7	4.7
1 (tie)	Michigan	Fielding H. Yost	6–0–1	4–0	26.1	1.9
3	Chicago	Amos A. Stagg	5–1–1	4–0–1	12.6	5.3
4	Wisconsin	John R. Richards	4–2–1	2–2–1	14.4	3.1
5	Minnesota	William H. Spaulding	3-3-1	2-3-1	11.3	9.3
6	Illinois	Robert Zuppke	2–5	2–4	3.7	8.6
7	Northwestern	Glenn Thistlethwaite	3–3–1	1–3–1	17.0	13.1
8	Ohio State	John Wilce	3–4	1–4	6.1	8.1
9	Indiana	James P. Herron	1–4–2	0–2–1	3.0	16.1
10	Purdue	James Phelan	1–5–1	0–3–1	5.1	18.0

Key
PPG = Average of points scored per game
PAG = Average of points allowed per game

=== Regular season ===
==== October 7 ====
Iowa 61, Knox 0
Michigan 48, Case 0
Chicago 20, Georgia 0
Wisconsin 41, Carleton 0
Minnesota 22, North Dakota 0
Northwestern 17, Beloit 0
Ohio State 5, Ohio Wesleyan 0
Indiana 0, DePauw 0
Purdue 10, James Milliken 0
Butler 10, @ Illinois 7

==== October 14 ====
Iowa 6, @ Yale 0
Michigan 0, @ Vanderbilt 0
Chicago 15, Northwestern 7
Minnesota 20, @ Indiana 0
Ohio State 14, Oberlin 0
Wisconsin 20, South Dakota State 6
Notre Dame 20, @ Purdue 0

==== October 21 ====
Chicago 12, Purdue 0
Iowa 8 @ Illinois 7
Michigan 19, @ Ohio State 0
Minnesota 7, Northwestern 7
Wisconsin 20, Indiana 0

==== October 28 ====
Iowa 56, Purdue 0
Michigan 24, Illinois 0
Minnesota 9, Ohio State 0
Princeton 21, @ Chicago 18
Indiana 14, Michigan Agricultural 6

==== November 4 ====
Michigan 63, Michigan Agricultural 0
Illinois 6, Northwestern 3
Wisconsin, 14, @ Minnesota 0
Notre Dame 27, Indiana 0
Wabash 7, @ Purdue 6

==== November 11 ====
Chicago 14, @ Ohio State 9
Illinois 3, @ Wisconsin 0
Iowa 28, Minnesota 14
Northwestern 24, Purdue 13
West Virginia 33, @ Indiana 0

==== November 18 ====
Iowa 12, @ Ohio State 9
Michigan 13, Wisconsin 6
Chicago 9, Illinois 0
Northwestern 58, Monmouth 14

==== November 25 ====
Indiana 7, Purdue 7
Iowa 37, Northwestern 3
Michigan 16, @ Minnesota 7
Ohio State 6, @ Illinois 3
Wisconsin 0, Chicago 0

=== Bowl games ===
No Big Ten teams participated in any bowl games during the 1922 season.

== All-Big Ten players ==
Players who received the greatest support as first-team players on the 1922 All-Big Ten Conference football team were:

- Bernard Kirk, end, Michigan (CON, CA, CJ, CP, CT, PA, WE)
- Gus Tebell, end, Wisconsin (CJ, CP, CT, PA, WE)
- Marty Below, tackle, Wisconsin (CON, CA, CP, CT, PA, WE)
- Henry D. Penfield, tackle, Northwestern (CON, CA, PA)
- Jim McMillen, guard, Illinois (CON, CA, CP, CT, PA, WE)
- Paul Minick, guard, Iowa (CON, CA, CJ, CP, PA)
- Oliver S. Aas, center, Minnesota (CON, CA)
- Gordon Locke, quarterback/fullback, Iowa (CON, CA, CJ, CP, CT, PA, WE)
- Rollie Williams, quarterback, Wisconsin (CON, CJ, CT, PA, WE)
- Harry Kipke, halfback, Michigan (CON, CA, CJ, CP, CT, PA, WE)
- Earl Martineau, halfback, Minnesota (CA, CP, PA, WE)
- John Webster Thomas, fullback, Chicago (CON, CA, CJ)

== All-Americans ==
Three Big Ten players were recognized as consensus first-team players on the 1922 College Football All-America Team:

- Gordon Locke, quarterback, Iowa (WC, NYT, AW, WE, NB, LP, FM, FH, RO)
- Harry Kipke, halfback, Michigan (WC, AW, WE, NB, LP)
- John Webster Thomas, fullback, Chicago (WC, NYT)

Other Big Ten players receiving first-team honors from at least one selector were:

- Bernard Kirk, end, Michigan (NYT, WE, FH)
- Paul G. Goebel, end, Michigan (NYT, NB, AW, LP, RO)
- Marty Below, tackle, Wisconsin (NYT, NB)
- Leonard Smith, tackle, Wisconsin (NYT)
- Paul Minick, guard, Iowa (NB, RO)
- Jim McMillen, guard, Illinois (FH)
- Lloyd Pixley, guard, Ohio State (NYT)
- Joe Pondelik, guard, Chicago (LP)
- Thomas Long, guard, Ohio State (NYT)
- John Heldt, center Iowa (FH)
- Irwin Uteritz, quarterback, Michigan (FM)
- Earl Martineau, halfback, Minnesota (NYT)
- Otis C. McCreery, halfback, Minnesota (NYT)
