= Gordon Locke =

American football player and coach (1898–1969)

Biographical details
- Born: August 3, 1898; Denison, Iowa, U.S.
- Died: November 9, 1969 (aged 71); Washington, D.C., U.S.

Playing career
- 1920–1922: Iowa
- Position: Fullback

Coaching career (HC unless noted)
- 1926–1930: Western Reserve

Administrative career (AD unless noted)
- 1929–1931: Western Reserve

Head coaching record
- Overall: 15–20–1

Accomplishments and honors

Awards
- Consensus All-American (1922); 2× First-team All-Big Ten (1921, 1922)
- College Football Hall of Fame; Inducted in 1960 (profile)

Gordon C. Locke (August 3, 1898 – November 9, 1969) was an American college football player and coach He played college football at the University of Iowa, where he was an All-American. Locke served as the head football coach at Western Reserve University—now a part of Case Western Reserve University—from 1926 to 1930, compiling a record of 15–20–1. He was inducted into the College Football Hall of Fame as a player in 1960.

== Early life and playing career ==
Locke was born in Denison, Iowa. He enrolled at University of Iowa in 1919 and played for the Hawkeye football team from 1920 to 1922. Locke, a fullback and defensive back, was the power back for the Hawkeyes while quarterback Aubrey Devine, used speed to rush to the outside. In Locke's sophomore season in 1920, Iowa started the year with a 2–2 record. Locke did not lose another game as Hawkeye.

Locke and Devine each scored two touchdowns as Iowa defeated Minnesota in 1920, 28–7. It was Iowa's third straight win over the Gophers and the first time that Minnesota had been defeated three years in a row by a single opponent.

The following year in 1921, Iowa faced Notre Dame, coached by Knute Rockne, in the second game of the season. It was Iowa's first meeting with Notre Dame. The Irish had not lost a game since 1918, a span of 20 straight wins. Locke helped move Iowa to Notre Dame's two-yard line, where it was fourth down. Duke Slater missed a rare block, and Locke was met by Notre Dame lineman Hunk Anderson. Locke powered Anderson over the goal line for Iowa's only touchdown of the game. Locke's touchdown coupled with a Devine field goal gave Iowa the 10–7 upset.

Locke's next game was his best of the 1921 season. He carried the ball 37 times and gained a school-record 202 yards rushing in a 14–2 victory over Illinois. Locke scored both Iowa touchdowns. However, he was soon hospitalized with stomach problems, which hampered his effectiveness the rest of the year. Still, Locke finished the 1921 season with over 700 rushing yards and finished second in the Big Ten Conference scoring race to teammate, Aubrey Devine. Iowa posted a perfect 7–0 record in 1921 and won its first Big Ten title in 21 years. Locke was a consensus first team All-Big Ten selection and a first team All-American in 1921.

=== 1922 season ===
Aubrey Devine, his brother Glenn, Lester Belding, and Duke Slater all graduated after the 1921 season. Locke returned to the defending Big Ten champions and was named the team captain of the 1922 Hawkeyes squad.

Team captain Gordon Locke in 1922.

Locke did not score a point in Iowa's most impressive win of the year. Iowa traveled east to play Yale, who had never lost to a team from the "West". The Hawkeyes defeated the Bulldogs, 6–0, on a touchdown run by Leland Parkin, who succeeded Devine at quarterback. Iowa's victory made headlines from coast to coast. So significant and important was the game that the Sunday Chicago Tribune bannered the front page of its general news sections with "IOWA ELEVEN SMASHES YALE."

Weary from the long train ride back to Iowa City, Iowa survived a contest with Illinois, winning 8–7. Locke scored Iowa's only touchdown in the game. The following week, he scored two touchdowns as Iowa handed Purdue a 56–0 loss, still the largest defeat in Purdue history. Locke then scored three touchdowns in the first half as Iowa defeated Minnesota for the fifth consecutive time, 28–14.

In Iowa's first-ever meeting with Ohio State, Locke rushed for 126 yards and returned three kicks for 91 yards as Iowa defeated the Buckeyes in Columbus, 12–9. He also scored both of Iowa's touchdowns. In Locke's final collegiate game against Northwestern, he scored four touchdowns for the third time in his career, leading Iowa to a 37–3 victory. The win clinched another Big Ten title and another undefeated 7–0 record for the Hawkeyes. It is the only time in school history that the Hawkeyes have won consecutive conference titles.

With Devine gone, Locke not only led Iowa in scoring with 96 points, but the 72 points scored by Locke in Big Ten play in 1922 was a conference record that stood for 21 years. Locke was not only a first team All-Big Ten selection, he was also a consensus first team All-American, the third at Iowa after his former teammates Belding and Devine.

Locke had over 400 carries in his career. Iowa had a 19–2 record in his three years with the Hawks and were on a 17-game winning streak when he graduated. The streak was snapped at 20 games in 1923, the longest winning streak in school history. Locke played for the only two undefeated and untied teams in Iowa history (1921 and 1922), and he was a first team All-American both seasons.

Locke was also an accomplished student, earning the Big Ten Medal for scholastic and athletic achievement his senior year. He also attended law school at the University of Iowa College of Law, graduating in the top three of his law school class.

== Coaching career and legal practice ==
Locke served as an assistant football coach at Iowa briefly, then moved on to Cleveland, where he was associated with a prominent law firm. He coached football at Western Reserve University in Cleveland from 1926 to 1930, compiling a 15–20–1 record, and he later served as general assistant law director for the city of Cleveland. Later, he worked in Washington, D.C., as general counsel for the Committee for Oil Pipe Lines.

== Death and honors ==
Locke died in Washington, D.C. at the age of 71. He was inducted into the Iowa Sports Hall of Fame in 1958 and the College Football Hall of Fame in 1960. In 1989, Iowa fans selected an all-time Hawkeyes football team during the 100th anniversary celebration of Iowa football, and Locke was selected to the defensive backfield. In 1999, Sports Illustrated selected Gordon Locke as the 20th greatest sports figure in the history of the state of Iowa.

== Head coaching record ==
Year	Team	Overall	Conference	Standing	Bowl/playoffs
Western Reserve Red Cats (Ohio Athletic Conference) (1926–1930)
1926	Western Reserve	3–4–1	3–4–1	14th	
1927	Western Reserve	2–6	2–5	T–15th	
1928	Western Reserve	7–1	7–1	NA	
1929	Western Reserve	3–6	3–2	T–8th	
1930	Western Reserve	0–3 (Note: Locke coached only the first three games of the season. Jack C. Davis coached the next four, and Ray G. Dauber coached the season finale.)	0–1		
Western Reserve:		15–20–1	15–13–1		
Total:		15–20–1			
