= 1922 Iowa Hawkeyes football team =

American college football season

1922 Iowa Hawkeyes football
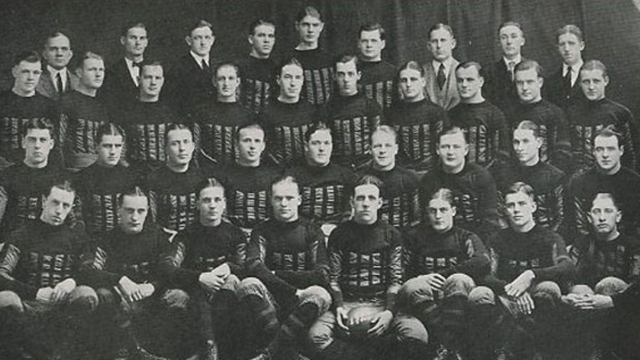

National champion (Billingsley) Big Ten co-champion
- Conference: Big Ten Conference
- Record: 7–0 (5–0 Big Ten)
- Head coach: Howard Jones (7th season)
- Offensive scheme: Single-wing
- Home stadium: Iowa Field

Uniform
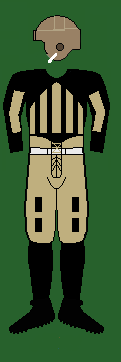

1922 Big Ten Conference football standings
	Conf.					Overall
Team	W		L		T	W		L		T
Iowa +	5	–	0	–	0	7	–	0	–	0
Michigan +	4	–	0	–	0	6	–	0	–	1
Chicago +	4	–	0	–	1	5	–	1	–	1
Wisconsin	2	–	2	–	1	4	–	2	–	1
Minnesota	2	–	3	–	1	3	–	3	–	1
Illinois	2	–	4	–	0	2	–	5	–	0
Northwestern	1	–	3	–	1	3	–	3	–	1
Ohio State	1	–	4	–	0	3	–	4	–	0
Indiana	0	–	2	–	1	1	–	4	–	2
Purdue	0	–	3	–	1	1	–	5	–	1
+ – Conference co-champions

The 1922 Iowa Hawkeyes football team was an American football team that represented the University of Iowa as a member of the Big Ten Conference during the 1922 Big Ten football season. In their seventh year under head coach Howard Jones, the Hawkeyes compiled a 7–0 record (5–0 in conference games), tied with Michigan and Chicago for the Big Ten championship, and outscored opponents by a total of 208 to 33. The Hawkeyes were retroactively selected as the 1922 national champion by the Billingsley Report. The season was part of a 20-game winning streak that began on November 6, 1920, and continued until October 20, 1923.

Iowa quarterback Gordon Locke was a consensus first-team All-American. Locke and guard Paul Minick were consensus selections for the 1922 All-Big Ten Conference football team. Other Iowa players receiving All-Big Ten recognition included center John C. Heldt, end Max Kadesky, tackle George Thompson, and guards Chester Mead and Leo Kriz.

The team played its home games at Iowa Field in Iowa City, Iowa.

== Schedule ==
Date	Opponent	Site	Result	Attendance	Source
October 7	Knox (IL)*	Iowa Field; Iowa City, IA	W 61–0	5,000	
October 14	at Yale*	Yale Bowl; New Haven, CT	W 6–0	35,000	
October 21	at Illinois	Illinois Field; Champaign, IL	W 8–7	18,784	
October 28	Purdue	Iowa Field; Iowa City, IA	W 56–0		
November 11	Minnesota^{†}	Iowa Field; Iowa City, IA (rivalry)	W 28–14	25,000	
November 18	at Ohio State	Ohio Field; Columbus, OH	W 12–9	30,000	
November 25	Northwestern	Iowa Field; Iowa City, IA	W 37–3		
*Non-conference game; ^{†}Homecoming

== Preseason ==
Howard Jones had coached the Hawkeyes to a 30–14–1 record from 1916 to 1921. The 1921 team went 7–0, and the program had a ten-game winning streak going into the 1922 season.

== Game summaries ==
=== Knox ===
Iowa opened the 1922 season on October 7 with a game against Knox College. For the second consecutive year, the Hawkeyes crushed Knox. Final score: 61–0.

=== Yale ===
On October 14, Iowa made a trip to New Haven to play Eastern powerhouse Yale. The Elis had already beaten Bates, Carnegie Tech and North Carolina by a combined score of 79–0. Yale was coached by the younger brother of Iowa coach Howard Jones, Tad Jones, who had coached the Elis to a 27–5 record from 1916 to 1917 and 1920 to 1922. Yale had an eleven-game home winning streak at the Yale Bowl. The Elis had never lost to a team from the West in fifty years of varsity football.

In the first game between Eastern and Western teams of the college football season, Iowa dominated Yale. The Hawkeyes used only twelve men to the fourteen used by the Elis. The only scoring drive of the game began late in the first quarter when Yale punted to the Hawkeyes. An Eli foul put Iowa in the territory of the opposition. Iowa quarterback Leland Parkin led the Hawkeyes down the field. On fourth down and goal from the Yale nine, Parkin ran around the right end and dove for the end zone. He came down a foot short and crawled the rest of the way. Iowa missed the extra point, but six points ended up being enough to win the game. The Elis drove inside the Hawkeye twenty twice in the second half, but the drives ended before the Elis could score. Iowa won the game, 6–0.

Yale lost to a Western team for the first time ever. The Elis did not lose to another team from the West until they fell to Michigan in 1938. The Iowa victory made front-page headlines across the nation. The headline of the Chicago Sunday Tribune ran "IOWA ELEVEN SMASHES YALE". The game was a major turning point in the battle between the East and the West for football supremacy. The use of the huddle by the Hawkeyes, an idea that was growing popular in the West, was one of the reasons Iowa was able to beat the Elis so impressively. Iowa City was home to a huge celebration on Saturday night. Seven thousand students and citizens paraded up and down the streets, shooting off rockets and dancing around bonfires. The Iowa marching band led the celebration and the crowds were compared to those who would gather in New York City on New Year's Eve.

=== Illinois ===
Iowa returned to Iowa City for a game with Illinois on October 21. It was the first Big Ten game of the season for both teams. Gordon Locke scored the only Hawkeye touchdown and a safety made the difference in an 8–7 Iowa win. The Hawkeyes had also defeated the Illini in the 1921 Big Ten opener for both teams. It was the first time Illinois had lost consecutive Big Ten openers since 1908 and 1909.

=== Purdue ===
Purdue was the opponent of Iowa on October 28. The Boilermakers had not scored a point in their previous two games, having lost to Notre Dame and Chicago by a combined score of 32–0. The Hawkeyes gave Purdue a third consecutive shutout, beating the Boilermakers 56–0. It is the worst loss in 110 years of varsity football at Purdue. Gordon Locke scored two touchdowns for Iowa.

=== Minnesota ===
Iowa played their homecoming game on November 11. William Spaulding brought his first Minnesota team to Iowa City. The Gophers had suffered their first loss of the season on November 4 to Wisconsin. The Hawkeyes handed them their second loss of the season, winning 28–14. Gordon Locke scored three touchdowns in the first half for Iowa. Heavy rain soaked Iowa Field and turned the dirt roads that led into Iowa City to mud. Hundreds of cars stalled on the road to Cedar Rapids and thousands of Hawkeye fans were stranded that night.

=== Ohio State ===
Despite being conference-mates since 1913, the first ever game between Iowa and Ohio State was played in Columbus on November 18, 1922. The Buckeyes became the first team since 1920 to lead the Hawkeyes, but Iowa beat Ohio State 12–9. Gordon Locke rushed for 126 yards and returned three kicks for 91 yards. The Hawkeye victory ensured that the Buckeyes would suffer their first losing season since 1898.

=== Northwestern ===
Iowa played their final game of the season on November 25 against Northwestern. Glenn Thistlethwaite was in his first year as the coach of the Purple. The Hawkeyes beat Northwestern 37–3 to complete a second consecutive perfect season at 7–0. Gordon Locke scored four touchdowns for Iowa to match his career record. Locke finished first in the Big Ten in scoring. His 72 points in conference games was a Big Ten record.

== Players ==
- Karl Engledinger, tackle
- John W. Hancock, end
- John C. Heldt, center
- Max Kadesky, end
- Leo J. Kriz, tackle/guard
- Gordon Locke, captain and quarterback/fullback
- Chester Mead, guard
- Glen W. Miller, fullback/halfback
- Paul Minick, guard
- C.E. Nugent, halfback
- Lowell Otte, end
- Leland Parkin, quarterback
- V.C. Shuttlesworth, halfback
- George Thompson, tackle
