= 1922 Chicago Maroons football team =

American college football season

1922 Chicago Maroons football

Big Ten co-champion
- Conference: Big Ten Conference
- Record: 5–1–1 (4–0–1 Big Ten)
- Head coach: Amos Alonzo Stagg (31st season)
- Base defense: 7–2–2
- Home stadium: Stagg Field

Uniform
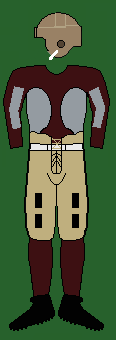

1922 Big Ten Conference football standings
	Conf.					Overall
Team	W		L		T	W		L		T
Iowa +	5	–	0	–	0	7	–	0	–	0
Michigan +	4	–	0	–	0	6	–	0	–	1
Chicago +	4	–	0	–	1	5	–	1	–	1
Wisconsin	2	–	2	–	1	4	–	2	–	1
Minnesota	2	–	3	–	1	3	–	3	–	1
Illinois	2	–	4	–	0	2	–	5	–	0
Northwestern	1	–	3	–	1	3	–	3	–	1
Ohio State	1	–	4	–	0	3	–	4	–	0
Indiana	0	–	2	–	1	1	–	4	–	2
Purdue	0	–	3	–	1	1	–	5	–	1
+ – Conference co-champions

The 1922 Chicago Maroons football team represented the University of Chicago during the 1922 Big Ten Conference football season. In Amos Alonzo Stagg's 31st year as head coach, the Maroons finished with a 5–1–1 record.

Notable players on the 1922 Chicago team included guard Joe Pondelik, fullback John Webster Thomas, halfback Jimmy Pyott, tackle Frank Gowdy, and center Ralph King. Thomas was selected by Walter Camp and the New York Tribune as a first-team All-American in 1922. Fritz Crisler was an assistant coach on the team.

== Schedule ==
Date	Opponent	Site	Result	Attendance	Source
October 7	Georgia*	Stagg Field; Chicago, IL	W 20–0	18,000	
October 14	Northwestern	Stagg Field; Chicago, IL	W 15–7		
October 21	Purdue	Stagg Field; Chicago, IL (rivalry)	W 12–0		
October 28	Princeton*	Stagg Field; Chicago, IL (first national radio broadcast)	L 18–21	31,000	
November 11	at Ohio State	Ohio Stadium; Columbus, OH	W 14–9		
November 18	Illinois	Stagg Field; Chicago, IL	W 9–0		
November 25	Wisconsin	Stagg Field; Chicago, IL	T 0–0		
*Non-conference game

== See also ==
- 1922 Princeton vs. Chicago football game
