= 1922 Princeton vs. Chicago football game =

1922 Princeton Tigers vs. Chicago Maroons football game
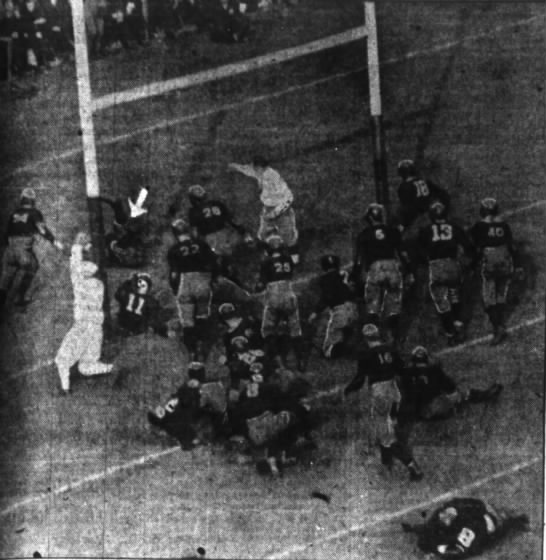
Princeton Tigers	Chicago Maroons
(4–0)	(3–0)
21	18
Head coach: Bill Roper	Head coach: Amos Alonzo Stagg
	1	2	3	4	Total
Princeton	0	7	0	14	21
Chicago	6	6	6	0	18
- Date: October 28, 1922
- Season: 1922
- Stadium: Stagg Field
- Location: Chicago, Illinois
- Referee: Vic Schwartz (Brown)
- Attendance: 31,000

The 1922 Princeton vs. Chicago football game, played October 28, 1922, was a college football game between the Princeton Tigers and University of Chicago Maroons. The "hotly contested" match-up was the first game to be broadcast nationwide on radio. Princeton's team won, 21–18. It was to be the national champion of 1922, and in this game received its nickname, "Team of Destiny", from Grantland Rice.

== First radio broadcast ==
It was the first college football game to feature an intersectional audience on radio. The game was broadcast from KYW, a Westinghouse radio station in Chicago, to WEAF, an American Telephone & Telegraph station in New York City, and from there to the rest of the country. Historian Ronald Smith has called it "probably the most important radio broadcast up to that point."

== Game summary ==
Fullback John Webster Thomas scored Chicago's three touchdowns, one in each of the first three quarters, but the team failed to score an extra point for any of them. Walter Camp wrote in picking Thomas first-team All-American: "It is safe to say he did far more against the Princeton line in effective scoring than did any backs of the East who met the Tigers".

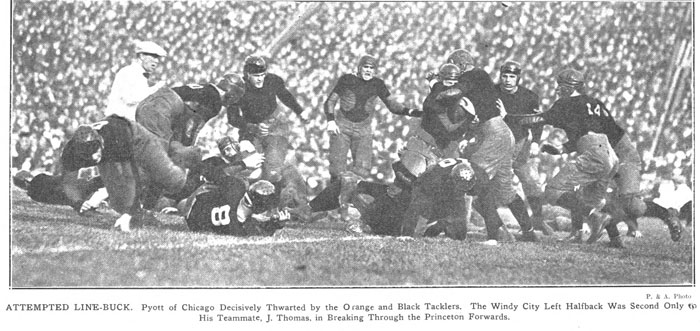
Princeton stuffs Chicago.

The Tigers had scored a single touchdown in the second quarter, and also the extra point for a total of seven; they then scored two additional touchdowns for 14 points in the final quarter to win the game, while holding Chicago scoreless. With 12 minutes to play and Chicago nursing an 18–7 lead, Howdy Gray of Princeton picked up a Jimmy Pyott fumble and ran it 40 yards for the touchdown. Gray's father, the president of the Union Pacific Railroad, reacted by waving his program in the air, striking a woman in the shoulder. After an additional Princeton touchdown was scored, Chicago responded with a fierce drive ending in a goal line stand with Thomas falling short of the goal. Halfback Harry "Maud" Crum scored Princeton's other touchdowns.

== Aftermath ==
At one point late in the game, Chicago assistant Fritz Crisler implored Amos Stagg to send in Alonzo Jr. at quarterback to call an end run. Ever the sportsman, Stagg flatly refused, citing afterwards "the rules committee deprecates the use of a substitute to convey information."

Both teams finished the contest badly exhausted, especially Princeton, as during the last half of the game the heat was oppressive. The Princeton Alumni Weekly noted: "If this game proved anything at all it proved that a fine forward passing game can defeat a fine line-plunging game."
