= James Johns =

James Johns may refer to:

- James Johns (politician) (1893–1959), Australian politician
- James Edward Johns (1900–1984), American football player
