= 1922 Wisconsin Badgers football team =

American college football season

1922 Wisconsin Badgers football
- Conference: Big Ten Conference
- Record: 4–2–1 (2–2–1 Big Ten)
- Head coach: John R. Richards (6th season)
- Captain: Rollie Williams
- Home stadium: Camp Randall Stadium

1922 Big Ten Conference football standings
	Conf.					Overall
Team	W		L		T	W		L		T
Iowa +	5	–	0	–	0	7	–	0	–	0
Michigan +	4	–	0	–	0	6	–	0	–	1
Chicago +	4	–	0	–	1	5	–	1	–	1
Wisconsin	2	–	2	–	1	4	–	2	–	1
Minnesota	2	–	3	–	1	3	–	3	–	1
Illinois	2	–	4	–	0	2	–	5	–	0
Northwestern	1	–	3	–	1	3	–	3	–	1
Ohio State	1	–	4	–	0	3	–	4	–	0
Indiana	0	–	2	–	1	1	–	4	–	2
Purdue	0	–	3	–	1	1	–	5	–	1
+ – Conference co-champions

The 1922 Wisconsin Badgers football team was an American football team that represented the University of Wisconsin in the 1922 Big Ten Conference football season. The team compiled a 4–2–1 record (2–2–1 against conference opponents), finished in fourth place in the Big Ten Conference, shut out four of seven opponents, and outscored all opponents by a combined total of 101 to 22. John R. Richards was in his sixth and final year as Wisconsin's head coach.

Quarterback Rollie Williams was the team captain. Tackle Marty Below was selected as a first-team All-American by Norman E. Brown, sports editor of the Central Press Association. Three Wisconsin players received first-team honors on the 1922 All-Big Ten Conference football team: Marty Below, Rollie Williams, and end Gus Tebell.

The team played its home games at Camp Randall Stadium, which had a seating capacity of 14,000. During the 1922 season, the average attendance at home games was 11,075.

== Schedule ==
Date	Opponent	Site	Result	Attendance	Source
October 7	Carleton*	Camp Randall Stadium; Madison, WI	W 41–0		
October 14	South Dakota State*	Camp Randall Stadium; Madison, WI	W 20–6		
October 21	Indiana	Camp Randall Stadium; Madison, WI	W 20–0		
November 4	at Minnesota	Northrop Field; Minneapolis, MN (rivalry)	W 14–0	27,000	
November 11	Illinois^{†}	Camp Randall Stadium; Madison, WI	L 0–3	28,745	
November 18	at Michigan	Ferry Field; Ann Arbor, MI	L 6–13	40,000	
November 25	at Chicago	Stagg Field; Chicago, IL	T 0–0		
*Non-conference game; ^{†}Homecoming
