= 1922 Minnesota Golden Gophers football team =

American college football season

1922 Minnesota Golden Gophers football
- Conference: Big Ten Conference
- Record: 3–3–1 (2–3–1 Big Ten)
- Head coach: William H. Spaulding (1st season)
- Captain: Oliver Aas
- Home stadium: Northrop Field

1922 Big Ten Conference football standings
	Conf.					Overall
Team	W		L		T	W		L		T
Iowa +	5	–	0	–	0	7	–	0	–	0
Michigan +	4	–	0	–	0	6	–	0	–	1
Chicago +	4	–	0	–	1	5	–	1	–	1
Wisconsin	2	–	2	–	1	4	–	2	–	1
Minnesota	2	–	3	–	1	3	–	3	–	1
Illinois	2	–	4	–	0	2	–	5	–	0
Northwestern	1	–	3	–	1	3	–	3	–	1
Ohio State	1	–	4	–	0	3	–	4	–	0
Indiana	0	–	2	–	1	1	–	4	–	2
Purdue	0	–	3	–	1	1	–	5	–	1
+ – Conference co-champions

The 1922 Minnesota Golden Gophers football team represented the University of Minnesota in the 1922 Big Ten Conference football season. In their first year under head coach William H. Spaulding, the Golden Gophers compiled a 3–3–1 record (2–3–1 against Big Ten Conference opponents) and outscored their opponents by a combined score of 79 to 65.

Halfback Earl Martineau was selected by Walter Eckersall in the Chicago Tribune, the Chicago Post, the Chicago American, and others as a first-team player on the 1922 All-Big Ten Conference football team. Center Oliver Aas was also selected as a first-team all-conference player by a number of selectors.

== Schedule ==
Date	Opponent	Site	Result	Attendance	Source
October 7	North Dakota*	Northrop Field; Minneapolis, MN	W 22–0	10,000	
October 14	vs. Indiana	Indianapolis, IN	W 20–0	10,000	
October 21	at Northwestern	Northwestern Field; Evanston, IL	T 7–7	15,000	
October 28	Ohio State	Northrop Field; Minneapolis, MN	W 9–0	25,000	
November 4	Wisconsin^{†}	Northrop Field; Minneapolis, MN (rivalry)	L 0–14	27,000	
November 11	at Iowa	Iowa Field; Iowa City, IA (rivalry)	L 14–28	25,000	
November 25	Michigan	Northrop Field; Minneapolis, MN (Little Brown Jug)	L 7–16	20,000–25,000	
*Non-conference game; ^{†}Homecoming

== Game summaries ==
=== Michigan ===
Week 7: Michigan at Minnesota

Team	1	2	3	4	Total
• Michigan	0	13	0	3	16
Minnesota	7	0	0	0	7

- Date: November 25, 1922
- Location: Northrop Field
  Minneapolis, MN
- Game attendance: 20,000

Minnesota finished its season at home against Michigan. The Wolverines won, 16–7, securing a tie with undefeated Iowa for the Big Ten championship. The 1922 Minnesota team was led by Earl Martineau, who was a first-team halfback on the New York Tribune's 1922 College Football All-America Team (and who later served as an assistant coach at Michigan from 1938–1945).

In the first quarter, Minnesota recovered a fumble at Michigan's eight-yard line, and Otis McCreary ran for a touchdown. Ray Eklund drop-kicked for the extra point, and Minnesota led, 7–0. In the second quarter, Martineau punted from his own endzone, and the ball rolled out of bounds at the Minnesota 17-yard line. Michigan drove to the one-yard line on runs by Harry Kipke and Franklin Cappon. Kipke ran it in on a sweep around Minnesota's left end for the touchdown. Paul Goebel's place-kick for the extra point was low, and Minnesota's lead was narrowed to 7–6. Late in the second quarter, Cappon dove into the endzone from the one-foot line, and Jack Blott converted the extra point from a place-kick. Michigan led 13–7 at halftime.

In the second half, Michigan held Minnesota scoreless and intercepted five of Martineau's passes (three by Kipke and two by Jackson Keefer). Michigan's final points were scored after a pass from Uteritz to Bernard Kirk took the ball to Minnesota's 17-yard line. The drive was halted, and Blott kicked a field goal from the 20-yard line.
