= 1922 Indiana Hoosiers football team =

American college football season

1922 Indiana Hoosiers football
- Conference: Big Ten Conference
- Record: 1–4–2 (0–2–1 Big Ten)
- Head coach: James P. Herron (1st season)
- Captain: Frank Hanny
- Home stadium: Jordan Field

1922 Big Ten Conference football standings
	Conf.					Overall
Team	W		L		T	W		L		T
Iowa +	5	–	0	–	0	7	–	0	–	0
Michigan +	4	–	0	–	0	6	–	0	–	1
Chicago +	4	–	0	–	1	5	–	1	–	1
Wisconsin	2	–	2	–	1	4	–	2	–	1
Minnesota	2	–	3	–	1	3	–	3	–	1
Illinois	2	–	4	–	0	2	–	5	–	0
Northwestern	1	–	3	–	1	3	–	3	–	1
Ohio State	1	–	4	–	0	3	–	4	–	0
Indiana	0	–	2	–	1	1	–	4	–	2
Purdue	0	–	3	–	1	1	–	5	–	1
+ – Conference co-champions

The 1922 Indiana Hoosiers football team represented the Indiana Hoosiers in the 1922 Big Ten Conference football season as members of the Big Ten Conference. The Hoosiers played their home games at Jordan Field in Bloomington, Indiana. The team was coached by James P. Herron, in his only year as head coach.

== Schedule ==
Date	Opponent	Site	Result	Attendance	Source
October 7	DePauw*	Jordan Field; Bloomington, IN	T 0–0	10,000	
October 14	vs. Minnesota	Indianapolis, IN	L 0–20	10,000	
October 21	at Wisconsin	Camp Randall Stadium; Madison, WI	L 0–20		
October 28	Michigan State*	Jordan Field; Bloomington, IN (rivalry)	W 14–6		
November 4	at Notre Dame*	Cartier Field; South Bend, IN	L 0–27	22,000	
November 11	West Virginia*^{†}	Jordan Field; Bloomington, IN	L 0–33	8,000	
November 25	at Purdue	Stuart Field; West Lafayette, IN (rivalry)	T 7–7		
*Non-conference game; ^{†}Homecoming
