= Rudy Rosatti =

American football player (1895–1975)

Profile
- Position: Tackle

Personal information
- Born: September 12, 1895; Norway, Michigan, U.S.
- Died: July 9, 1975 (aged 79); Norway, Michigan, U.S.

Career information
- College: Michigan, North Dakota State, Western Michigan

Career history
- 1922: Michigan
- 1923: Cleveland Indians
- 1924, 1926–27: Green Bay Packers
- 1928: New York Giants

Rudoph F. "Rudy" or "Rosy" Rosatti (September 12, 1895 – July 9, 1975) was an American football player.

Rosatti was born in 1895 at Norway in Michigan's Upper Peninsula. He attended Norway High School.

Rosatti played football at North Dakota State University and Western Michigan University before enrolling at the University of Michigan. He played tackle for the 1922 Michigan Wolverines football team.

He later played professional football for the Cleveland Indians (1923), Green Bay Packers (1924-1927), and New York Giants (1928). He appeared in a total of 45 NFL games, 40 of them as a starter.

Rosatti worked for the Michigan State Highway Department for 32 years from 1933 to 1965 and retired as the chief of highway maintenance for the western half of the Upper Peninsula. In December 1933, Rosatti fatally shot James Contratta with a rifle at a road building camp 40 mi (64 km) west of Sault Ste. Marie, Michigan. Rosatti was released after the coroner determined the shooting to have been accidental.

Rosatti died in 1975 at age 79 at his home in his hometown of Norway, Michigan.

== See also ==
- 1922 Michigan Wolverines football team
