= 1922 Ohio State Buckeyes football team =

American college football season

1922 Ohio State Buckeyes football
- Conference: Big Ten Conference
- Record: 3–4 (1–4 Big Ten)
- Head coach: John Wilce (10th season)
- Captain: Lloyd Pixley
- Home stadium: Ohio Stadium

1922 Big Ten Conference football standings
	Conf.					Overall
Team	W		L		T	W		L		T
Iowa +	5	–	0	–	0	7	–	0	–	0
Michigan +	4	–	0	–	0	6	–	0	–	1
Chicago +	4	–	0	–	1	5	–	1	–	1
Wisconsin	2	–	2	–	1	4	–	2	–	1
Minnesota	2	–	3	–	1	3	–	3	–	1
Illinois	2	–	4	–	0	2	–	5	–	0
Northwestern	1	–	3	–	1	3	–	3	–	1
Ohio State	1	–	4	–	0	3	–	4	–	0
Indiana	0	–	2	–	1	1	–	4	–	2
Purdue	0	–	3	–	1	1	–	5	–	1
+ – Conference co-champions

The 1922 Ohio State Buckeyes football team represented Ohio State University in the 1922 Big Ten Conference football season. It was the first season where the Buckeyes played in the newly built Ohio Stadium. The Buckeyes compiled a 3–4 record, only their second losing record in conference play. Ohio State was outscored 57–42 during the season.

Despite being in the Western Conference (Big Ten) together since 1913, this season had the first matchup between Ohio State and Iowa.

== Schedule ==
Date	Opponent	Site	Result	Attendance	Source
October 7	Ohio Wesleyan*	Ohio Stadium; Columbus, OH	W 5–0	25,000	
October 14	Oberlin*	Ohio Stadium; Columbus, OH	W 14–0	18,000	
October 21	Michigan	Ohio Stadium; Columbus, OH (rivalry)	L 0–19	72,000	
October 28	at Minnesota	Northrop Field; Minneapolis, MN	L 0–9	25,000	
November 11	Chicago	Ohio Stadium; Columbus, OH	L 9–14		
November 18	Iowa	Ohio Stadium; Columbus, OH	L 9–12	30,000	
November 25	at Illinois	Illinois Field; Champaign, IL ] (rivalry)	W 6–3	32,115	
*Non-conference game

== Coaching staff ==
- John Wilce, head coach, 10th year
