= Chester Mead =

American football player and coach (1900–1959)

Biographical details
- Born: February 19, 1900
- Died: February 11, 1959 (aged 58); Bakersfield, California, U.S.

Playing career
- 1920–1922: Iowa
- Position: Guard

Coaching career (HC unless noted)
- 1924–1925: Iowa Wesleyan

Head coaching record
- Overall: 6–12

Accomplishments and honors

Awards
- All-Big Ten (1922)

Chester Ira Mead (February 19, 1900 – February 11, 1959) was an American football player and coach. He served as the head football coach at Iowa Wesleyan College in Mount Pleasant, Iowa from 1924 to 1925, compiling a record of 6–12. Mead played college football at the University of Iowa from 1920 to 1922, including the undefeated 1921 and 1922 teams that won back-to-back Big Ten championships. He also coached football at Clarinda High School in Clarinda, Iowa, in 1923.

Mead later became a medial doctor and lived in Bakersfield, California. He died in 1959.

== Head coaching record ==
Year	Team	Overall	Conference	Standing	Bowl/playoffs
Iowa Wesleyan Tigers (Iowa Conference) (1924–1925)
1924	Iowa Wesleyan	3–7	1–4	T–9th	
1925	Iowa Wesleyan	3–5	1–4	11th	
Iowa Wesleyan:		6–12	2–8		
Total:		6–12			
