= James P. Herron =

American football player and coach (1894–1967)

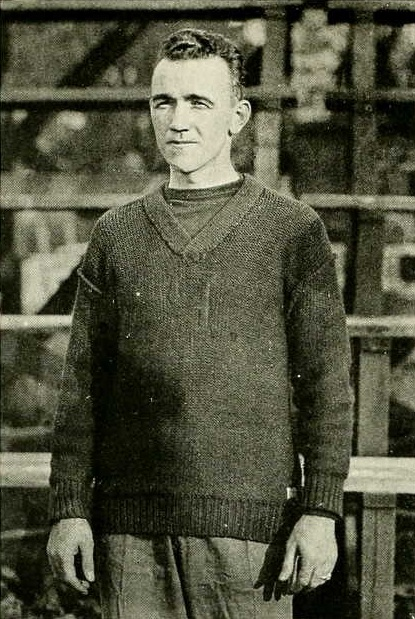
- Herron from The Arbutus, 1923

Profile
- Position: End

Personal information
- Born: August 12, 1894; New Kensington, Pennsylvania, U.S.
- Died: December 21, 1967 (aged 73) (aged 73); Monongahela, Pennsylvania, U.S.

Career information
- College: Pittsburgh

Career history

Playing
- 1919: Massillon Tigers
- 1920: Cleveland Tigers

Coaching
- 1920–1921: Pittsburgh (assistant)
- 1922: Indiana
- 1923–1924: Pittsburgh (assistant)
- 1925: Duke
- 1926–1928: Washington and Lee

Awards and highlights
- National champion (1916); Consensus All-American (1916); Second-team All-American (1915); Head coaching record: 15–24–5

Other information
- Military career
- Allegiance: United States
- Branch: U.S. Army Air Corps; U.S. Army Air Forces
- Service years: 1917–1919, 1942–1946
- Rank: Major
- Conflicts: World War I World War II

James Patrick Herron (August 12, 1894 – December 21, 1967) was an American football player and coach. He played at end for the University of Pittsburgh's football team from 1913 to 1916.

== Biography ==
A member of the Panthers' undefeated national championship teams coached by Pop Warner in 1915 and 1916, Herron earned first team All-American honors in 1916. Following graduation, Herron served as first assistant coach to Warner before being leaving to become the head coach at Indiana University Bloomington in 1922. He also served as the head coach at Duke University in 1925 and at Washington and Lee University from 1926 to 1928. Herron, who also earned a law degree, served in the aviation service during World War I and was credited for bringing down two German planes. Herron died at the age of 73 on December 20, 1967, at Monongahela Memorial Hospital in Monongahela, Pennsylvania.

He also played in one game, a start, for the Cleveland Tigers of the American Professional Football Association in 1920.

== Head coaching record ==
Year	Team	Overall	Conference	Standing	Bowl/playoffs
Indiana Hoosiers (Big Ten Conference) (1922)
1922	Indiana	1–4–2	0–2–1	9th	
Indiana:		1–4–2	0–2–1		
Duke Blue Devils (Independent) (1925)
1925	Duke	4–5			
Duke:		4–5			
Washington and Lee Generals (Southern Conference) (1926–1928)
1926	Washington and Lee	4–3–2	3–2–1	T–7th	
1927	Washington and Lee	4–4–1	2–3	T–12th	
1928	Washington and Lee	2–8	1–6	T–20th	
Washington and Lee:		10–15–3	6–11–1		
Total:		15–24–5			
