= 1922 Illinois Fighting Illini football team =

American college football season

1922 Illinois Fighting Illini football
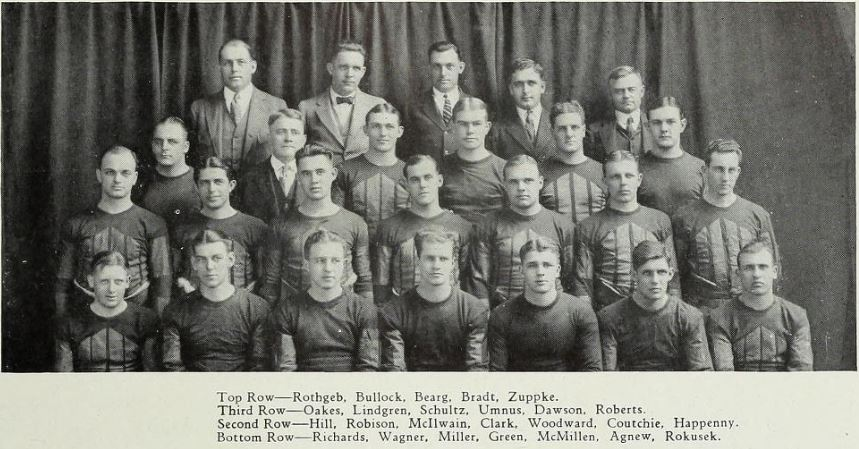
- Conference: Big Ten Conference
- Record: 2–5 (1–4 Big Ten)
- Head coach: Robert Zuppke (10th season)
- Offensive scheme: Single-wing
- Captain: David D. Wilson
- Home stadium: Illinois Field

Uniform
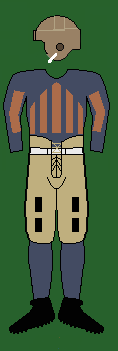

1922 Big Ten Conference football standings
	Conf.					Overall
Team	W		L		T	W		L		T
Iowa +	5	–	0	–	0	7	–	0	–	0
Michigan +	4	–	0	–	0	6	–	0	–	1
Chicago +	4	–	0	–	1	5	–	1	–	1
Wisconsin	2	–	2	–	1	4	–	2	–	1
Minnesota	2	–	3	–	1	3	–	3	–	1
Illinois	2	–	4	–	0	2	–	5	–	0
Northwestern	1	–	3	–	1	3	–	3	–	1
Ohio State	1	–	4	–	0	3	–	4	–	0
Indiana	0	–	2	–	1	1	–	4	–	2
Purdue	0	–	3	–	1	1	–	5	–	1
+ – Conference co-champions

The 1922 Illinois Fighting Illini football team was an American football team that represented the University of Illinois during the 1922 Big Ten Conference football season. In their tenth season under head coach Robert Zuppke, the Illini compiled a 2–5 record and finished in sixth place in the Big Ten Conference. End David D. Wilson was the team captain.

== Schedule ==
Date	Opponent	Site	Result	Attendance	Source
October 14	Butler	Illinois Field; Champaign, IL	L 7–10	5,350	
October 21	Iowa	Illinois Field; Champaign, IL	L 7–8	18,784	
October 28	at Michigan	Ferry Field; Ann Arbor, MI (rivalry)	L 0–24	41,560	
November 4	Northwestern	Illinois Field; Champaign, IL (rivalry)	W 6–3	14,775	
November 11	at Wisconsin	Camp Randall Stadium; Madison, WI	W 3–0	28,745	
November 18	at Chicago	Stagg Field; Chicago, IL	L 0–9	32,115	
November 25	Ohio State	Illinois Field; Champaign, IL (rivalry)	L 3–6	32,115	

== Awards and honors ==
- Jim McMillen, guard: All-American
- Roy Miller, guard: All-American
