= 1922 Purdue Boilermakers football team =

American college football season

1922 Purdue Boilermakers football
- Conference: Big Ten Conference
- Record: 1–5–1 (0–3–1 Big Ten)
- Head coach: James Phelan (1st season)
- Captain: Edgar E. Murphy
- Home stadium: Stuart Field

1922 Big Ten Conference football standings
	Conf.					Overall
Team	W		L		T	W		L		T
Iowa +	5	–	0	–	0	7	–	0	–	0
Michigan +	4	–	0	–	0	6	–	0	–	1
Chicago +	4	–	0	–	1	5	–	1	–	1
Wisconsin	2	–	2	–	1	4	–	2	–	1
Minnesota	2	–	3	–	1	3	–	3	–	1
Illinois	2	–	4	–	0	2	–	5	–	0
Northwestern	1	–	3	–	1	3	–	3	–	1
Ohio State	1	–	4	–	0	3	–	4	–	0
Indiana	0	–	2	–	1	1	–	4	–	2
Purdue	0	–	3	–	1	1	–	5	–	1
+ – Conference co-champions

The 1922 Purdue Boilermakers football team was an American football team that represented Purdue University during the 1922 Big Ten Conference football season. In their first season under head coach James Phelan, the Boilermakers compiled a 1–5–1 record, finished in last place in the Big Ten Conference with a 0–3–1 record against conference opponents, and were outscored by their opponents by a total of 126 to 36. Edgar E. Murphy was the team captain.

== Schedule ==
Date	Opponent	Site	Result	Attendance	Source
October 7	Millikin*	Stuart Field; West Lafayette, IN	W 10–0		
October 14	Notre Dame*	Stuart Field; West Lafayette, IN(rivalry)	L 0–20	9,000	
October 21	at Chicago	Stagg Field; Chicago, IL (rivalry)	L 0–12		
October 28	at Iowa	Iowa Field; Iowa City, IA	L 0–56		
November 4	Wabash*	Stuart Field; West Lafayette, IN	L 6–7		
November 11	at Northwestern	Northwestern Field; Evanston, IL	L 13–24		
November 25	Indiana^{†}	Stuart Field; West Lafayette, IN (Old Oaken Bucket)	T 7–7		
*Non-conference game; ^{†}Homecoming

== Roster ==
- Rudolph Bahr, HB
- Ralph Claypool, C
- W. L. Claypool, T
- E. R. Dye, E
- George Eversman, LH
- Tubby Fleischmann, G
- Dwight Grigsby, G
- Don Holwerda, QB
- R. D. Landis, FB
- Ray Morgan, E
- Charles Murphy, G
- Edgar Murphy, FB
- Ralph Preshaw, E
- Joey Prout, HB
- L. L. Stewart, T
- Bill Swank, G
- Freddy Tykle, LH
- Ferd. Wellman, FB
- B. V. Worth, RH
