= A. J. Sturzenegger =

American athlete and coach (1888–1949)

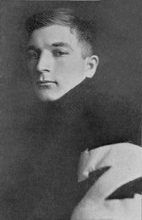
- Sturzenegger from 1910 Cornhusker

Biographical details
- Born: August 22, 1888; South Bend, Nebraska, U.S.
- Died: April 8, 1949 (aged 60); Los Angeles, California, U.S.

Playing career

Football
- 1908–1909: Nebraska
- Positions: Halfback, fullback

Coaching career (HC unless noted)

Football
- 1915: RPI
- 1920–1923: Michigan (assistant)
- 1924: USC (assistant)
- 1925–1948: UCLA (assistant)

Baseball
- 1925–1931: UCLA
- 1933: UCLA
- 1943–1945: UCLA

Head coaching record
- Overall: 1–8 (football); 71–126–3 (baseball)

Alfonzo John "Sturzy" Sturzenegger (August 22, 1888 – April 8, 1949), sometimes also referred to as Jack Sturzenegger, was an American college football and college baseball player and coach. He played football and baseball at the University of Nebraska. Sturzenegger later served as an assistant football coach at the University of Michigan (1920–1923), University of Southern California (1924), and the University of California, Los Angeles (1925–1948). He was also the head coach of the UCLA Bruins baseball team from 1927 to 1931, in 1933, and again from 1943 to 1945.

== Early years ==
He was born in South Bend, Nebraska, in 1888 and attended high school in Lincoln, Nebraska. He attended the University of Nebraska and played halfback and fullback for the 1908 and 1909 Nebraska Cornhuskers football teams. After graduating from Nebraska, Sturzenegger enrolled at Harvard Law School. He left Harvard to accept a coaching job at Rensselaer Polytechnic Institute in Troy, New York.

During World War I, he served aboard the USS Neptune as an ensign in the United States Navy. After being discharged from the Navy in 1919, Sturzenegger returned to South Bend to manage his father's store.

== Michigan ==
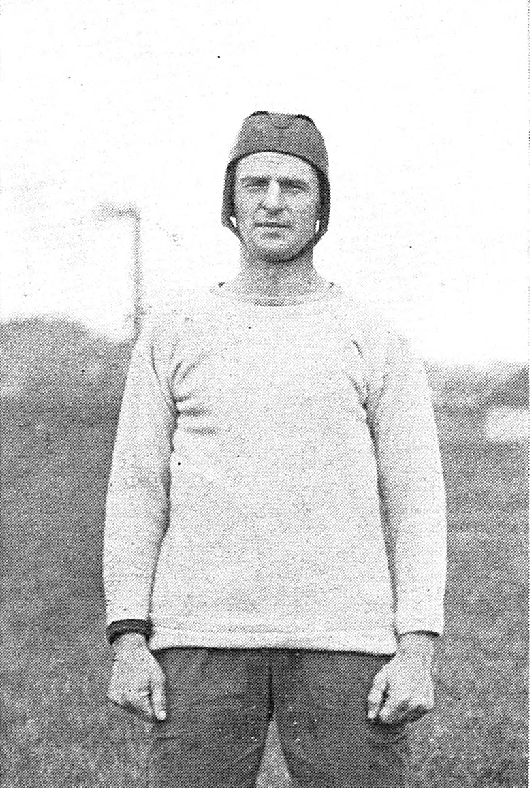
Sturzenegger at Michigan, 1921

In January 1920, he was hired as an assistant football coach under Fielding H. Yost at the University of Michigan. He was an assistant coach at Michigan from 1920 to 1923. While at Michigan, Sturzenegger served as a scout and as assistant coach responsible for the halfbacks and ends. In October 1921, a University of Michigan publication wrote that Sturznegger's "flat helmet has been a familiar sight on Ferry Field for several seasons. 'Sturz' hails from Nebraska and has an uncanny ability in imparting the fundamentals and tricks of the game to linemen and backs as well."

== USC ==
In April 1924, Sturzenegger was hired by USC as an assistant football coach. He was a resident of Los Angeles at the time of his hiring. At the time, the Los Angeles Times reported: "Coach Sturzenegger is regarded in the Middle West as the best 'scout' of football teams in the country and during his five years at Michigan was in no small degree responsible for the success of the Yost teams. He had charge of the ends and backs and was a particular success at teaching the manly art of blocking to the ends and backs. ... He is famous throughout the country for the manner in which he teaches, as he dons a football suit and personally blocks, tackles and runs with the ball, not to mention letting the boys try their stuff on him."

== UCLA ==
In September 1925, Sturzenegger was hired by UCLA as an assistant football coach under new head coach William H. Spaulding. At the time, Los Angeles Times columnist Bill Henry wrote that Spaulding had made "a fine move" in hiring "Sturzy." Henry continued: "The gentleman with the lengthy name has one of the finest of reputations in the Middle West as a developer of ends and backs and as a scout. He is a football 'nut.' He has a fine position, which he has held for a long time, with the trust department of a big local bank, but aside from his business he is chiefly interested in football. He goes to every game within reach and returns with every play of both teams accurately diagrammed. When he coaches he doesn't tell 'em he shows 'em. He puts on a uniform and gets out and rough-houses with the boys until they're glad to quit. Sturzenegger continued to serve as an assistant football coach at UCLA for more than 20 years. At the time of his death in 1949, the Los Angeles Times wrote: "Once termed the greatest scout in the game, 'Sturzy', as he was known to everyone at Westwood, became famous for his blackboard chalk talks."

In February 1927, Sturzenegger was also assigned the position as UCLA's head baseball coach. He had played baseball at Nebraska and coached it at Rennselaer Polytechnic. He remained the head coach of UCLA's baseball team from 1927 to 1931, in 1933, and again from 1943 to 1945.

In October 1929, Sturzenegger added responsibilities as UCLA's assistant graduate manager.

In November 1938, Sturzenegger fell gravely ill with pneumonia while traveling with the football team to play Washington State College in Pullman, Washington. Eleven ounces of pneumonia serum were flown from Burbank, California, to Oakland, California, to meet the special train carrying Sturzenegger back to Los Angeles. He was hospitalized for several days at Hollywood Hospital after the team returned to Los Angeles and made a full recovery.

== Death and family ==
Sturzenegger died in April 1949. He was survived by his wife Alice Calhoun Sturzenegger and daughters June Sturzengger Rhea and Joann Sturzenegger. After he died, students replaced UCLA's Victory Flag with a new one dedicated to "Sturzy."
