= 1922 Northwestern Purple football team =

American college football season

1922 Northwestern Purple football
- Conference: Big Ten Conference
- Record: 3–3–1 (1–3–1 Big Ten)
- Head coach: Glenn Thistlethwaite (1st season)
- Captain: James Patterson
- Home stadium: Northwestern Field

1922 Big Ten Conference football standings
	Conf.					Overall
Team	W		L		T	W		L		T
Iowa +	5	–	0	–	0	7	–	0	–	0
Michigan +	4	–	0	–	0	6	–	0	–	1
Chicago +	4	–	0	–	1	5	–	1	–	1
Wisconsin	2	–	2	–	1	4	–	2	–	1
Minnesota	2	–	3	–	1	3	–	3	–	1
Illinois	2	–	4	–	0	2	–	5	–	0
Northwestern	1	–	3	–	1	3	–	3	–	1
Ohio State	1	–	4	–	0	3	–	4	–	0
Indiana	0	–	2	–	1	1	–	4	–	2
Purdue	0	–	3	–	1	1	–	5	–	1
+ – Conference co-champions

The 1922 Northwestern Purple team represented Northwestern University during the 1922 Big Ten Conference football season. In their first year under head coach Glenn Thistlethwaite, the Purple compiled a 3–3–1 record (1–3–1 against Big Ten Conference opponents) and finished in seventh place in the Big Ten Conference.

== Schedule ==
Date	Opponent	Site	Result	Attendance	Source
October 7	Beloit*	Northwestern Field; Evanston, IL	W 17–0		
October 15	at Chicago	Stagg Field; Chicago, IL	L 7–15		
October 21	Minnesota	Northwestern Field; Evanston, IL	T 7–7		
November 4	at Illinois	Illinois Field; Champaign, IL (rivalry)	L 3–6		
November 11	Purdue	Northwestern Field; Evanston, IL	W 24–13		
November 18	Monmouth (IL)*	Northwestern Field; Evanston, IL	W 58–14		
November 25	at Iowa	Iowa Field; Iowa City, IA	L 3–37		
*Non-conference game
