= Doug Roby =

American athlete and official

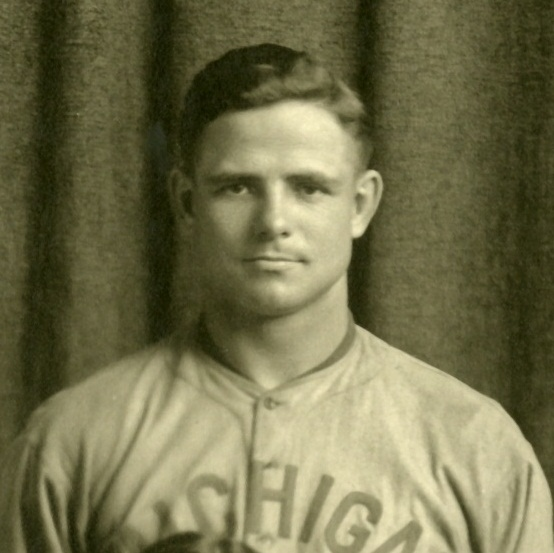

President of the United States Olympic Committee
- In office 1965–1968
- Preceded by: Kenneth L. Wilson
- Succeeded by: Franklin Orth

Member of the International Olympic Committee
- In office 1952–1984

Personal details
- Born: March 4, 1898 Port Tobacco, Maryland, US
- Died: March 31, 1992 (aged 94) Ann Arbor, Michigan, US
- Education: University of Michigan
- Occupation: Automotive parts manufacturer

Douglas Fergusson Roby (March 24, 1898 – March 31, 1992) was an American sportsman and Olympics official. After playing football at Phillips University and the University of Michigan, he worked for American Metal Products Company, an automobile parts manufacturer, from 1923 to 1963. From 1951 to 1953, he was the president of the Amateur Athletic Union, then America's governing body for many amateur sports. He was vice president (1953–65) and president (1965–68) of the United States Olympic Committee and one of two American members of the International Olympic Committee (1952–84). As president of the USOC during the 1968 Summer Olympics, he expelled African-American athletes Tommie Smith and John Carlos after their raised-fist Black Power salute during a medal ceremony.

== Early years ==
Roby was born in Port Tobacco, Maryland, and grew up in Chicago, Illinois where he attended Wendell Phillips High School. In 1916 he received a scholarship to the Michigan Military Academy at Brighton, Michigan, where he helped the football team to an undefeated season that fall.

== Phillips University ==
While attending the academy, Roby became friends with John Maulbetsch, a star halfback at the University of Michigan. After graduating, Maulbetsch accepted the head football coaching job at Phillips University in Enid, Oklahoma. Phillips was a small, private school without a well-known athletic program. Roby was Maulbetsch's first recruit to play at Phillips. With Roby as team captain and future Pro Football Hall of Famer Steve Owen also on the team, Phillips lost only one game in 1918 and 1919, including a 10–0–1 record in 1919. The Phillips "Haymakers" defeated Oklahoma and the Texas Longhorns, gaining a reputation as "one of the strongest teams in the southwest." When Phillips defeated Texas 10-0 in Austin, Texas in October 1919, the Longhorns had not lost a game since 1917. One Texas newspaper reported that Phillips had "whitewashed the Longhorns in their own corral."

== University of Michigan ==
In February 1920, Roby transferred to the University of Michigan, where he worked his way through college by racking balls in a billiards parlor six hours a day. He played for the Michigan Wolverines in 1921 and 1922 both as a left fielder in baseball and a fullback in football. He graduated in a degree in business administration in 1923.

== Professional football and squash ==
Roby played professional football for one year with the Cleveland Indians in 1923. Roby was the starting tailback in all seven games for the Indians in 1923, scoring one touchdown and also kicking an extra point. Statistics are not available for his yardage gained. He later played squash for the Detroit team from 1928–1936, winning the national championship in 1932.

== American Metal Products Company ==
Roby joined the American Metal Products Company, a Detroit-based automotive parts manufacturer in 1926, and retired as board chairman in 1963. Roby was the company's president in 1958 when a furnace being used to temper automobile seat springs exploded, collapsing the roof of the company's three-block-long plant, causing injury to several workers.

== Amateur athletics official ==
Roby began a fifty-year career as an athletic official by serving several terms on the University of Michigan's Board in Control of Athletics. From 1951 to 1953, he was the president of the U.S. Amateur Athletic Union, then America's governing body for many amateur sports. And in 1952, he was selected to serve on the International Olympic Committee and was one of two American members on the IOC from 1952-1984. He also served as vice president of the United States Olympic Committee from 1953–1965 and as the president of the USOC from 1965-1968. Roby was also elected as the third president of the Pan American Sports Organisation for the 1955-1959 term.

=== Detroit's Olympic bids ===
From 1939 through the 1960s, Roby sought to bring the Olympics to Detroit. When Detroit was selected over Los Angeles as the USOC's proposed site for the 1968 Summer Olympics, IOC member John Garland from California declined to support the American bid. Roby noted: "John Garland of California -- I doubt if he will support us. He was quite hurt that Detroit prevailed over Los Angeles in the competition before the American Olympic Committee for the right to bid for the games. But I don't think that will hurt us. On the contrary, the propaganda by people in California against us might help because it has been unsportsmanlike." Mexico City ultimately proceeded to win the right to host the 1968 Games.

=== Leadership at the 1968 Olympics ===
During the 1968 Olympics as the president of the USOC, Roby took disciplinary action against members of the U.S Olympic delegation due to their participation in an act of political protest during the 1968 Summer Olympics in Mexico City. The protest involved African-American athletes Tommie Smith and John Carlos, who raised black-gloved fists and bowed their heads while "The Star-Spangled Banner" was played during a medal ceremony. Initially inclined not to take action against Smith and Carlos, Roby faced considerable pressure from the International Olympic Committee and ultimately ordered the two to be removed from the Olympic village and sent home, though he did not strip them of their medals. Roby had called the USOC executive board into session immediately after the protest; they issued a two-page statement apologizing to the IOC and the Mexican hosts for the act, saying no action was planned but hinting that no further demonstrations would be tolerated. Hours later, the USOC was asked to withdraw its statement. Roby explained, "At 6 p.m. I had a call from the IOC to meet with them at 9 p.m. When I got there, I found the committee was adamant that severe action be taken against the offending athletes. I told them our committee was undecided. I asked, 'What if we do nothing?' They told me quite firmly that if the United States found that it could not control its athletes, then the IOC might be forced to firm action. I was led to believe that there was a threat of throwing out the entire U.S. team." Other accounts have confirmed that the USOC refused to ban the two but gave in when the IOC threatened to expel the entire US track team. The USOC went back into session after midnight and ordered the removal of Smith and Carlos. Roby later defended the decision in an interview with The New York Times, saying:

We suppressed the demonstrators because we felt if we let it go it would get progressively worse, it would become a tip-off to others, white as well as black. We let a lot of things go by—berets, black socks, hands up and down—even though there are specific rules against changes in uniform in the competitor's handbook. But we felt that would be flyspecking. But we couldn't let a flagrant demonstration go by. We considered that we might have a boycott on our hands but we had to take the chance.

At the 1968 Olympics, Roby also condemned members of the rowing team from Harvard that publicly endorsed the demonstrations. Roby sent a letter to Harvard’s coach criticizing his alleged involvement. Roby wrote:

At one point, I personally was in favor of disqualifying you and your crew for acts grossly unbecoming to members of our Olympic team. I am now glad I did not encourage such a harsh action for I feel that the miserable performance of you and your crew at Mexico City will stand as a permanent record against you and the athletes which you led. As a boy I had great admiration and respect for Harvard and the men it produced. Certainly serious intellectual degeneration has taken place in this once great University if you and several members of your crew are examples of the type of men that are within its walls.

=== Controversies over China and South Africa ===
In 1979, Roby voted against the readmission of China to the Olympics, but China prevailed by a vote of 62-17. In 1984, he advocated the readmission of apartheid-era South Africa to the Olympics. Roby resigned from the IOC in 1985 and retired from the USOC in 1986.

== Death ==
Roby died of heart failure at a nursing home in Ann Arbor. He was 94 years old at the time of his death in 1992, making him the oldest living U-M letterman. He was survived by a son, Douglas F. Roby Jr., two daughters, Hermine Roby Klingler, and Ruth Roby Glancy.

== See also ==
- University of Michigan Athletic Hall of Honor
- 1968 Olympics Black Power salute
