= Jackson Keefer =

American football player (1900–1966)

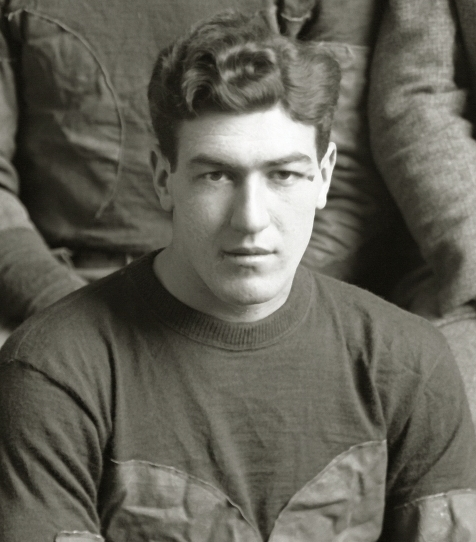

Profile
- Positions: Halfback, fullback

Personal information
- Born: May 1, 1900; Olney, Illinois, U.S.
- Died: August 3, 1966 (aged 66); Dayton, Ohio, U.S.

Career information
- College: Michigan, Brown

Career history
- 1922: Michigan
- 1924–1925: Brown
- 1926: Providence Steam Roller
- 1928: Dayton Triangles

Awards and highlights
- 2× Third-team All-American (1924, 1925); Second-team All-Eastern (1925)

Jackson Milliman Keefer (May 1, 1900 – August 3, 1966) was an American professional football and baseball player.

== Playing history ==
Keefer attended Steele High School in Dayton, Ohio before enrolling at the University of Michigan. He played halfback for the Michigan Wolverines football team in 1922. Keefer was determined to be ineligible in the fall of 1923 and transferred to Brown University. While playing for Brown, he was selected as a third-team All-American in 1924 by Walter Camp and in 1925 by the Associated Press, Walter Camp and Walter Eckersall. He later played professional football for the Providence Steam Roller in 1926 and the Dayton Triangles in 1928. Keefer also played professional baseball for Springfield in the Eastern League in 1927. Keefer was inducted into the Brown University Athletic Hall of Fame in 1971, and in 2003 was selected as one of four backs on the 125th Anniversary All-Time Brown Football Team. Keefer died in 1966 at age 66 at a Veterans Administration hospital in Dayton, Ohio.
