= James Edward Johns =

American football player (1900–1984)

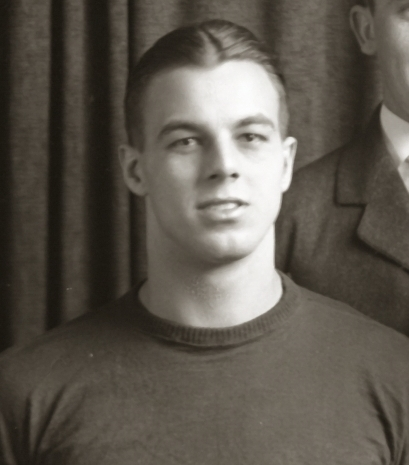

Profile
- Positions: Guard, Tackle

Personal information
- Born: February 22, 1900
- Died: December 1984 (aged 84)

Career information
- College: Michigan

Career history
- 1920–1922: Michigan
- 1923: Cleveland Indians
- 1924: Minnesota Marines

James Edward "Ed" Johns (February 22, 1900 – December 1984) was an American football player. Johns attended Central High School in Lansing, Michigan. He was the center on the 1918 Lansing football team that was selected in 1952 as Michigan's all-time greatest high school football team. The 1918 Lansing team defeated Owosso 81-0, Battle Creek 85-0, Grand Rapids South 59-0, and Jackson 96-0. Matched against the Michigan Aggies, now known as the Michigan State Spartans, Lansing won by a score of 40-0. Three players from the 1918 Lansing team, Harry Kipke, Ed Vandervoort, and Johns went on to play for Fielding H. Yost's Michigan Wolverines football teams. Johns enrolled at the University of Michigan in 1919 and played on the freshman football team. He played guard and tackle for the Wolverines varsity football teams from 1920 to 1922. Johns later played professional football for the Cleveland Indians in 1923 and Minnesota Marines in 1924. Johns died in 1984 at age 84 while living in Columbus, Ohio.
