= John Webster Thomas =

American football player and coach (1900–1977)

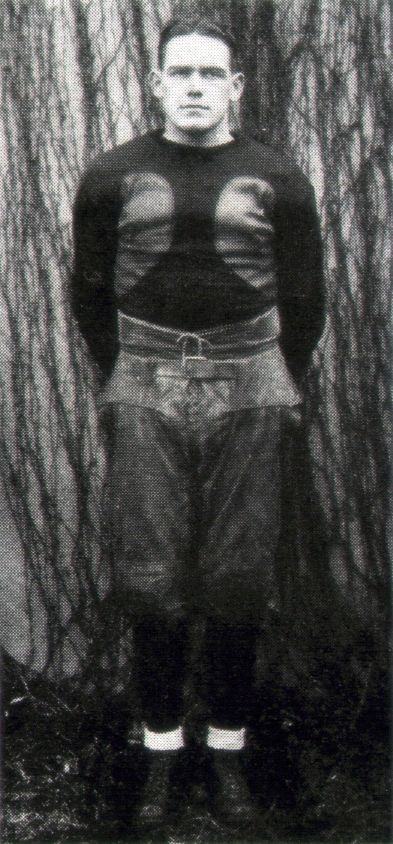
- Thomas, 1923

Biographical details
- Born: February 13, 1900; Ocheyedan, Iowa, U.S.
- Died: August 19, 1977 (aged 77); Woodstock, Illinois, U.S.

Playing career
- 1919–1920: Jamestown
- 1921–1923: Chicago
- 1924: Racine Legion
- Position: Fullback

Coaching career (HC unless noted)
- 1924–1926: Danville HS (IL)
- 1927–1928: Haskell

Head coaching record
- Overall: 10–8–1 (college football)

Accomplishments and honors

Awards
- Consensus All-American (1922); All-Big Ten (1921, 1922, 1923)

John Webster Thomas (February 13, 1900 – August 19, 1977) was an American football player and coach. He played college football as a fullback at the University of Chicago from 1921 to 1923 under Amos Alonzo Stagg. Thomas served as the head football coach at the Haskell Institute—now known as Haskell Indian Nations University—from 1928 to 1928, compiling a record of 10–8–1.

== Playing career ==
Prior to 1919 he enlisted in the United States Army Air Service in World War I. In 1919 and 1920 he played for Jamestown College in North Dakota and was chosen All-State fullback both years.

In 1921 he transferred to the University of Chicago under Amos Alonzo Stagg as a sophomore. He wore numbers 2 and 5. In 1921 he was picked by many writers to their All-Big Ten Conference team citing him as the driving force behind the Chicago road victory (9–0) over Princeton that year. That game was the first Western triumph over an Eastern powerhouse and was a primary stimulus in college football becoming a national game.

In 1922, Walter Camp picked him as his 1st team Fullback in his Junior year. Of Thomas, Camp wrote:

"John Thomas of Chicago has that rare art of carrying through his charge with his feet still under him, ready for a further drive. When he strikes, he strikes hard, but he has still a later thrust of power so that the ordinary check in a line does not stop his forward progress. He would be the most dashing of the three in this All-American backfield (*). His work shone in other games but it was particularly brilliant in the Princeton game. It is safe to say he did far more against the Princeton line in effective

scoring than did any backs of the East who met the Tigers."

(*) Camp refers to his 1922 backfield selections: Thomas, Eddie Kaw of Cornell, and Harry Kipke of Michigan.

In 1923 Stagg held Thomas out of the first games due to a summertime appendicitis operation. Despite his operation, Thomas had another solid year. He was named All-Big Ten Conference alongside Red Grange by both the Chicago American and the Chicago Tribune. In 1923, he was elected class president of the University of Chicago.

In his years with the Maroons, they were 18–3–1 (6–1, 5–1–1, 7–1). These three losses were by a total of 17 points. The first in 1921 was to Ohio State by a score of 7–0 after returning from their triumph over the Tigers at Princeton. The second was a home loss at Stagg Field to the 1922 Princeton Tigers football team (record 8–0) due to three missed extra points. The three touchdowns were all scored by Thomas, who fell two feet short at the goal line on his fourth attempt with time expiring. This was Princeton's closest game of the season (21–18) and was the first football game ever broadcast on radio. It marked the first time an Eastern powerhouse had journeyed West. It is also listed by some as one of the greatest sports moments in history.

The third was a 7–0 road loss in 1923 to Illini (record 8–0) led by Red Grange, the fewest points allowed to the Illini that year. This game was the first game played at the Illinois (uncompleted) Memorial Stadium. Prior to the game, John's brother Harry Thomas had been declared ineligible, so Stagg played John at halfback, which Stagg later wrote cost Chicago the game and possible conference championship. During Thomas's tenure with the Maroons, they outscored their opponents 333 to 72, allowing their opponents into double digits only once (1922 Princeton). Comparatively, the three years before, (1918–1920), the Maroons were 8–12. The three years after (1924–1926) they were 9–11–4.

During 1922 and 1923 he played with his brother Harry Thomas in the University of Chicago backfield. Harry was named All-Big Ten in 1924. In addition to Harry, he had two other younger brothers, Lloyd Thomas and Max Thomas, who played in the backfield for USC from 1926 to 1928. Lloyd was a member of the 1928 USC National Championship team, 2nd Team NEA All-American, Associated Press All-Pacific Coast Team, and winner of the 1928 USC Davis-Teschke Award.

He went on to sneak in two professional games for the Racine Legion in 1924 under the alias "John Webster" because his wife Mildred (née Whipple) had asked him to give up the game.

== Coaching career ==
In September 1924, Thomas took over the reins of the sports program at Danville High School in Danville, Illinois, the year the community built its new state-of-the art high school. In his three years as Danville High School's football coach, the former All-American coached his teams to undefeated seasons in the falls of 1924 and 1925. In the fall of 1926, his Danville High School Maroons compiled a record of 2–5–2. Thomas also coached basketball and track during his tenure at Danville High School with his track team winning the state championship in 1925. From 1924 to 1927, he taught physical education at the school.

From 1927 to 1929 he coached at what was then known as the Haskell Indian Institute in Lawrence, Kansas with John Levi.

== Later life ==
Thomas worked for the American Red Cross, Cummins Business Machine of Chicago, along with many other jobs later in life. He died in 1977 and is buried in Woodstock, Illinois.

== Head coaching record ==
=== College football ===
Year	Team	Overall	Conference	Standing	Bowl/playoffs
Haskell Indians (Independent) (1927–1928)
1927	Haskell	5–3–1			
1928	Haskell	5–5			
Haskell:		10–8–1			
Total:		10–8–1			
