= Dan McGugin =

American football player, coach, and lawyer (1879–1936)

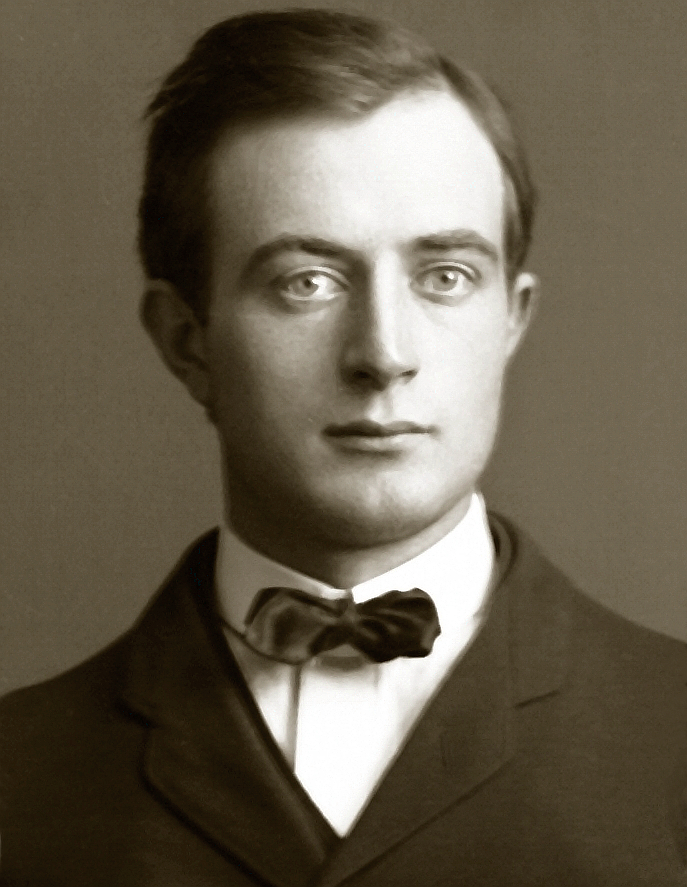
- McGugin cropped from 1903 Michigan Wolverines team photograph

Biographical details
- Born: July 29, 1879 near Tingley, Iowa, U.S.
- Died: January 23, 1936 (aged 56); Memphis, Tennessee, U.S.

Playing career
- 1898–1900: Drake
- 1901–1902: Michigan
- Positions: Guard, tackle, punter

Coaching career (HC unless noted)
- 1903: Michigan (assistant)
- 1904–1917: Vanderbilt
- 1919–1934: Vanderbilt

Administrative career (AD unless noted)
- 1934–1936: Vanderbilt

Head coaching record
- Overall: 197–55–19

Accomplishments and honors

Championships
- 9 SIAA (1904–1907, 1910–1912, 1915, 1921); 2 SoCon (1922–1923)

Awards
- First-team All-Western (1902)
- College Football Hall of Fame; Inducted in 1951 (profile)

Daniel Earle McGugin (July 29, 1879 – January 23, 1936) was an American college football player and coach, as well as a lawyer. He served as the head football coach at Vanderbilt University in Nashville, Tennessee from 1904 to 1917 and again from 1919 to 1934, compiling a record of 197–55–19. He is the winningest head coach in the history of the university. McGugin was inducted into the College Football Hall of Fame as a coach in 1951 as part of its inaugural class. The Vanderbilt athletics office building, the McGugin Center, bears his name.

McGugin played football for Drake and for the "Point-a-Minute" Michigan teams. He was the brother-in-law of University of Michigan coach Fielding H. Yost.

== Early years ==
McGugin was born in July 1879 on a farm near Tingley, Iowa. He was the son of Benjamin Franklin McGugin and Melissa (Critchfield) McGugin. He was of Scottish and Irish descent. He attended Tingley High School, class of 1895. He was classmates with the parents of painter Jackson Pollock, and with Ralph Tidrick, a missionary killed by a lion in Sudan.

McGugin saw the baton twirling skills of W. W. Wharton in Tingley for a Sunday evening church service one day in 1896 and was intrigued. Wharton, Drake University's first football coach, suggested he play football instead. "Come to Drake University", Wharton suggested, "and we'll make you as fine a tackle as there is."

=== Drake ===
McGugin enrolled at Drake University and received a Bachelor of Arts degree in 1901. He played football at Drake for two years at the guard and tackle positions and "was considered one of the best players that Drake ever had." After one victory he purchased a small brass cannon and fired it at regular fifteen-minute intervals, nodding politely to neighbors' Sabbath complaints and merrily blasting away.

=== Michigan ===
After graduating from Drake, McGugin enrolled in law school at the University of Michigan. While there, McGugin played college football for Fielding H. Yost. He was a player on Michigan's "Point-a-Minute" teams that outscored their opponents, 1,211 to 12 in 1901 and 1902, and served as Yost's assistant coach at Michigan in 1903. He was selected All-Western in 1902. A profile of McGugin in the 1903 University of Michigan yearbook noted

McGugin is the lightest guard that Michigan has had in the last ten years, but he has not met his match during the past two seasons. ... As a guard he is careful yet nervy. He gets the jump on his opponents and keeps the advantage. Although a hard player he goes into each scrimmage with as much composure as if he were walking along the campus. McGugin, although good in every department of his position, has two qualities that are pre-eminent: namely, making interference and opening holes. [Willie] Heston has been especially fortunate this year in having a good interference, and part of that interference has been McGugin.

=== Marriage ===
McGugin was married to Virginia Louise Fite on December 6, 1905, in Detroit, Michigan. His former coach, Fielding Yost, was married to Eunice Fite, making McGugin and Yost brothers-in-law. Yost was best man at McGugin's wedding.

== Vanderbilt ==
After the last game of the 1902 season, Vanderbilt head coach Walter H. Watkins announced his resignation. Vanderbilt made an effort to secure the services of McGugin's teammate at Michigan, Neil Snow, who was the University of Nashville (Peabody) football coach. Snow resigned from Nashville never to coach again, accepting a construction position in New York. Vanderbilt was then coached by James H. Henry for one season in 1903.

In 1904, McGugin wrote to Vanderbilt University asking for its head coaching position, and was hired at a salary of $850 per year plus board. McGugin had also written to Western Reserve, and was prepared to accept the job there when he received the telegram saying he received the Vanderbilt job. Despite Western Reserve offering $1,000, McGugin preferred the chance to see the South. (Note: The same season, Auburn hired Mike Donahue and Georgia Tech hired John Heisman.)

McGugin remained the head football coach for the Vanderbilt Commodores from 1904 to 1917 and from 1919 to 1934. During his tenures, the Vanderbilt Commodores compiled a 197–55–19 record, had a .762 winning percentage, and won 11 conference titles. He had numerous intersectional triumphs: defeating the Carlisle Indians in 1906, and tying the Navy Midshipmen in 1907, the Yale Bulldogs in 1910, and the Michigan Wolverines in 1922. The Vanderbilt athletics office building, the McGugin Center, bears his name. McGugin was also named to the Vanderbilt Athletics Hall of Fame as part of its inaugural class.

=== 1904–1907: first string of titles ===
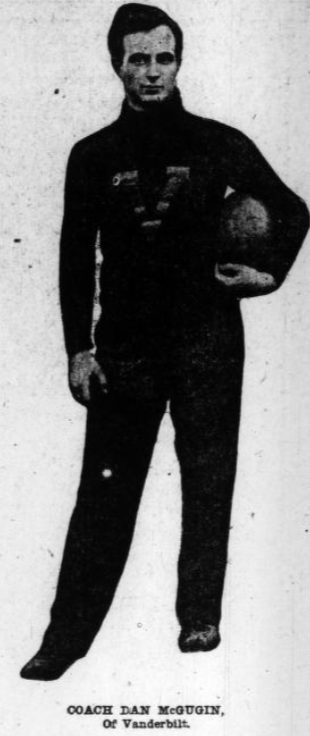
McGugin, c. 1906

McGugin used his mentor Yost's short punt formation. In his first career game, McGugin's team defeated Mississippi A&M, 61–0. He went on to win his next two games by 60 points as well, against Georgetown 66–0 and against Mississippi 69–0. "The whole South read that 69–0 score and gasped." He remains the only coach in NCAA history to win his first three games by 60 points. He also won each of his first 11 games by more than 20 points. Vanderbilt outscored their opponents 474–4 during his first year. The 1905 team suffered its only loss to McGugin's former team, Michigan. Vanderbilt crushed a strong Sewanee squad 68–4. One publication claims "The first scouting done in the South was in 1905, when Dan McGugin and Captain Innis Brown, of Vanderbilt went to Atlanta to see Sewanee play Georgia Tech."

In 1906 (the first year of the legal forward pass and onside kick) his team defeated Carlisle, had a third-team Walter Camp All-American in Owsley Manier (the South's first), and were for some writers the entire All-Southern eleven. McGugin had his team practice the pass by playing baseball with a football.

The next season Vanderbilt tied Navy and met rival Sewanee, in a battle of the unbeaten for the mythical crown of the South, and won using a trick double-pass play. Sewanee led 12–11 with twelve minutes to play. At McGugin's signal, the Commodores went into a freakish formation in which Stein Stone remained at center but all the other players shifted to his left. Quarterback Hugh Potts took the snap and lateraled the ball to Vaughn Blake, who lateraled it across to Bob Blake, who had lined up deep in punt formation, as Stone ran down the field. Blake completed a 35-yard pass to Stone who was inside the 5-yard line. Honus Craig ran it in to win the game. It was cited by journalist Grantland Rice as the greatest thrill he ever witnessed in his years of watching sports.

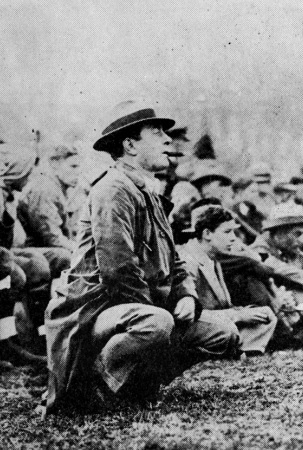
McGugin on the sidelines

=== 1908–1909 ===
At the end of the 1907 season, there was some worry Yost might retire at Michigan, and McGugin would replace him. Instead, McGugin signed a five-year contract with Vanderbilt, and established his law practice in town.

The 1908 squad was hampered by a wealth of sophomores which McGugin, with the help of halfback Ray Morrison, led to a 7–2–1 record. The 1909 team lost to Ohio State and Sewanee.

=== 1910–1912: second string of titles ===
In 1910, Vanderbilt's only blemish was fighting defending national champion Yale to a scoreless tie. Team captain Bill Neely, recalling the tie with Yale said: "The score tells the story a good deal better than I can. All I want to say is that I never saw a football team fight any harder at every point than Vanderbilt fought today – line, ends, and backfield. We went in to give Yale the best we had and I think we about did it." The team was led by third-team Walter Camp All-American guard Will Metzger, and piloted by Morrison.

The Atlanta Constitution voted the 1911 team's backfield the best in the South. It consisted of: Lew Hardage, Wilson Collins, Ammie Sikes, and Ray Morrison. The team's only blemish was a one-point loss to Michigan. The 1912 team led the nation in scoring by margin of victory and lost only to national champion Harvard, though it did suffer a tie with Auburn, the next season's SIAA champion.

=== 1913–1914 ===
The 1913 team went 5–3, losing to Michigan, Virginia, and Auburn, including McGugin's worst loss to Michigan, 33–2. Michigan used several forward passes. 1914 was McGugin's first and only losing season.

=== 1915: "point-a-minute" team ===
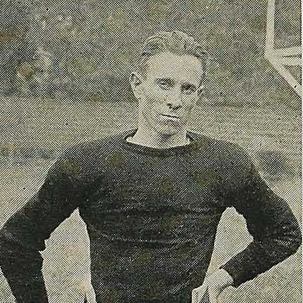
Rabbit Curry (pictured)

After his first losing season, McGugin had only ten players with experience returning. Despite this, McGugin's 1915 team bore the moniker "point-a-minute" like his old teams at Michigan, scoring 514 points in 510 minutes of play. The team was built around 130 pound junior quarterback Irby "Rabbit" Curry. In the line was sophomore tackle Josh Cody, who made Walter Camp's third-team All-America.

=== 1916–1917 ===
In 1916, Vanderbilt was upset by rival Tennessee for its only loss, and the team beat Virginia for the first time. Curry was selected third-team All-America by Walter Camp. The 1917 season featured Vanderbilt's worst-ever loss, 83–0 to Georgia Tech. McGugin never stopped keeping his men "up." Before the Alabama game the following week, he shouted to reserve fullback Top Richardson to "hit hard on every play." "Yes, sir!" Richardson replied, "I'll knock hell out of anyone who comes near this bench!"

=== 1918: Poor Little Rabbit ===
McGugin took time off from coaching to work in the mining business during the First World War. On a draft registration card completed in 1918, McGugin stated that he was the president of the Kensee Mining Company in Marion, Kentucky. On August 10, 1918, while on protection patrol, Rabbit Curry was killed in an aerial combat over Perles, France. After learning about Curry's death McGugin wired this telegram to The Tennessean

During the four years of my intimate association with Irby Curry, I never heard him utter a word his mother might not hear and approve. A game sportsman and scholar, truly he was gentle as a dove. He had a lion's heart, and now a hero's death. Poor Little Rabbit! How he pulls at the heart-strings of all of us who knew him and therefore honored and loved him tenderly.

For many years after Curry's death, McGugin had three photographs displayed over his desk. The three pictures were of Abraham Lincoln, Robert E. Lee, and Curry. McGugin read military history, and before a tough game enjoyed reading about Lee's strategies.

=== 1919–1920 ===
In 1919, McGugin and Cody returned from WWI. Vanderbilt tied Tennessee, in the rain, and Kentucky, and lost to Georgia Tech and Buck Flowers in the mud. Vanderbilt also beat the SIAA champion, Auburn. Sportswriter Fuzzy Woodruff recalls the confusion in selecting a 1919 champion: "Auburn claimed it. "We defeated Tech" said Auburn. "Yes, but we defeated you" said Vanderbilt. "Yes", said Alabama, "but Tech, Tulane, and Tennessee took your measure. We defeated Georgia Tech, who tied Tulane, so we are champions...The newspapers, however, more or less generally supported the claim of Auburn..." Cody again made Camp's third-team All-America.

The 1920 team lost to Alabama 14–7, and suffered big losses to Georgia Tech and Auburn, 44–0 and 56–6 respectively. Fred Russell's Fifty Years of Vanderbilt Football gives the year of 1920 the title "One of Most Difficult Schedules."

=== 1921–1923: last string of titles ===
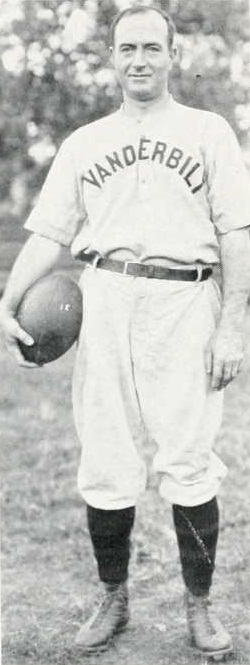
McGugin, c. 1921

In 1921, the Commodores hired Wallace Wade as an assistant and posted an undefeated, 7–0–1 record. "The Texas game, sparked by McGugin's unforgettable oratory, was the big one." "Instead of hammering detailed strategy into them," coach Dan McGugin had taken his team to the nearby grave of former Vanderbilt quarterback Curry in Marlin, Texas. In a noted speech just before the teams took to the field, referring to this grave, McGugin tapped his fingers on the floor and began:

You are about to be put to an ordeal which will show the stuff that's in you! What a glorious chance you have! Every one of you is going to fix his status for all time in the minds and hearts of his teammates today. How you fight is what you will be remembered by. If any shirk, the Lord pity him. He will be degraded in the hearts of the rest as long as they live...

Vanderbilt went on to upset the Longhorns 20–0. Later the same season, Vanderbilt faced Georgia in a contest for the Southern crown, tying the game late on an onside-kick-from-scrimmage 7–7.

Vanderbilt athletics historian Bill Traughber describes McGugin's speech before the 1922 game against the Michigan Wolverines at the dedication of Dudley Field:

In the locker room prior to the kickoff, McGugin gave his hopeful pregame inspirational talk. Referring to the Michigan players, McGugin said, "You are going against Yankees, some of whose grandfathers killed your grandfathers in the Civil War." Unknown to the Commodore players was the fact that McGugin's father had been an officer in the Union army.

The quote is also reported, probably more accurately, as "Out there lie the bones of your grandfathers;" referring to the nearby military cemetery, "And down on that field are the grandsons of the Yankee soldiers who put them there."

Next season Wade left to coach Alabama and was replaced by former tackle Josh Cody. (Note: Wade won Alabama's first national titles.) The 1923 Commodores won Vanderbilt's last conference title in football to-date. Lynn Bomar was consensus All-American.

=== 1924–1934 ===
Sportswriter Fred Russell dubbed the 1924 season "the most eventful in the history of Vanderbilt football", featuring wins over Georgia Tech and Minnesota, as well as losses such as to Sewanee. End Hek Wakefield was consensus All-American, and beat Georgia Tech 3–0 with a 37-yard drop-kick field goal. He was considered the greatest drop kicker in school history.

The 1925 Commodores saw the first year of running back Bill Spears. The 1926 team suffered its only loss to Wade's national champion Alabama team. In 1927, Spears posted multiple passing records and halfback Jimmy Armistead led the nation in scoring. After the 32–0 defeat of Bernie Bierman's Tulane Green Wave that year, Bierman thought of ditching his single-wingback formation. McGugin convinced him to keep it. Along with Spears and Armistead, end Larry Creson was All-Southern.

Armistead took Spears' spot at quarterback in 1928 and was second-team All-Southern. Vanderbilt suffered only two losses – both to undefeated teams: Georgia Tech and Tennessee. Guard Bull Brown was All-American in 1929. The 1930 team beat Minnesota. Center Pete Gracey told this story about McGugin in 1930: "In my first varsity year, the night before we played Georgia Tech, Coach McGugin casually walked up to me in the lobby of our hotel, put his arm around my shoulder and sorta whispered, "I was with some Atlanta newspapermen this afternoon and I told them you were the finest sophomore center I had ever coached. I hope that I haven't made it embarrassing for you" We beat Tech, 49 to 7. Afterward I talked to seven other players and you know, Coach McGugin told them all the same thing he told me."

The 1931 team beat Ohio State, but lost four other games. Pete Gracey was a consensus All-American in 1932. The Commodores and rival Volunteers fought to a scoreless tie. "Considering that we lost such a valuable player as Pete Gracey so early in the game, I thought that Vanderbilt was very fortunate in getting out with a tie" said McGugin.

Following the 1932 season, Vanderbilt joined the other SoCon schools south and west of the Appalachians in founding the Southeastern Conference. The 1933 team lost three and tied three, the worst season for McGugin since 1914.

McGugin retired after the 1934 season. He remains the most successful Vanderbilt head football coach in the history of the program. He selected: Bull Brown, Josh Cody, Lew Hardage, Ray Morrison, Bill Spears, and Hek Wakefield as the six best players he ever coached.

== Lawyer ==
McGugin was a corporate lawyer in the offseason, and maintained an active office in Nashville. He worked in the First National Bank Building, and his law partner was John R. Austin. He was also a professor of law at Vanderbilt.

== Legacy ==
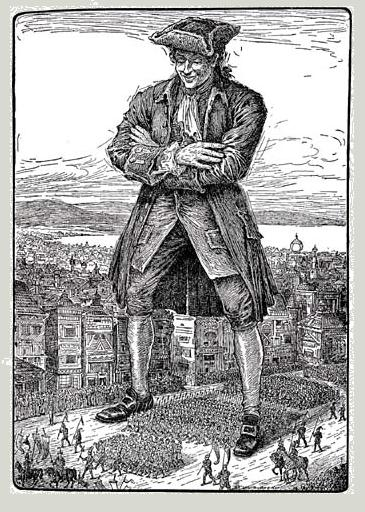
"McGugin stood out in the South like Gulliver among the native sons of Lilliput" said sportswriter Fuzzy Woodruff.

McGugin died of heart failure in 1936, just two years after quitting the coaching profession and taking on the position of athletic director. At the time of his retirement, he had served longer at one institution than any other coach in America. He was inducted into the College Football Hall of Fame as part of its inaugural 1951 class. He was inducted into the Tennessee Sports Hall of Fame in 1966. He was inducted into the Iowa Sports Hall of Fame.

Sportswriter Fuzzy Woodruff wrote:

The plain facts of the business are that McGugin stood out in the South like Gulliver among the native sons of Lilliput... There was no foeman worthy of the McGugin steel.

Sportswriter Zipp Newman wrote:

I believe Dan McGugin would have gone down in history as the greatest of all coaches had he given all of his time to coaching. He was a great play-maker, but football was a sport for the beloved McGugin and law was his profession."

Fred Russell wrote of McGugin:

For years he ruled supreme in Dixie, and his teams won many glorious intersectional victories. More than any one man, he was responsible for the progress of southern football.... He was the first coach to successfully work the onside kick. He was among the first to bring out guards in the interference.... His name will never die.

=== Coaching tree ===
McGugin served under one head coach:

- Fielding Yost, Michigan (1903)

23 of McGugin's former players at Vanderbilt later became head coaches:

- Frank Kyle, Ole Miss (1908)
- Stein Stone, Clemson (1908)
- Honus Craig, Texas Wesleyan (1909)
- Joe Pritchard, LSU (1909)
- Sam Costen, The Citadel (1909–1910)
- Alex Cunningham, Georgia (1910–1919)
- Lewie Hardage, Mercer (1913), Oklahoma (1932–1934)
- Fred A. Robins, Mercer (1914), Ole Miss (1915–1916)
- Ewing Y. Freeland, TCU (1915), Austin (1919–1920; 1936–1938), Millsaps (1921), SMU (1922–1923), Texas Tech (1925–1928)
- Ray Morrison, SMU (1915–1916; 1922–1934), Vanderbilt (1918; 1935–1939), Temple (1940–1948), Austin (1949–1952)
- Charles H. Brown, Birmingham–Southern (1916; 1919–1923)
- Johnny Floyd, Middle Tennessee State (1917; 1935–1938), Auburn (1929), The Citadel (1930–1931)
- Josh Cody, Mercer (1920–1922), Clemson (1927–1930), Florida (1936–1939), Temple (1955)
- Hershel B. Northcutt, Hendrix College (1922–1923)
- Hubert Wiggs, Louisville Brecks (1922)
- Preston Vaughn Overall, Tennessee Tech (1923–1946; 1952–1953)
- Zach Curlin, Memphis (1924–1936)
- Jess Neely, Southwestern (TN) (1924–1927), Clemson (1931–1939), Rice (1940–1966)
- Bo Rowland, Henderson-Brown (1925–1930), Ouachita Baptist (1931), The Citadel (1940–1942), Oklahoma City (1946–1947), George Washington (1948–1951)
- Russ Cohen, LSU (1928–1931), Cincinnati (1935–1937)
- Garland Morrow, Cumberland (1932–1935)
- E. M. Waller, Middle Tennessee State (1933–1934)
- Henry Russell Sanders, Vanderbilt (1940–1942; 1946–1948) and UCLA (1949–1957)

One of McGugin's former assistants at Vanderbilt later became a head coach:

- Wallace Wade, Alabama (1923–1930), Duke (1931–1941; 1946–1950)

== Head coaching record ==
Year	Team	Overall	Conference	Standing	Bowl/playoffs
Vanderbilt Commodores (Southern Intercollegiate Athletic Association) (1904–1917)
1904	Vanderbilt	9–0	4–0	T–1st	
1905	Vanderbilt	7–1	6–0	1st	
1906	Vanderbilt	8–1	6–0	1st	
1907	Vanderbilt	5–1–1	4–0	1st	
1908	Vanderbilt	7–2–1	3–0–1	3rd	
1909	Vanderbilt	7–3	3–1	T–2nd	
1910	Vanderbilt	8–0–1	5–0	T–1st	
1911	Vanderbilt	8–1	4–0	1st	
1912	Vanderbilt	8–1–1	4–0–1	1st	
1913	Vanderbilt	5–3	2–1	5th	
1914	Vanderbilt	2–6	1–3	13th	
1915	Vanderbilt	9–1	4–0	1st	
1916	Vanderbilt	7–1–1	4–1–1	4th	
1917	Vanderbilt	5–3	5–2	8th	
Vanderbilt Commodores (Southern Intercollegiate Athletic Association) (1919–1921)
1919	Vanderbilt	5–1–2	4–1–2	4th	
1920	Vanderbilt	5–3–1	3–3	11th	
1921	Vanderbilt	7–0–1	4–0–1	T–1st	
Vanderbilt Commodores (Southern Conference) (1922–1932)
1922	Vanderbilt	8–0–1	4–0	T–1st	
1923	Vanderbilt	5–2–1	3–0–1	T–1st	
1924	Vanderbilt	6–3–1	3–3	T–11th	
1925	Vanderbilt	6–3	3–3	T–10th	
1926	Vanderbilt	8–1	4–1	3rd	
1927	Vanderbilt	8–1–2	5–0–2	3rd	
1928	Vanderbilt	8–2	4–2	T–7th	
1929	Vanderbilt	7–2	5–1	5th	
1930	Vanderbilt	8–2	5–2	5th	
1931	Vanderbilt	5–4	3–4	12th	
1932	Vanderbilt	6–1–2	4–1–2	5th	
Vanderbilt Commodores (Southeastern Conference) (1933–1934)
1933	Vanderbilt	4–3–3	2–2–2	T–6th	
1934	Vanderbilt	6–3	4–3	6th	
Vanderbilt:		197–55–19	115–34–13		
Total:		197–55–19			
National championship Conference title Conference division title or championship game berth

== See also ==
- List of college football head coaches with non-consecutive tenure

== Books ==
- Pope, Edwin (1955). Football's Greatest Coaches – via archive.org.
- Russell, Fred (1938). Fifty Years of Vanderbilt Football. Nashville, Tennessee.
- Scott, Richard (2008). SEC Football: 75 Years of Pride and Passion. Minneapolis: Voyageur.
- Traughber, Bill (2011). Vanderbilt Football:Tales of Commodore Gridiron History.
- Walsh, Christopher J. (2006). Where Football Is King: A History of the SEC. Taylor Trade Publishing. ISBN 9781461734772.
- Weatherby, Charles (2014). "Wilson Collins". The Miracle Braves of 1914: Boston's Original Worst-to-First World Series. ISBN 9781933599700.
- Woodruff, Fuzzy (1928). A History of Southern Football 1890–1928. Vol. 1.
- Woodruff, Fuzzy (1928). A History of Southern Football 1890–1928. Vol. 2.
