= Ralph Tidrick =

American football player and missionary

- Born: April 13, 1875; Bedford, Iowa, U.S.
- Died: April 21, 1914 (aged 39); Khartoum, Sudan

Ralph Wishart Tidrick (April 13, 1875 – April 21, 1914) was a missionary from Iowa. He attended Tingley High School with Vanderbilt football coach Dan McGugin and the parents of painter Jackson Pollock. Tidrick was killed by a lion in Sudan. He was a tackle on the 1904 Ames football team.
