= History of Michigan Wolverines football in the Yost era =

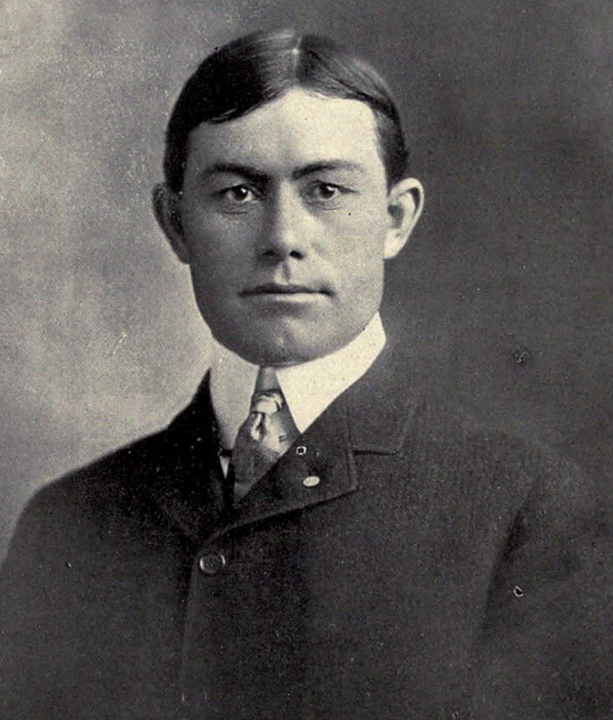
Fielding H. Yost in 1902 at the start of the Yost era

The History of Michigan Wolverines football in the Yost era covers the period from the hiring of Fielding H. Yost as head coach in 1901 through Yost's firing of Tad Wieman as head coach after the 1928 season. The era includes the brief head coaching tenures of George Little (head coach in 1924 during Yost's first retirement) and Tad Wieman (head coach after Yost's second retirement). Wieman was head coach during the 1927 and 1928 seasons but contended that he had never truly been allowed to take control of the team with Yost remaining as an assistant coach and athletic director.

During the 28 years of the Yost era, Michigan claims six national championship (1901, 1902, 1903, 1904, 1918, and 1923), had two additional undefeated seasons (1910 and 1922), and compiled an overall record of 180–37–11 (.814). In Yost's first five years as Michigan's head coach, the team compiled a record of 55–1–1 and outscored its opponents by a margin of 2,821 to 42. The teams from these years became known as Yost's "Point-a-Minute" teams, because their offensive production resulted in an average of at least one point being scored for every minute of play.

Five of Michigan's coaches and nine of its players from the Yost era have been inducted into the College Football Hall of Fame. The five coaches are Yost, Little, Wieman, Bennie Owen (assistant coach in 1901 who later won acclaim at Oklahoma), and Dan McGugin (assistant coach in 1903 who later won acclaim at Vanderbilt). The players are Neil Snow (end, 1898–1901), Willie Heston (halfback, 1901–1904), Germany Schulz (center, 1904–1905, 1907–1908), Albert Benbrook (guard, 1908–1910), John Maulbetsch (halfback, 1914–1916), Harry Kipke (halfback, 1920–1923), Ernie Vick (center, 1918–1921), Benny Friedman (quarterback, 1924–1926), and Bennie Oosterbaan (end, 1925–1927).

== Overview of the Yost era ==
=== Hiring of Yost ===
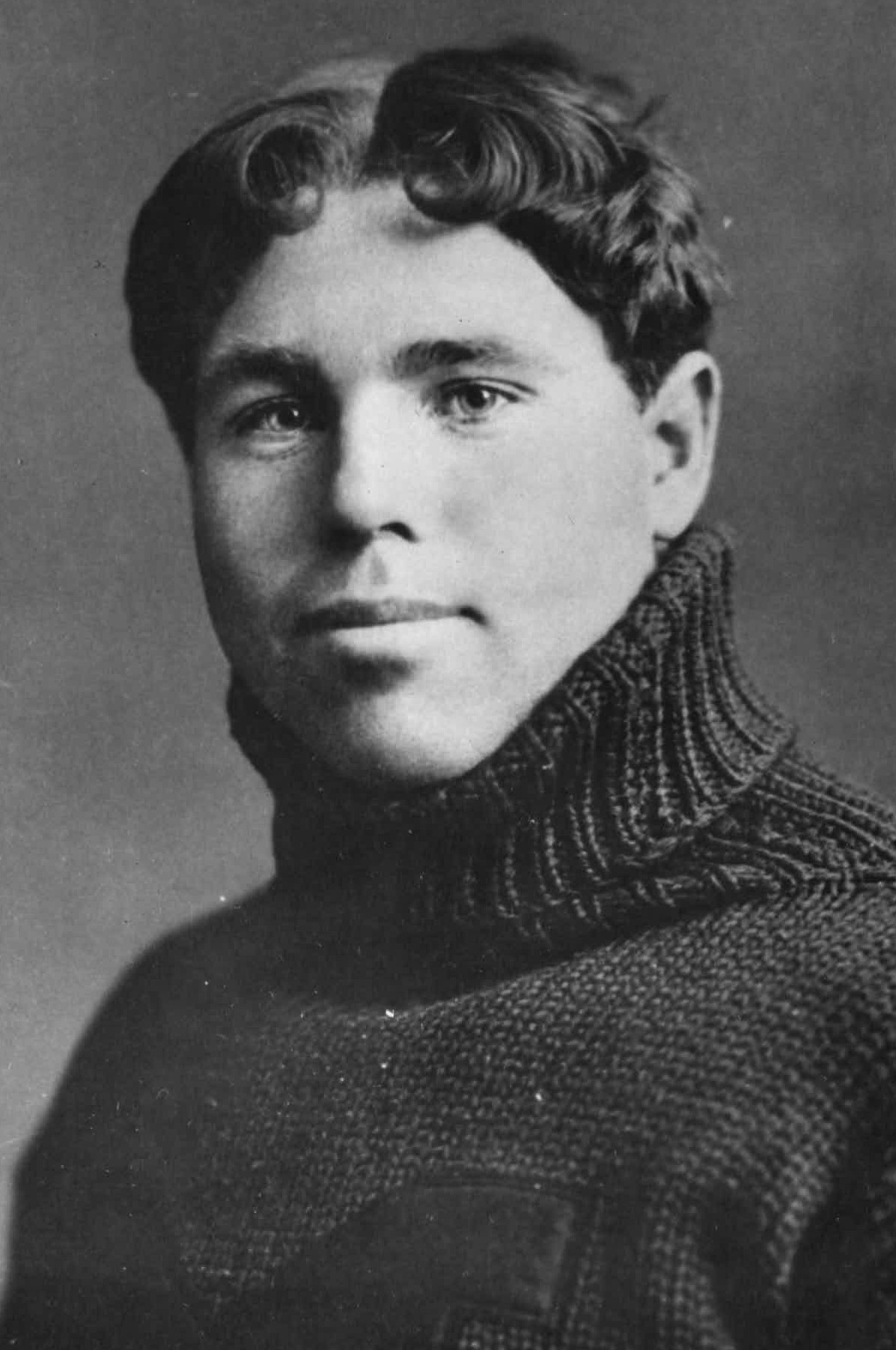
Willie Heston in 1902

In January 1901, Langdon Lea resigned after one year as Michigan's head football coach. At the end of the 1900 football season, Stanford University passed a rule requiring all coaches to be alumni. The decision left Stanford's football coach, Fielding H. Yost, who was not an alumnus, without a job. Yost wrote to the University of Illinois in December 1900 seeking a job. Illinois did not have an opening, but the school's athletic director passed along Yost's letter to Michigan athletic director Charles A. Baird. Baird invited Yost to Ann Arbor to interview for the job, and Yost sent a box of clippings to Baird reporting on his accomplishments and championships as a coach at Ohio Wesleyan (1897), Nebraska (1898), Kansas (1899), Stanford (1900), and San Jose State Normal School (1900). When Yost arrived in Ann Arbor, Baird met him at the train station and hired him on the spot after a brief exchange.

Yost's first recruit after agreeing to coach the Wolverines was Willie Heston. Heston had played for San Jose State Normal School from 1898 to 1900, and Yost coached him briefly in 1900. In the summer of 1901, Yost wrote to Heston inviting Heston to continue his education at Michigan. Heston initially declined, but subsequently agreed and joined Yost at Michigan in late summer. Heston enrolled in the law school in the fall of 1901 and became a key player on the "Point-a-Minute" teams. At five feet eight inches and 185 pounds, Heston was described as being "compact and muscularly built." He was known for his quick starting ability. Archie Hahn, the 1904 Olympic gold medalist in the 100-meter run, was a classmate of Heston at Michigan. Although Heston could not outrun Hahn at the 100-yard distance, he was regularly able to beat Hahn in impromptu 40-yard races.

=== "Point-a-Minute" teams ===
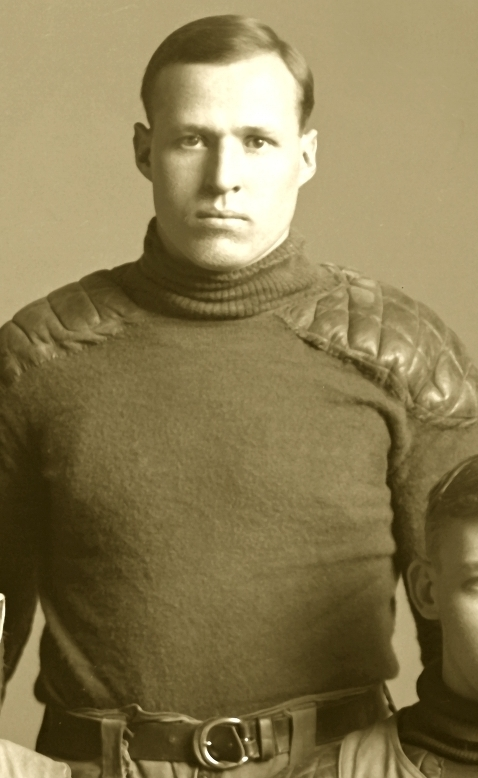
Joe Curtis scored 49 points in a single game in 1904.

In Yost's first five years as Michigan's head coach, the team compiled a record of 55–1–1 and outscored its opponents by a margin of 2,821 to 42. The teams from these years became known as Yost's "Point-a-Minute" teams, as their offensive production resulted in an average of at least one point being scored for every minute of play.

In 1901, Michigan compiled an 11–0 record while outscoring its opponents 550 to 0. The 1901 team scored the highest number of points ever scored in a single season by a recognized team. The team became known for the speed of play, running 219 plays in a single game. The fast pace earned the coach the nickname "Hurry Up" Yost. Michigan defeated the University of Buffalo by a score of 128–0 -- a victory so dominant that Buffalo quit 15 minutes before the game should have ended.

At the end of the 1901 season, Michigan traveled to Pasadena, California, to play against Stanford (the team that had fired Yost one year earlier) in the 1902 Rose Bowl. The game was the first post-season bowl game in college football history. Neil Snow scored five touchdowns, and with Michigan ahead 49-0 and eight minutes remaining, Stanford captain Ralph Fisher asked that the game be stopped, and Michigan agreed.

The 1902 team compiled the school's second consecutive undefeated season and national championship and outscored opponents 644 to 12. The margins of victory run up by the 1902 team included scores of 119–0 against Michigan Agricultural (now known as Michigan State), 107–0 against Iowa, and 86–0 against Ohio State. Michigan's undefeated streak continued through the 1903 and 1904 seasons (with one tie against Minnesota in 1903). The 1904 team ran up the biggest winning margin in school history with a 130–0 victory over West Virginia. Left tackle Joe Curtis scored 49 points against West Virginia on six touchdowns (then valued at five points) and 19 extra points.

The 1905 Michigan team won its first 12 games by a combined score of 495 to 0, continuing its high-scoring tradition. However, in the final game of the season, the Wolverines lost by a score of 2–0 against Amos Alonzo Stagg's Chicago Maroons. The loss to Chicago broke Michigan's 56-game unbeaten streak and marked the end of the "Point-a-Minute" years. The game was lost in the final ten minutes of play when Denny Clark was tackled for a safety as he attempted to return a punt from behind the goal line. Newspapers described Clark's play as "the wretched blunder" and a "lapse of brain work." Clark transferred to M.I.T. the following year and was haunted by the play for the rest of his life. In 1932, he shot himself, leaving a suicide note that reportedly expressed hope that his "final play" would atone for his error at Marshall Field in 1905.

=== Withdrawal from the Conference ===
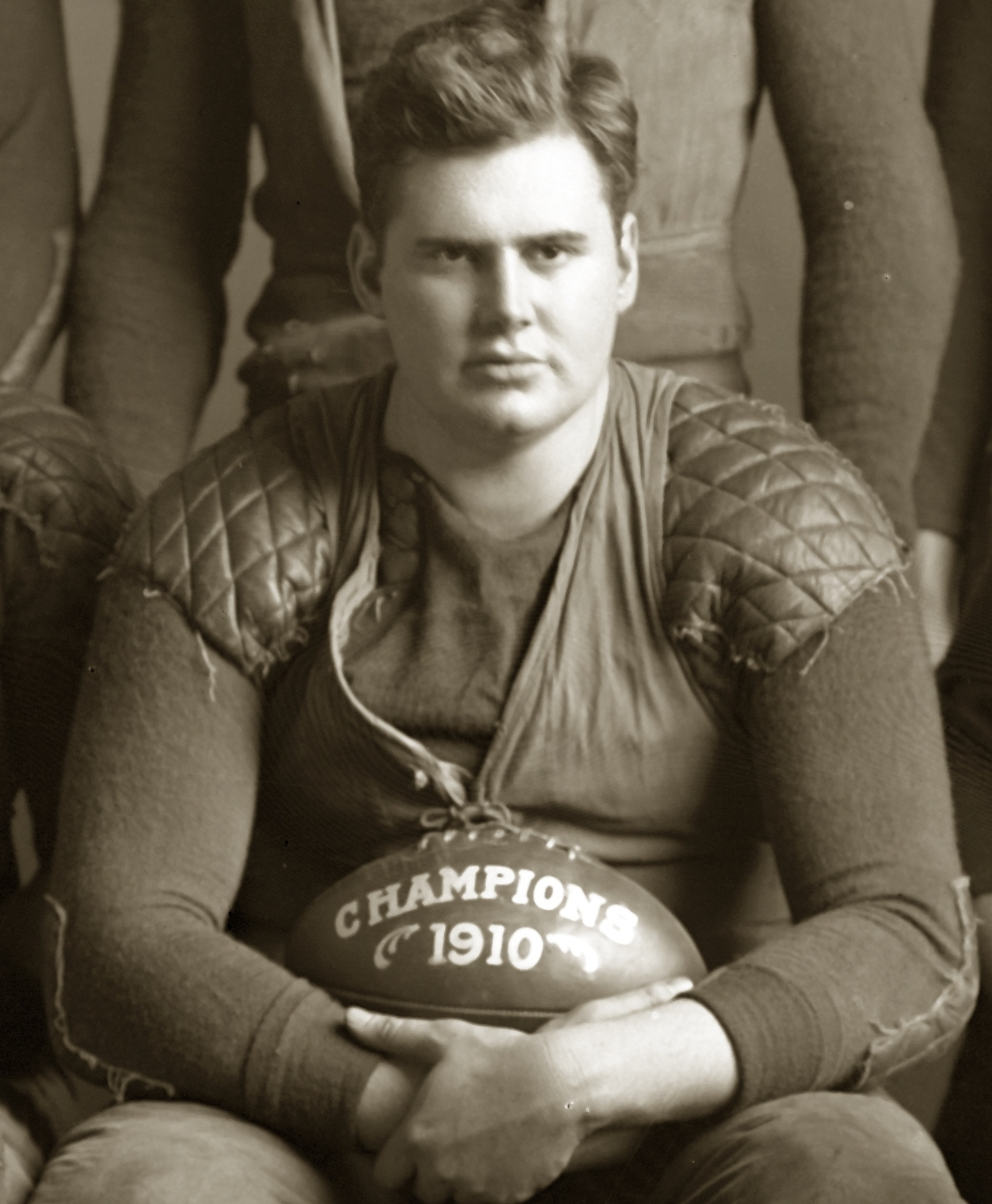
Albert Benbrook in 1910.

The Michigan football program became mired in scandal in late 1905 and 1906. In November 1905, Stanford president David Starr Jordan wrote a feature article in Collier's magazine making allegations of "professionalism" at Michigan. Jordan accused Yost of traveling across the country "soliciting expert players" who were not true student athletes. Michigan athletic director Baird called Jordan's allegations "the merest bosh" and denied any inducements or special favors for athletes.

Lingering concerns about professionalism and the integrity of amateur athletics led Michigan's president, James Burrill Angell, to call for a conference of Western Conference faculty in January 1906. The gatherings, which became known as the Angell Conferences, condemned the "money end" of football and resolved that university faculty should have charge of gate receipts. The group voted in March 1906 to prohibit summer training, to eliminate professional coaches and the "training table", and to limit the admission price to college athletic events to a maximum of fifty cents.

The reforms also limited member schools to five football games per year. Accordingly, and despite playing 13 regular season games in 1905, Michigan was permitted to play only five games in 1906. Michigan finished 4–1 in 1906, losing the final game of the season to Penn. The Penn game was played in Philadelphia before 26,000 spectators — setting a new record for the highest attendance at a Michigan football game.

A further reform measure that went into effect in 1907 was a provision limiting players' eligibility to three years. The rule was applied retroactively so that many players, including Michigan's captain Germany Schulz, would be ineligible to play as seniors even though they had played as freshman when such play was within the rules. In April 1907, the Western Conference schools voted to oust Michigan from the league if they didn't follow the new rules implemented in 1905.Michigan announced that it would not comply with the new restrictions, and all athletic competition between Michigan and other Western Conference schools was severed.

During the winter and spring of 1908, the controversy over withdrawal from the Western Conference continued. In April 1908, the school's Board in Control of College Athletics voted in favor of withdrawal. Michigan ceased being a member of the conference for the next nine years.

=== The independent years ===
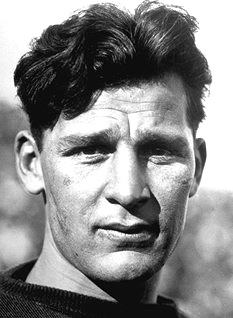
Michigan's "Featherweight Fullback" John Maulbetsch

Michigan played as an independent from 1907 to 1917. The independent years were not as kind to Yost as his years in the Western Conference. Michigan began the 1907 season with five victories, outscoring opponents 107 to 0, but lost to Penn by a 6–0 score in the final game of the season. In 1908, Michigan lost the final two games of the season to Penn and Syracuse. In 1909, Michigan suffered its first loss to Notre Dame. In 1910, Michigan was led by All-Americans Albert Benbrook and Stanfield Wells and played its only undefeated season of the independent years, compiling a 3–0–3 record.

The 1913 team, led by consensus All-American Jimmy Craig, compiled a record of 6–1, outscored opponents 175 to 21, and shut out four opponents while giving up an average of only three points per game. During its decade-long absence from the Western Conference, Michigan played inter-sectional rivalry games against Penn (12 games in 12 years from 1906 to 1917), Syracuse (10 games from 1908 to 1918), Cornell (7 games from 1911 to 1917), and Vanderbilt (7 games from 1905 to 1914). In the final month of the 1913 season, Michigan defeated its four inter-sectional rivals by a combined score of 106 to 9.

=== Return to the Conference ===
In June 1917, the Western Conference faculty representatives voted unanimously to invite Michigan to resume athletic relations with the conference. Michigan rejoined the conference (which became known as the Big Ten) that fall. As the 1917 schedule had already been established, Michigan played only one conference game in 1917.

=== World War I and the 1918 season ===
By 1918, the United States was embroiled in World War I. Many University of Michigan students, including athletes, were serving in the military. Team captain Tad Wieman did not play during the 1918 season as he had enlisted in the Aviation Corps. Halfback Eddie Usher was also taken into active military service after the first game of the season.

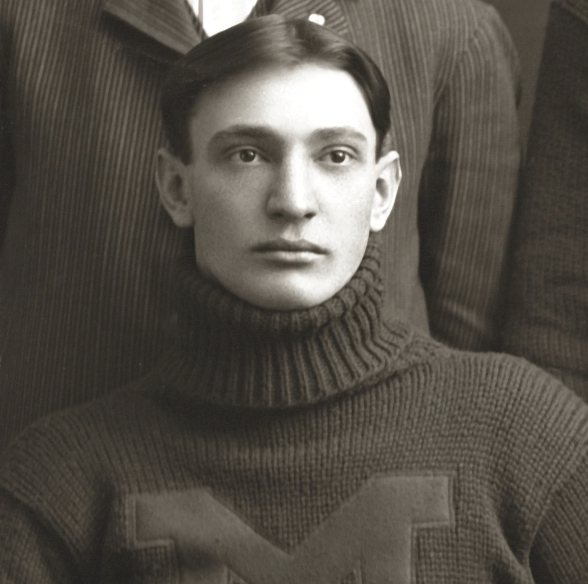
Curtis Redden's letter from the front was published before the start of the 1918 season.

Three former Michigan football players were killed in the war. One of the casualties was Curtis Redden, star end of Fielding Yost's "Point-a-Minute" teams. In April 1918, newspapers published a letter from Redden to a friend back home describing his unit's "baptism of fire":

"And so it went from day to day, but oftimes the nights were very bad. At night, when the infantry launched its raids, or the enemy his, or the infantry became nervous and called for help, the guns stamped like stallions and snorted their breaths of fire. The blackness of the night became a series of dots and dashes, until the world resembled a vast radio station, spelling hell, hell, and hell again. To this must be added the shriek of shells, the whistle of fragments, the automatic hammer effect of the machine gun, the rattle of the rifle fire, the rockets and star shells out over No Man's land—all combined to make the night weird, hideous, fascinating, sublime."

Before the football season began, a rumor spread that football would be abandoned for 1918. Ultimately, the season proceeded but was shortened by World War I travel restrictions and the 1918 flu pandemic. The 1918 Wolverines shared the Big Ten Conference championship with Illinois and finished with a perfect record of 5–0, outscoring opponents 96 to 6. Although no formal mechanism existed in 1918 to select a national champion, the 1918 Michigan team has been deemed a national championship team by the Billingsley Report and the National Championship Foundation.

=== Post-war years ===
In 1919, the Wolverines suffered their only losing season under Yost, compiling a record of 3–4 (1–4 Big Ten). After the disappointing 1919 season, Yost began to rebuild, losing two games in 1920 and one game in 1921.

The 1922 team compiled a 6–0–1 record and tied with Iowa for the Big Ten championship. Highlights of the 1922 season included participation in dedication games for Vanderbilt University's Dudley Field, the first large athletic stadium in the South, and Ohio State University's Ohio Stadium. In the latter, the Wolverines shut out the Buckeyes, 19–0. Halfback Harry Kipke led the 1922 team in scoring, handled punting responsibilities, and was selected as a consensus All-American. Left end Bernard Kirk died of meningitis in December 1922 after sustaining a brain injury in an automobile crash. Kirk's funeral was attended by the governor, the university president, and U.S. Congressmen. As eight Michigan teammates lowered his casket, the "husky athletes who battled with him on the football fields for the glory and honor of Michigan sobbed unashamed."

In 1923, Michigan compiled an undefeated record for the second consecutive year and again tied for the Big Ten championship. The team, again led by Kipke, won all eight of its games by a combined score of 150–12 and has been recognized as a national championship team by the Billingsley Report and the National Championship Foundation. On defense, the 1923 team gave up an average of 1.6 points per game, held its first four opponents scoreless, and gave up only one touchdown during the entire season.

=== 1924 season under George Little ===
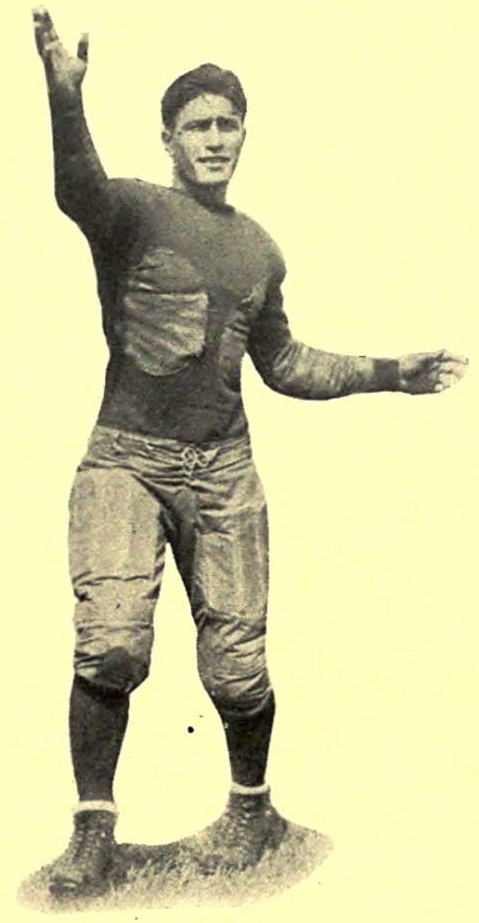
Benny Friedman

Yost retired as Michigan's head football coach before the start of the 1924 season in order to focus on his duties as the school's athletic director, a post he had held since 1921. He was replaced as head coach by one of his assistants, George Little but stayed on as an "advisory coach." The Wolverines were in the midst of a 20-game unbeaten streak when they played Illinois in the third game of the season. Red Grange vaulted to national prominence as a result of his performance in the game, returning the opening kickoff for a 95-yard touchdown and scoring five touchdowns in all, including touchdown runs of 67, 56 and 44 yards. The Illini beat Michigan, 39–14, Michigan's first loss since October 1921. The Wolverines lost again to Iowa and finished the 1924 season with a record of 6–2 (4–2 Big Ten). After the 1924 season, Little left Michigan to accept the head coach and athletic director positions at Wisconsin.

=== Yost's return ===
In 1925, Yost returned as Michigan's head football coach. His 1925 team compiled a record of 7–1 and outscored opponents by a combined total of 227 to 3. The 1925 team won the Big Ten Conference championship and was ranked second in country in the Dickinson System rankings. The only points allowed by the 1925 team were in a 3 to 2 loss to Northwestern, a game played in a heavy rainstorm on a field covered in mud five or six inches deep in some places. Michigan shut out seven of its eight opponents and allowed only four first downs in the last three games of the season. At the end of the season, Yost called the 1925 Michigan team "the greatest football team I ever coached" and "the greatest football team I ever saw in action."

Yost's 1926 team compiled a 7–1 record (5–0 Big Ten) and tied with Northwestern for the Big Ten championship. During the 1925 and 1926 seasons, quarterback Benny Friedman and left end Bennie Oosterbaan, sometimes referred to as "The Benny-to-Bennie Show", became known as one of the greatest passing combinations in college football history. Both Friedman and Oosterbaan were later inducted into the College Football Hall of Fame. Oosterbaan became a three-time All-American and was selected for the All-Time All-American team in 1951, while Friedman would go on to have a Hall of Fame NFL career.

=== Wieman years ===
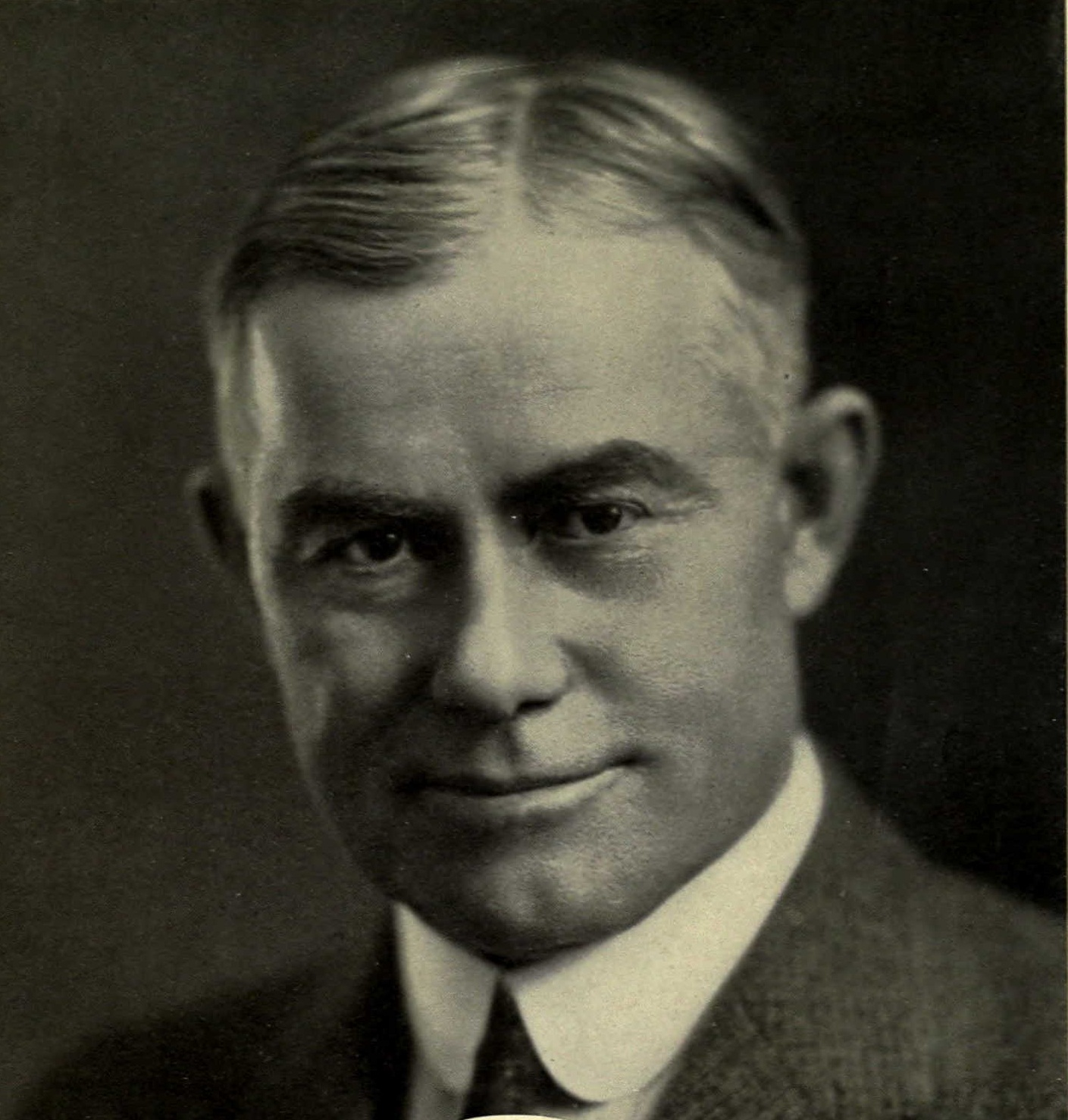
Yost in 1928 at the end of the Yost era

At the end of the 1926 season, Yost retired as head football coach for a second time, and Tad Wieman was appointed as the new head coach. Yost remained as the athletic director and assistant football coach and proved reluctant to cede control of the football team to Wieman. Before the 1928 season began, Yost announced that he would return to his head coaching responsibilities. Yost then announced the night before the season opener that Wieman was once again the head football coach. In October 1928, newspapers reported there had been a break between Yost and Wieman. Wieman reportedly contended that he had never truly been allowed to take control of the team and felt that he was being used as a scapegoat for the team's poor showing. In May 1929, Yost announced that Wieman was no longer a member of the coaching staff. Wieman was replaced as head football coach by Harry Kipke who led Michigan to national championships in 1932 and 1933. Wieman went on to a long and successful career as a football coach at Princeton and an athletic director at Maine and Denver.

== Rivalries ==
=== Little Brown Jug ===
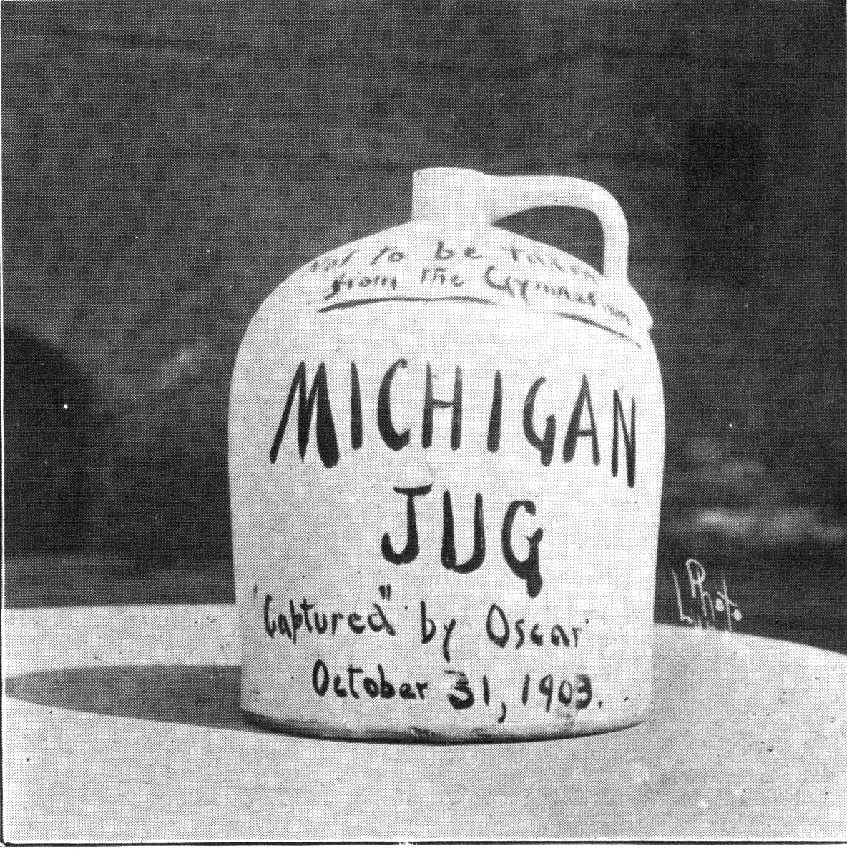
Photograph of the "Michigan Jug" (which was neither little nor brown) from the 1909 Michiganensian

The Little Brown Jug rivalry between Michigan and Minnesota developed into one of the sport's top rivalries during the Yost era. The tradition of the Little Brown Jug began when Minnesota played Yost's 1903 "Point-a-Minute" team to a 6–6 tie—breaking Michigan's 28-game winning streak. According to the lore of the Little Brown Jug, Yost was concerned that Gopher fans might contaminate his water supply and sent the team's student manager to purchase a jug from a store in Minneapolis. When the game ended, pandemonium broke out as Minnesota fans stormed the field, and Michigan left the jug behind.

The next day, custodian Oscar Munson brought the jug to L. J. Cooke, head of the Minnesota athletics department, and reportedly declared in a thick Scandinavian accent: "Yost left his yug." Some accounts say that Munson purposely stole the jug in the chaos that ended the game, although most believe it was accidentally left behind. Michigan's student manager, writing in 1956, stated that the jug had served its purpose, so he intentionally left it sitting on the field. Cooke and Munson proceeded to paint the jug and commemorated the day by writing "Michigan Jug – Captured by Oscar, October 31, 1903" on the side of the jug.

When the two schools met in football again in 1909, Cooke proposed playing for the jug. Yost agreed, and the jug became the traveling trophy it is today. Michigan reclaimed the jug in 1909 and defeated Minnesota again in 1910. The teams did not play between 1910 and 1919 due to a Western Conference rule prohibiting member schools from playing Michigan. After Michigan rejoined conference, the teams played in 1919, with Minnesota winning the game and the right to bring the jug back to Minnesota. Michigan then won eight consecutive games against Minnesota from 1920 to 1926 by a combined score of 142 to 13. During the 28 years of the Yost era, Michigan compiled an 11-2-1 record against Minnesota.

=== Michigan State ===
The Michigan – Michigan State football rivalry also developed during the Yost era. Prior to 1901, the teams had played only once, in 1898. Michigan's 1902 "Point-a-Minute" team defeated Michigan Agricultural College (as Michigan State was then known) by a score of 119–0, the highest margin of victory in any game between the two programs. The teams did not play again until 1907, and from that point forward, the schools began a tradition of playing each other on a more-or-less annual basis.

In 1908, the Aggies played the Wolverines to a scoreless tie at East Lansing's College Field. As Michigan had won the three prior meetings by a combined score of 204 to 0, the Aggies' fans "went wild with delight" when the game ended.

Michigan won the next three games from 1910 to 1912, but the Aggies surprised the Wolverines in 1913 with their first victory in the series. Michigan's 1913 team was considered one of Yost's best, outscoring all opponents but Michigan Agricultural by a combined score of 168 to 9. The Aggies were led by fullback "Carp" Julian, who scored touchdowns in the first and third quarters, as the Aggies defeated the Wolverines, 12–7, at Ferry Field. The Michigan Alumnus made note of the Aggies' potential as an athletic threat: "This victory with the football tie in 1908, and the Farmers' clean sweep in baseball in 1912, point to the fact that M.A.C. will bear watching by Michigan." In the celebration following the game, the Detroit Free Press reported that two Aggies fans were arrested and jailed for "throwing bottles about the streets" in the early hours of Sunday morning.

The Aggies won again in 1915, but Michigan then won 14 consecutive games from 1916 to 1929. During the entire span of the Yost era, Michigan compiled a 19-2-1 record against Michigan State.

=== Notre Dame ===
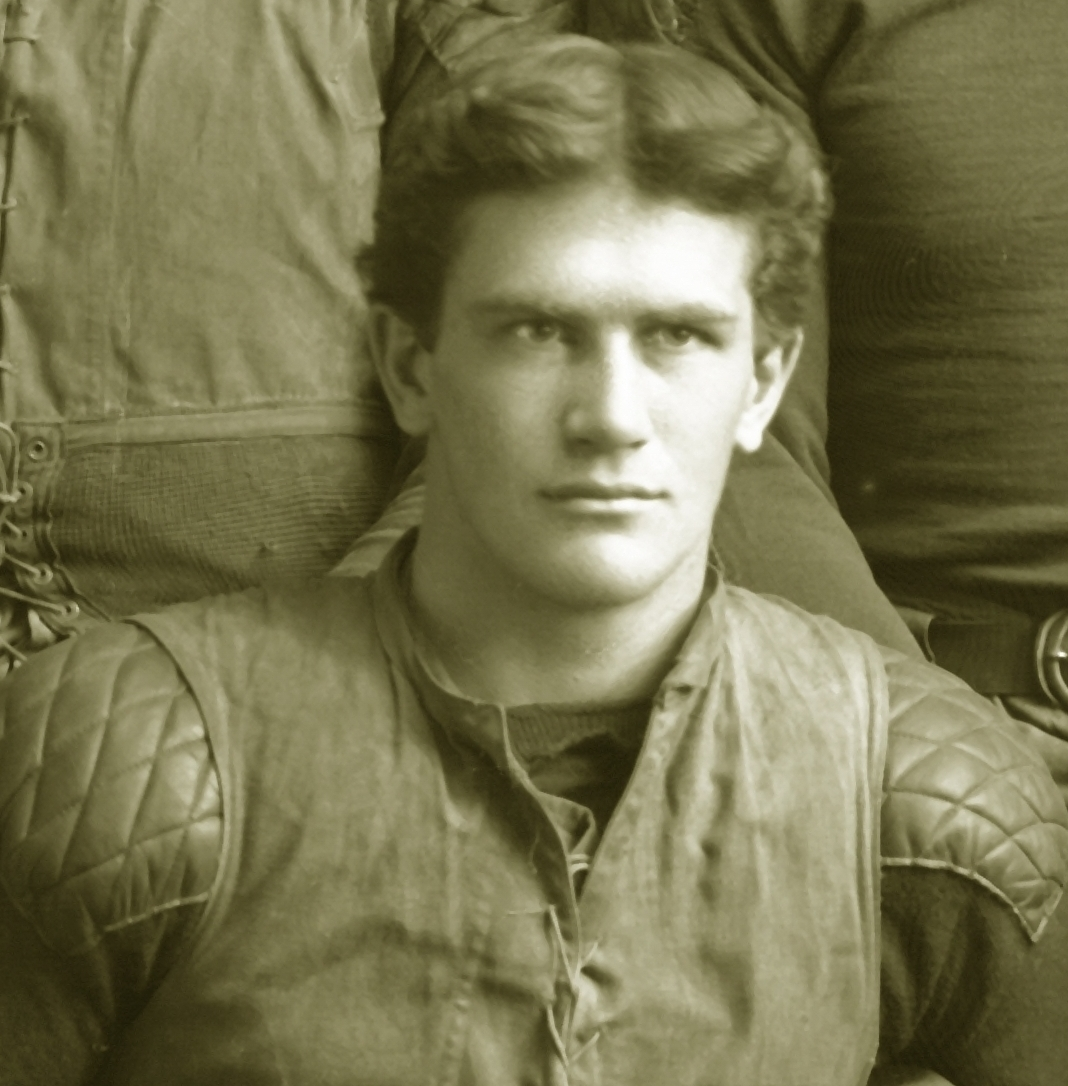
Frank Longman's "'Fighting Irishmen' wrecked the Yost machine" in 1909.

The Michigan–Notre Dame football rivalry also took on new significance, although the programs met only three times during the Yost era. Michigan won the games played in 1902 (23-21) and 1908 (12-0). In 1909, Notre Dame won for the first time in the series history. Coached by Frank Longman, who had played for Yost at Michigan, Notre Dame defeated Michigan by a score of 11 to 3. The 1909 game gave birth to the "Fighting Irish" nickname. E. A. Batchelor, a sportswriter for the Detroit Free Press, submitted a report on the game with the headline: "'Shorty' Longman's Fighting Irishmen Humble the Wolverines to Tune of 11 to 3." Batchelor opened his report as follows:

"Eleven Fighting Irishmen wrecked the Yost machine this afternoon. These sons of Erin, individually and collectively representing the University of Notre Dame, not only beat the Michigan team, but dashed some of Michigan's greatest hopes and shattered Michigan's fairest dreams."

Notre Dame football historian, John Kryk, later wrote: "With that flowery lead, E.A. Batchelor of the Detroit Free Press popularized a moniker Notre Dame teams would later come to embrace – and aptly summed up the greatest athletic achievement to that point in Notre Dame history." Kryk noted that, according to Notre Dame folklore, Batchelor had overheard a Notre Dame player trying to motivate his teammates at halftime by pleading, "What's the matter with you guys? You're all Irish and you're not fighting worth a lick."

Michigan was scheduled to play Notre Dame again on November 5, 1910. Michigan protested Notre Dame's use of two players (Philbrook and Dimmick) who had reportedly played more than four years of college football. After Notre Dame refused to bench the players, Michigan's Board of Control of Athletics canceled the game. The New York Times reported: "It is understood here that this ends all athletic relations between Michigan and Notre Dame." The two teams did not play again for more than 30 years, the longest break in the history of the storied rivalry.

=== Ohio State ===
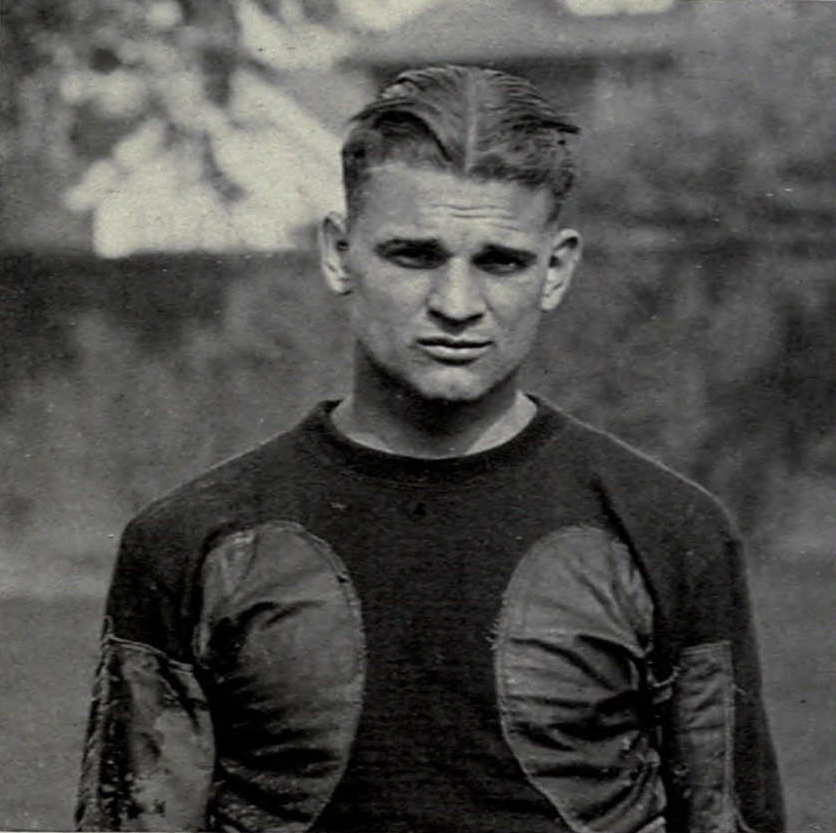
Harry Kipke in 1922

While the Michigan–Ohio State football rivalry later became regarded as one of the great rivalries in any sport, the rivalry was not competitive for most of the Yost era. During the "Point-a-Minute" years, Michigan won all five games by a combined score of 214 to 6, including an 86–0 score in 1902—the most lopsided game in the history of the series. In late 1912, Ohio State agreed to join the Western Conference starting in 1913. As a result, Ohio State was barred by a Conference rule from playing Michigan, and the two teams did not play from 1913 to 1917.

Ohio State won its first game against Michigan in 1919. Led by All-American Chic Harley, the Buckeyes defeated the Wolverines 13–3 at Ferry Field. The Buckeyes won three straight games against Michigan from 1919 to 1921.

The 1922 game drew intense interest as it was the dedication game for Ohio Stadium and also because of Michigan's three-game losing streak against the Buckeyes. Animosity was also fueled by rumors that Ohio State officials had instigated a Big Ten investigation into the eligibility of Michigan halfback, Doug Roby. A large crowd gathered at the Ann Arbor train station as the Michigan team departed, and Coach Yost spoke briefly, assuring the crowd that the team was "ready for anything the Buckeyes offer." A total of 16,000 Michigan supporters traveled in special Pullman cars and by automobile to Columbus for the game. One newspaper reported on the exodus as follows:

"Automobile parties will start from Ann Arbor on Friday and will form a steady parade between here and Columbus. Students by the hundreds have purchased second hand cars to make the trip and it is expected that these old broken down flivvers will greatly exceed the number of higher price cars."

Michigan won, 19–0, in a game that The New York Times wrote had "crowned the greatest day in mid Western football history." Harry Kipke scored two touchdowns, kicked a field goal and intercepted two passes. The rotunda at Ohio Stadium was painted with maize flowers on a blue background due to the outcome of the 1922 dedication game.

The Wolverines went on to win six consecutive games against the Buckeyes from 1922 to 1927, including the dedication game for Michigan Stadium in 1927. Over the 28 years of the Yost era, Michigan's record against Ohio State was 18-4-1.

=== Penn ===
Michigan's most significant rivalry during its independent years was with the Penn Quakers football team representing the University of Pennsylvania. The two schools played every year from 1906 to 1917 as either the final or penultimate game of the season. Penn was one of the dominant football programs of the era, winning seven national championships between 1894 and 1912 (including the 1908 national championship). During the Yost era, Michigan compiled a 4-6-2 record against the Quakers—one of the few teams against which Yost had a losing record.

The first Penn game of the Yost era occurred in 1906. The Quakers shut out the Wolverines, 17–0, before a crowd of nearly 26,000 spectators at Franklin Field in Philadelphia. The start of the game was delayed by half an hour after Yost sought a ruling that Penn's "tackle back" play (in which the tackle dropped back into the backfield as a ball carrier) was illegal under the new rules. The referee, Kelly, agreed with Yost and informed the Pennsylvania team. The Quakers refused to take the field in light of the ruling, and twenty minutes of wrangling followed. Yost reported that the umpire finally approached and said, "Now, Mr. Yost, you act the gentleman and go on the field." Controversy continued when a Penn player shoved Michigan captain John Garrels to the ground after he had punted. The Chicago Daily Tribune wrote that "Gaston slugged Garrels, knocking the big acting captain 'silly' for a few minutes and dazing him for the entire half." After the game, Michigan's trainer, Keene Fitzpatrick noted that "Garrels' face is badly disfigured for the time being." In the Detroit Free Press, Joe S. Jackson wrote that Michigan fans considered the game the first real loss ever suffered by a Yost-coached team, the 2–0 loss to Chicago in 1905 having been dismissed as a fluke. Jackson noted, "However, Ann Arbor may now cut out the proud boast referred to. For a Yost-coached team was beaten today, and it was beaten good."

The teams met at Ferry Field in Ann Arbor for a rematch at the end of the 1907 season. Penn again prevailed, this time by a 6–0 score. The loss was the first sustained by Michigan at Ferry Field. A controversial ruling declaring a Michigan pass illegal resulted in a Michigan touchdown being called back.

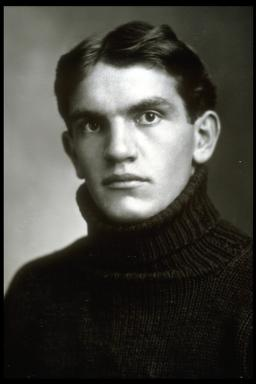
Germany Schulz in 1907

The 1908 Penn game solidified the reputation of Michigan center Germany Schulz as one of the toughest players ever to play the game. Michigan lost the game, 29–0, the worst defeat suffered by a Michigan team during the Yost era. However, much of the press coverage focused for years afterward on Schulz's courageous performance. The Toledo Blade wrote that the Penn players, knowing that Schulz was "the power in the Michigan game", pummeled him throughout the game: "Every time Schultz started anywhere he would find a couple of Penn men digging headfirst into his stomach. They would elbow him, jam him with the straight arm, and if he went to the ground in a scrimmage there generally would be a knee grinding him in the wind." Yost said of Schulz's performance: "He gave the greatest one-man exhibition of courage I ever saw on a football field." From the 1920s through the 1950s, the story was told, re-told and likely embellished in columns by Grantland Rice and others. According to one account, Schulz refused to leave the game: "It was a scene I shall never forget—the giant Schulz, towering above the rest of the combatants, literally dragged off the field, tears streaming down his mud-spattered cheeks as he frantically protested his removal from the game." Another account, published in 1951, reported that Schulz played with the "strength of Samson", and Penn "put five men -- center, both guards and both tackles—on the Wolverine giant", and the game was scoreless until Schulz was "carried from the field."

The Wolverines finally defeated the Quakers in 1909 by a score of 12–6. Penn had won the 1908 national championship and was in the midst of a 23-game winning streak. The game marked the first time a Western team had defeated one of the "Big Four" (Harvard, Yale, Princeton and Penn) which had dominated the sport of college football since the game originated almost 40 years earlier. Right halfback Joe Magidsohn scored both of Michigan's touchdowns within the first ten minutes of the start of the game. Magidsohn was also the first Jewish player to win a varsity "M" at the University of Michigan.

After playing to a scoreless tie in 1910, Michigan defeated Penn for the second time in the series in 1911 by a score of 11–9. The 1911 game was played in an icy blizzard at Ferry Field. The New York Times described the play that resulted in the winning touchdown as a "trick play" in which the Michigan blockers started to the right with Penn's defense following. The ball was the tossed to Jimmy Craig far to the left side of the field. The Times called Craig Michigan's "offensive and defensive hero" in a "clean, snappy, spectacular, thrilling" game.

The Wolverines lost to Penn in 1912, but rebounded with a 13–0 victory in 1913. The 1913 Michiganensian (the University of Michigan yearbook) devoted four full pages to an account of the Penn game and concluded: "That glorious triumph will go down the vista of the years as one of the greatest and most satisfactory tributes paid to Yost genius, and the undying spirit at Michigan." Playing in his last game for Michigan, Jimmy Craig scored both Michigan touchdowns and intercepted a pass at midfield. Two days after the game, E. A. Batchelor reflected on the game and concluded that the victory was "a splendid example of what good coaching in the fundamentals of football will do for a team." He opined that the blocking was the best ever seen on Ferry Field and "as near perfect as anything in the line of football could be."

In 1914, Michigan won its most decisive victory over Penn during the Yost era, outscoring the Quakers 34 to 3. John Maulbetsch, who was known as the "Featherweight Fullback" due to his small size, scored two touchdowns in the game. From 1915 to 1917, the teams met three more times, playing to a scoreless tie in 1915 and Penn winning the games of 1916 and 1917.

=== Vanderbilt ===
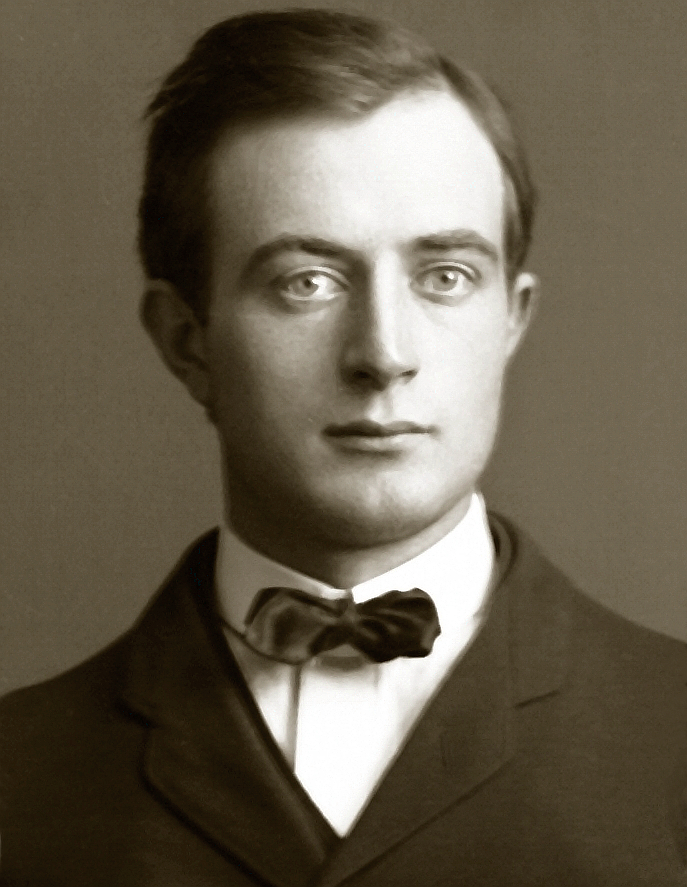
Dan McGugin as an assistant coach at Michigan in 1903

During the Yost era, Michigan also developed the first inter-sectional rivalry with a team from the South—the Vanderbilt Commodores. The rivalry was based on a close personal relationship between Yost and Vanderbilt coach Dan McGugin. McGugin had played for Yost on the 1901 and 1902 "Point-a-Minute" teams and was an assistant coach for the 1903 team. McGugin also married the sister of Yost's wife, making the two brothers-in-law. In 1904, McGugin became the head football coach at Vanderbilt where he built the Commodores into one of the leading football programs in the country. Between 1905 and 1923, Michigan and Vanderbilt played nine games with Michigan winning eight of the games. The most famous game in the Michigan-Vanderbilt series was the 1922 game in which undefeated teams from both schools played to a scoreless tie. The 1922 game was also the official dedication game for Vanderbilt's new stadium, Dudley Field, the first large athletic stadium in the South.

== Stadiums ==
Michigan played its home games in three different stadiums during the Yost era as follows:

- Regents Field was the home field for the University of Michigan football team from 1893 to 1905. It was located along South State Street in Ann Arbor, Michigan, where Schembechler Hall stands today.
- Ferry Field was home to the Michigan football games from 1906 to 1926. It had a capacity of 46,000. After football games moved to Michigan Stadium in 1927, Ferry Field was converted to an outdoor track and field facility.
- Michigan Stadium was opened in 1927 and has been the home of Michigan football ever since. Fashioned after the Yale Bowl, Michigan Stadium was built with an original capacity of 72,000. At Yost's urging, 10,000 temporary bleachers were added at the top of the stadium, increasing capacity to 82,000. On October 1, 1927, Michigan played Ohio Wesleyan in the first game at Michigan Stadium, prevailing easily, 33–0. The new stadium was formally dedicated three weeks later in a contest against Ohio State on October 22. Michigan beat the Buckeyes 21–0 before a standing-room-only crowd of 84,401.

== Culture and lore ==
=== Biff, the Michigan Wolverine ===
For a short time during the Yost era, the Michigan football team had a live wolverine mascot named "Biff, the Michigan Wolverine." In 1923, after seeing the University of Wisconsin football team carry live badgers at games, Coach Yost decided to procure a wolverine. Despite writing letters to 68 trappers, Yost was reportedly unable to find a wolverine. The best he could do in 1924 was to obtain a mounted and stuffed wolverine from the Hudson's Bay Company.

In 1927, the Detroit Zoo acquired ten wolverines from Alaska. Yost struck a deal with the zoo to have two of the wolverines transported to Ann Arbor on football Saturdays. The two wolverines were nicknamed "Biff" and "Bennie" and were paraded around Michigan Stadium during football games. Biff and Bennie's first appearance came on dedication day for Michigan Stadium in 1927. As Biff and Bennie "grew larger and more ferocious", Yost joked, "It was obvious that the Michigan mascots had designs on the Michigan men toting them, and those designs were by no means friendly." Accordingly, the practice of bringing Biff and Bennie into the stadium ended after just one season. An article in National Geographic magazine reported that "Yost had not accounted for the rapid growth or the ferocity of the animals, and when his players were no longer willing to carry the wolverines around the stadium, one live mascot, 'Biff,' was turned over to the University of Michigan Zoo so that the students would be able to visit—and be inspired by—him."

=== Fight songs ===
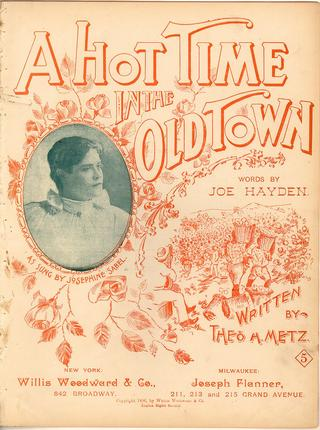
Michigan's school song in the early 1900s.

The Michigan football team had a number of songs associated with it during the Yost era. The current fight song, "The Victors", was composed by Michigan student Louis Elbel in 1898 following a last-minute football victory over the University of Chicago. Despite its popularity in later years, "The Victors" was not an immediate hit. According to a longtime historian of Michigan music matters, "it had disappeared from campus" from 1900 to 1909.

The songs played most frequently at Michigan football games during the first decade of the Yost era were "The Yellow and Blue" (with lyrics by Michigan English and Latin professor, Charles Mills Gayley) and a version of the popular ragtime song, "There'll Be a Hot Time in the Old Town Tonight" with special Michigan lyrics. The latter was considered to be Michigan's school song during the early 1900s.

"The Victors", with its reference to Michigan as the "champions of the West" also lost its appeal after Michigan withdrew from the Western Conference. A new fight song called "Varsity", written by Michigan students Earl V. Moore and J. Fred Lawton, debuted in October 1911. When Michigan rejoined the Conference in 1917, "The Victors" began to be played again. However, it was not until the 1920s that "The Victors" was played more often than "Varsity."

=== First radio broadcast ===
On October 25, 1924, WWJ radio in Detroit conducted the first live broadcast of a Michigan football game, a 21–0 victory over Wisconsin. The announcers for the game were Ty Tyson and Leonard "Doc" Holland who were required to pay for tickets and set up their microphone in the stands of the east end zone. According to the Bentley Historical Library at the University of Michigan, radio stations had previously broadcast recreations of football games, but the 1924 Michigan-Wisconsin game was "believed to be the first 'live' broadcast originating directly from a football stadium." Tyson and Holland continued to broadcast Michigan football games on WWJ radio for many years. Tyson also broadcast the first regularly scheduled baseball game and has been called "the world's first sports broadcaster."

== Year-by-year results ==
Season	Head coach	Conference	Place	Record	PF	PA
1901 team	Fielding H. Yost	Western Conference	T–1st	11–0 (4–0 Western Conf.)	550	0
1902 team	Yost	Western Conference	1st	11–0 (5–0 Western Conf.)	644	12
1903 team	Yost	Western Conference	T–1st	11–0–1 (3–0–1 Western Conf.)	565	6
1904 team	Yost	Western Conference	T–1st	10–0 (2–0 Western Conf.)	567	22
1905 team	Yost	Western Conference	2nd	12–1 (2–1 Western Conf.)	495	2
1906 team	Yost	Western Conference	T–1st	4–1 (1–0 Western Conf.)	72	30
1907 team	Yost	Independent	na	5–1	107	6
1908 team	Yost	Independent	na	5–2–1	128	81
1909 team	Yost	Independent	na	6–1	115	34
1910 team	Yost	Independent	na	3–0–3	29	9
1911 team	Yost	Independent	na	5–1–2	90	38
1912 team	Yost	Independent	na	5–2	158	65
1913 team	Yost	Independent	na	6–1	175	21
1914 team	Yost	Independent	na	6–3	233	68
1915 team	Yost	Independent	na	4–3–1	130	81
1916 team	Yost	Independent	na	7–2	253	56
1917 team	Yost	Big Ten Conference	8th	8–2 (0–1 Big Ten)	304	53
1918 team	Yost	Big Ten Conference	T–1st	5–0 (2–0 Big Ten)	96	6
1919 team	Yost	Big Ten Conference	7th	3–4 (1–4 Big Ten)	93	102
1920 team	Yost	Big Ten Conference	6th	5–2 (2–2 Big Ten)	121	21
1921 team	Yost	Big Ten Conference	5th	5–1–1 (2–1–1 Big Ten)	187	21
1922 team	Yost	Big Ten Conference	T–1st	6–0–1 (4–0 Big Ten)	183	13
1923 team	Yost	Big Ten Conference	T–1st	8–0 (4–0 Big Ten)	150	12
1924 team	George Little	Big Ten Conference	4th	6–2 (4–2 Big Ten)	155	54
1925 team	Yost	Big Ten Conference	1st	7–1 (5–1 Big Ten)	227	3
1926 team	Yost	Big Ten Conference	T–1st	7–1 (5–0 Big Ten)	191	38
1927 team	Tad Wieman	Big Ten Conference	3rd	6–2 (3–2 Big Ten)	137	39
1928 team	Wieman	Big Ten Conference	8th	3–4–1 (2–3 Big Ten)	36	62

== Coaches and administrators ==
=== Head coaching records ===
#	Name	Term	GC	W	L	T	%
1	Fielding H. Yost	1901–1923, 1925–1926	204	165	29	10	.833
2	George Little	1924	8	6	2	0	.750
3	Tad Wieman	1927–1928	16	9	6	1	.594

=== Assistant coaches and trainers ===
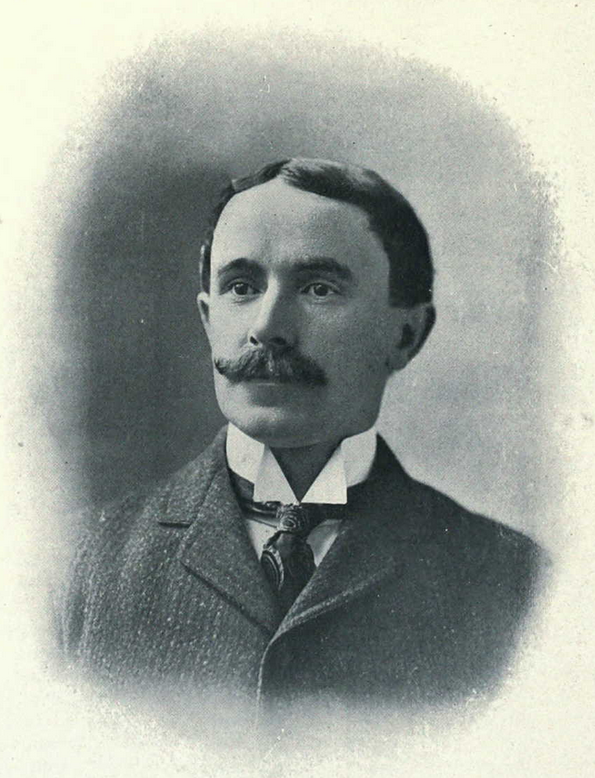
Keene Fitzpatrick in 1904

- Ray Courtright – assistant football coach at Michigan 1927–1928; head golf coach 1929–1944
- Harvey Emery – assistant athletic director and assistant football coach
- Stephen Farrell – Farrell was Michigan's football trainer, holding the position from 1912 to 1915. He had been a professional foot-racer in the 1880s and 1890s. He was the first American to win England's Sheffield Cup on two occasions and became known as the country's greatest professional footracer. Farrell also performed with the Barnum & Bailey Circus racing against a horse and never lost to the horse. Farrell was also the track coach at Michigan for 18 years, developing many great athletes, including DeHart Hubbard and Eddie Tolan.
- Keene Fitzpatrick – an American track coach, athletic trainer, professor of physical training and gymnasium director for 42 years at Yale University (1890–1891, 1896–1898), the University of Michigan (1894–1895, 1898–1910), and Princeton University (1910–1932). He trained Michigan's 1894 and 1895 football teams which compiled a 17–2–1 record and outscored opponents 510 to 98. He left Michigan for two years but returned in 1898. Upon his return, he was the trainer of Michigan's undefeated football team in 1898 and the "Point-a-Minute" teams from 1901 to 1905. Fitzpatrick was Michigan's track coach from 1900 to 1910, and during those years, Fitzpatrick's teams won Western Conference track championships in 1900, 1901, 1902, 1903, 1904, and 1906. During his tenure as track coach, Michigan track and field athletes won 15 Olympic medals, including 7 gold medals.
- Charles B. Hoyt – football trainer; also coach of the Michigan track team from 1923 to 1939
- Ray Fisher – assistant football coach at Michigan starting in 1921; also head baseball coach for 38 years; played MLB from 1910 to 1920
- Archie Hahn – trainer of the football team; won four gold medals as a sprinter at the 1904 and 1906 Summer Olympics
- Forrest M. Hall – assistant coach at Michigan in 1909
- Judson Hyames – assistant football coach at Michigan in 1926; head baseball coach at Western Michigan University from 1922 to 1936
- Cliff Keen – assistant football coach starting in 1926; head coach of the University of Michigan collegiate wrestling team from 1925 to 1970. He led the Michigan Wolverines to 13 Big Ten Conference championships, and coached 68 All-American wrestlers. In 1976, he was one of the initial inductees into the National Wrestling Hall of Fame.
- Alvin Kraenzlein – He was Michigan's sixth football trainer, holding the position from 1910 to 1911. He was principally known as the first athlete to win four Olympic titles in a single Olympic Games. As of 2012, he is still the only track and field athlete to have done so in individual events only.
- Carl Lundgren – assistant football coach in 1919; also head baseball coach at Michigan; played MLB from 1902 to 1909
- E. J. Mather – assistant football coach starting in 1910; also head basketball coach at Michigan 1919–1928
- Elmer Mitchell – freshman football coach at Michigan; also considered the father of intramural sports. He was the first varsity basketball coach at the University of Michigan and the founder of that school's intramural sports program.
- Bennie Owen – assistant football coach at Michigan in 1901; head coach at Oklahoma 1905–1926; inducted into the College Football Hall of Fame
- Del Pratt – assistant football coach at Michigan starting in 1920; played MLB from 1912 to 1924
- A. J. Sturzenegger – played college football and baseball at the University of Nebraska. He later served as an assistant football coach at the University of Michigan (1920–1923), University of Southern California (1924), and UCLA (1925–1948). He was also the head coach of the UCLA Bruins baseball team from 1927 to 1931, in 1933, and again from 1943 to 1945.
- Leigh C. Turner – assistant football coach at Michigan in 1905; head coach at Purdue in 1907
- George F. Veenker – assistant football coach 1928–1929; head basketball coach at the University of Michigan from 1928 to 1931
- Robert William Watson (born April 20, 1893) – He grew up in Ludington, Michigan, and attended the University of Michigan. He played at the guard and tackle positions for Michigan from 1913 to 1915. After graduating from Michigan, Watson served as an assistant football coach at Michigan in 1917 and 1920.

=== Athletic directors and administrators ===
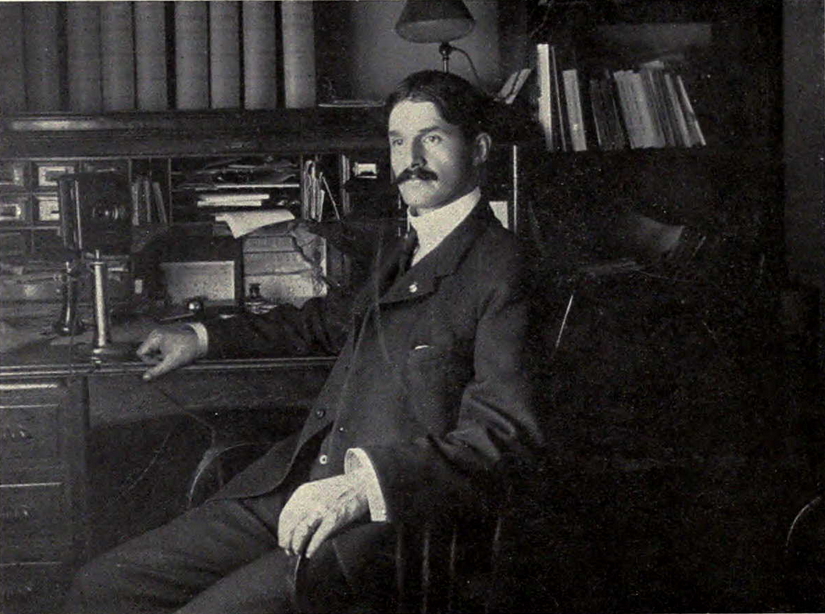
Charles A. Baird in 1903.

- James Burrill Angell – Angell served as president of the University of Michigan from 1871 to 1909. Under his leadership, Michigan gained prominence as an elite public university. In 1905, he headed the Angell Conferences established to reform college football.
- Ralph W. Aigler—Aigler was a law professor at Michigan from 1910 to 1954. He served as the chairman of Michigan's Faculty Board in Control of Athletics from 1917 to 1942 and its faculty representative to the Big Ten Conference from 1917 to 1955. Aigler led Michigan back into the Big Ten Conference in 1917, led the effort to construct Michigan Stadium and Yost Fieldhouse, negotiated the Big Ten's exclusive contract with the Rose Bowl starting in 1946, hired Fritz Crisler as football coach and athletic director, and acted as a spokesman for the University and Big Ten for many years on NCAA rules and eligibility issues. He was inducted into the University of Michigan Athletic Hall of Honor in 1982.
- Charles A. Baird – Baird was Michigan's first athletic director, holding the position from 1898 to 1909. He hired Fielding Yost in 1901, built the largest college athletic ground in the United States, and negotiated the school's appearance in the first Rose Bowl game. In 1935, he donated Baird Carillon to University of Michigan.
- Philip Bartelme – Bartelme was Michigan's second athletic director, holding the position from 1909 to 1921. Bartelme is credited with bringing the sports of basketball, hockey and swimming to varsity status at Michigan and with leading Michigan back into the Big Ten Conference after its withdrawal in 1907.

== Players ==
Name	Start Year	Last Year	Position(s)	Notes
Dave Allerdice	1907	1909	Halfback	All-American in 1909; later served as the head football coach at Butler University (1910) and the University of Texas at Austin (1911–1915); died after a house fire during the 1941 Christmas holiday; posthumously inducted into the Longhorn Hall of Honor in 1981.
Ernest Allmendinger	1911	1913	Guard	All-Western in 1913; chosen for Walter Camp's All-Service team in 1917.
Dick Babcock	1922	1925	Tackle	Later served as head football coach at Akron 1926) and Cincinnati (1927–1930); also Cincinnati's athletic director from 1928 to 1932.
Ted Bank	1919	1921	Quarterback	Michigan's starting quarterback 1920–1921; later served as head baseball coach at Tulane (1930–1932), head football coach at Idaho (1935–1940), chief of U.S. Army athletic operations during World War II, and president of the Athletic Institute of American (1945–1966).
Roy Beechler	1904	1904	Center, tackle	Later served as head football coach at Mt. Union (1905); co-founded Vulcan Motor Axle Co. in 1920.
Albert Benbrook	1908	1910	Guard	Chosen by Walter Camp as an All-American in 1909 and 1910; considered one of the best college football linemen in the early years of the sport; elected to the College Football Hall of Fame in 1971.
Rolla Bigelow	1902	1903	Halfback, fullback, tackle	Subsequently, founded the Bigelow & Co investment banking firm and Eastern Exchange Bank, both in New York
Jack Blott	1922	1923	Center	All-American, 1923; played center and place kicker for Michigan in football and catcher for baseball team; played for the Cincinnati Reds in 1924; Michigan's line coach from 1924 to 1933 and 1946–1958; head football coach at Wesleyan 1934–1940.
Thomas A. Bogle, Jr.	1910	1911	Center, guard, tackle	Later served as head football coach at DePauw University from 1913 to 1914.
Stanley Borleske	1908	1910	End	Later served as head football coach at North Dakota State (1919–1921, 1923–1924, 1928) and at Fresno State (1929–1932); his 1930 Fresno State team is one of only three in program history to complete a season undefeated; also coached basketball at North Dakota State (1919–1922) and at Fresno State (1934–1939). He selected the bison as North Dakota State's mascot.
Alan Bovard	1926	1929	Center	All-Big Ten center in 1929; later served as the athletic director at Michigan Tech (1947–1972) and head football coach (1947–1956).
Robert J. Brown	1923	1925	Center	Captain of the 1925 Michigan team that Yost called the greatest team he ever coached; later served on the Board of Regents of the University of Michigan from 1967 to 1974. His son, Robert M. Brown, was captain of the 1962 Michigan team, giving them the distinction of being the only father and son football players for the University of Michigan who also served as team captains.
Franklin Cappon	1920	1922	Fullback, halfback, end, tackle	All-Western, 1921; 2nd-team All-American 1922; played football and basketball at Phillips University and the Michigan; coached basketball and football at Luther College (1923–1924), the University of Kansas (1926–1927), the University of Michigan (1925, 1928–1938), and Princeton University (1938–1961); won five Ivy League basketball championships with his trademark "five-man weave" offense; inducted into the Helms Foundation College Basketball Hall of Fame in 1957.
Otto Carpell	1909	1912	Halfback	Later became an aviation combat pilot during World War I and was one of four Michigan football players to be killed in the war.
Charles B. Carter	1902	1904	Guard	Nicknamed "Babe", he was the starting right guard on the Michigan's 1902 and 1904 "Point-a-Minute" football teams; later became a lawyer in Maine and served in the Maine Senate.
William Dennison Clark	1903	1905	Halfback, fullback, end	Tackled for a safety in a 2–0 loss to Chicago in 1905, ending a 56-game unbeaten streak. He committed suicide at a hotel in Salem, Oregon, in 1932, with some press accounts reporting that the suicide was intended to "atone" for his error in the 1905 loss to Chicago.
William D. Cochran	1913	1915	Tackle, guard	All-Western lineman and captain of Michigan's 1915 football team; later operated a freight trucking line based in the Upper Peninsula of Michigan; also served as a director of the Federal Reserve Bank of Minneapolis from 1936 to 1950, including five years as the Deputy Chairman from 1946 to 1950.
Abe Cohn	1917	1920	Halfback, fullback, end	Played football and basketball at Michigan from 1917 to 1920; coached football and basketball at Whitworth College (1921–1922) and at Spokane University from (1923–1924); also served as an official for the Pacific Coast Conference and the supervisor of the Washington State Liquor Board's licensing bureau from 1934 to 1968.
William C. "King" Cole	1902	1902	Tackle, end	Later became the head football coach at Marietta College (1903), University of Virginia (1905–1906), and University of Nebraska (1907–1910); led the Nebraska Cornhuskers to two Missouri Valley Intercollegiate Athletic Association championships.
Frederick L. Conklin	1909	1911	End, tackle, guard	All-Western player in 1911; later spent 32 years as an officer in the U.S. Navy, reaching the rank of Rear Admiral after serving in World War I and World War II; received the Legion of Honor for establishing a mobile hospital in New Caledonia in 1942; presented John F. Kennedy with a Navy and Marine Corps Medal for heroism in rescuing members of the crew of the PT 109.
James B. Craig	1911	1913	Halfback, quarterback	All-American in 1913; broke the world indoor record running the 49-yard (45 m) high hurdles in 1911; won the low hurdles competition in the 1912 Eastern Inter-Collegiate Athletic Association; later served as the athletic director and head football coach at the Arkansas from 1919 to 1920; brother Ralph Craig won gold medals in the 100 and 200-meter events at the 1912 Olympics.
Maurice E. Crumpacker	1907	1908	Tackle, guard	Later served a U.S. Congressman from Oregon (1925–1927).
Frank Culver	1917	1919	Guard, tackle, center	All-American 1917; later practiced as an attorney and chief assistant prosecutor in Detroit for many years; died in the courtroom in 1956.
Joe Curtis	1903	1906	Tackle	All-Western tackle three consecutive years from 1904 to 1906 and All-American in 1904 and 1905; later served as head football coach at Tulane University (1907–1908) and Colorado School of Mines (1909).
James DePree	1903	1904	Fullback	Later served as the head football coach at Tennessee (1905–1906).
Prentiss Douglass	1907	1908	Halfback	Later served as an assistant football coach at Michigan (1909–1910, 1912–1919) and as the head football coach at the University of Kentucky (1911).
Leo Draveling	1928	1930	End, tackle	Later played for the Cincinnati Reds of the NFL in 1933.
David L. Dunlap	1901	1905	End, halfback	Later served as head football coach and athletic director at Kenyon College (1906), University of North Dakota (1908–1911), Allegheny College (1912); also coached basketball and baseball at North Dakota and basketball at Allegheny.
Robert J. Dunne	1918	1921	End, guard	Later served as line coach at Northwestern (1923–1925), Harvard (1926–1930), and the University of Chicago (1935); served as a state court judge in Illinois from 1931 to 1976 and as the presiding judge of Chicago's probate court for his last 20 years on the bench.
William P. Edmunds	1908	1910	Tackle, guard, fullback	All-Western in 1910; later served as head football coach at West Virginia (1912), Washington University (1913–1916), Vermont (1919).
Tom Edwards	1924	1925	Tackle, guard	All-American in 1925; played professional football for the New York Yankees and Detroit Panthers in 1926.
Edgar N. Eisenhower	1912	1912	Reserve	Older brother of U.S. President Dwight Eisenhower
William Fortune	1917	1919	Guard, tackle	Later played professional football for the Chicago Cardinals in 1920 and the Hammond Pros from 1924 to 1925.
Benny Friedman	1924	1926	Quarterback, halfback	First-team All-American and Big Ten Most Valuable Player in 1926; played professional football for the Cleveland Bulldogs (1927), Detroit Wolverines (1928), New York Giants (1929–1931), and Brooklyn Dodgers (1932–1934); considered the first great passer in professional football; coached the New York Giants (1930), Brooklyn Dodgers (1932), and Brandeis University (1951–1959); inducted into the College Football Hall of Fame (1951) and Pro Football Hall of Fame (2005).
John Garrels	1904	1906	End, fullback	Silver medalist in 110 meter hurdles at 1908 Summer Olympics; Bronze medalist in shot put
Louis Gilbert	1925	1927	Halfback	1927 All-Big Ten 1st team
Paul G. Goebel	1920	1922	End	All-American 1921; Played 4 years in the NFL with the Tigers and Yankees; Later served as mayor of Grand Rapids and University of Michigan Regent
Angus Goetz	1917	1920	Tackle	Second-team All-American 1920; Played professional football with the Buffalo All-Americans and Columbus Tigers
Cecil Gooding	1902	1903	Guard	Died of typhoid fever contracted during a Thanksgiving football game in 1903; first Michigan football player to die while a student
Walter "Octy" Graham	1904	1907	Guard, tackle	One of the stars of the "Point-a-Minute" teams of 1904 and 1905
Herb Graver	1901	1903	End, halfback, fullback, quarterback	Played for Yost's "Point-a-Minute" teams; Scored 5 touchdowns against Ohio State in 1903; Later served as head football coach at Marietta
Bruce Gregory	1924	1925	Halfback	Played 1 season in the NFL with the Detroit Panthers
George W. Gregory	1901	1903	Center	Starting center for "Point-a-Minute" teams; head coach at Kenyon (1905)
Charles Grube	1923	1925	End	Played 1 season in the NFL with the Detroit Panthers
Thomas S. Hammond	1903	1905	End, halfback, fullback, tackle	Played for the "Point-a-Minute" teams; later served as head coach at Ole Miss; became President of Whiting Corporation
Harry Hawkins	1923	1925	Tackle, guard	Won the NCAA championship in the hammer throw in 1926; First-team All-Western football player 1925
Guy T. Helvering	1905	1905		Later served in U.S. Congress and as a U.S. District Court Judge
Albert E. Herrnstein	1899	1902	Halfback, end	Scored 6 touchdowns against Ohio State in 1902; Played on "Point-a-Minute" teams; Later served as head football coach at Haskell, Purdue and Ohio State
Willie Heston	1901	1904	Halfback	Picked by Fielding Yost as the greatest player of all-time; Inducted into College Football Hall of Fame in 1954; Served as head football coach at Drake and N.C. State; Became a judge in Detroit
Tommy Hughitt	1912	1913	Quarterback, halfback	Played professional football from 1917 to 1924 for Buffalo and Youngstown
Emory J. Hyde	1901	1901	Reserve	Later served as head football coach at TCU, 1905–1907
Efton James	1912	1914	End	One of three Michigan football players killed in World War I
Harry James	1903	1903	Quarterback	Starting quarterback on the 1903 "Point-a-Minute" team
James Edward Johns	1920	1922	Guard, tackle	Later played professional football for the Cleveland Indians in 1923 and Minnesota Marines in 1924.
Paul J. Jones	1902	1902	Fullback	Starter for the 1902 "Point-a-Minute" team; head football coach at Western Reserve; U.S. District Court Judge in Ohio from 1923 to 1965
Jackson Keefer	1922	1922	Halfback	Later played college football at Brown University and professional football for the Providence Steam Roller (1926) and Dayton Triangles (1928); inducted into the Brown University Athletic Hall of Fame in 1971 and selected as one of four backs on the 125th Anniversary All-Time Brown Football Team.
Harry Kipke	1920	1923	Halfback	All-American, 1922–1923; played football, basketball and baseball at Michigan; served as Michigan's head coach, 1929–1937; coached national championship teams, 1932–1933; inducted into College Football Hall of Fame, 1958; Walter Camp Man of the Year, 1970.
Bernard Kirk	1921	1922	End	All-American, 1921–1922; died in December 1922 as a result of injuries sustained in automobile accident.
James Knight	1901	1901	End	Later served as head coach at Washington, 1902–1905
Kenneth Knode	1918	1918	Quarterback	Starting quarterback for Michigan's 1918 national championship team; later played Major League Baseball for the St. Louis Cardinals as "Mike" Knode
Robert Knode	1921	1922	Quarterback	Later played Major League Baseball for the Cleveland Indians as "Ray" Knode
Walt Kreinheder	1920	1921	Center, guard	Later played professional football for the Akron Pros, St. Louis All-Stars, and Cleveland Bulldogs from 1922 to 1925; selected as a first-team All-NFL player by Collyers Eye Magazine in 1923.
Horace LaBissoniere			Center, guard	Played for the Hammond Pros in 1922
Jesse R. Langley	1904	1907		Head football coach at TCU, 1908–1909
James E. Lawrence	1902	1902	Placekicker, fullback, tackle	Scored 113 points for the 1902 "Point-a-Minute" team
Belford Lawson, Jr.	1921	1923		Second African-American to be a member of a Michigan football team; became a leading attorney in the Civil Rights Movement from the 1930s to the 1960s
George M. Lawton	1908	1910	Fullback, punter	Later served as head football coach, University of Detroit, 1913–1914
Frank Longman	1903	1905	Fullback	Later head football coach at Arkansas and Notre Dame
Alvin Loucks	1916	1919	Guard	Later played professional football for the Detroit Heralds in 1920; head football coach at Escanaba, Michigan, where his 1922 football team won the football championship of the Upper Peninsula; later served as a football coach at Duluth Junior College.
Jay Mack Love	1904	1905	Guard	Later head coach at Southwestern (Kansas)
Joe Maddock	1902	1903	Tackle	All-Western player in 1902 and 1903; set a Western Conference record in the hammer throw; later served as a head football coach at the University of Utah (1904–1909).
Joe Magidsohn	1909	1910	Halfback	Selected as a second-team All-American by Walter Camp in 1909 and a first-team All-American in 1910. He was the first Jewish athlete to win a varsity "M" at the University of Michigan and is the first athlete known to have refused to compete on the Jewish High Holy Days.
Paul Magoffin	1904	1907	Halfback	Captain of the 1907 team; later served as a football coach at North Dakota State University and George Washington University.
Dutch Marion	1923	1924	End	Later played professional American football player for the Detroit Panthers (1925–1926).
John Maulbetsch	1914	1916	Halfback, fullback	All-American 1914; Known as the "Human Bullet" and "Featherweight Fullback"; served as head football coach at Phillips, Oklahoma St. and Marshall
Dan McGugin	1901	1902	Guard	Played on "Point-a-Minute" teams; brother-in-law of Fielding H. Yost; Head football coach at Vanderbilt 1904–1934; inducted into the College Football Hall of Fame in 1951
Shorty McMillan	1910	1911	Quarterback	McMillan started only ten games at quarterback, but never lost a game he started. The Wolverines' record in games with McMillan as the starting quarterback was 7–0–3.
Frank Millard	1912	1915	Guard	Later served as Michigan Attorney General and General Counsel of the U.S. Army
James Joy Miller	1907	1909	End, halfback, quarterback	Elected captain of the 1910 team, but after it was discovered that he had played in 1909 without registering for or attending classes during the fall semester, he was expelled in January 1910. Joy disappeared for several months during and after the investigation and expulsion and was discovered in March 1910 wandering in western Canada. Joy claimed to have lost all memory of his identity and past events.
Bo Molenda	1925	1926	Fullback	Played 9 seasons in the NFL
Meyer Morton	1910	1910		The annual Meyer Morton Award is named after him
Stanley Muirhead	1921	1923	Tackle	Second-team All-American in both 1922 and 1923.; later played professional football in 1924 for the Dayton Triangles and Cleveland Bulldogs and was selected as a first-team All-NFL player.
Walter Niemann	1915	1916	Center	Played for the Green Bay Packers, 1922–1924
Fred Norcross	1903	1905	Quarterback	Later served as head football coach at Oregon State, 1906–1908
Bennie Oosterbaan	1925	1927	End	Three-time All-American in football and two-time All-American in basketball; All-Big Ten in baseball; selected by Sports Illustrated in 2003 as the fourth greatest athlete in the history of the State of Michigan and one of the eleven greatest college football players of the first century of the game (ending in 1968); later served as head coach of Michigan's basketball (1938–1946) and football (1948–1958) teams; his 1948 Michigan team was undefeated and recognized as national champions.
Bill Orwig	1928	1928	End	Later served as the athletic director at the University of Toledo, University of Nebraska (1954–1960), and Indiana University (1961–1975); hired Bobby Knight as the head basketball coach at Indiana; inducted into the Halls of Fame at Indiana, Michigan and Toledo.
George C. Paterson	1911	1913	Center	Nicknamed "Bubbles", an All-American in 1913.In 1947, the "George Cornell 'Bubbles' Paterson Award" was established. Between 1947 and 1966, the award was given to the leading athlete-scholar on the Michigan football team.
John Perrin	1917	1921	Halfback	Later played Major League Baseball for the Boston Red Sox in 1921 and professional football for the Hartford Blues of the National Football League in 1926.
Frank Albert Picard	1909	1911	Quarterback	Later appointed as a U.S. District Court Judge by Franklin Roosevelt; served 24 years in that capacity
Otto Pommerening	1927	1928	Tackle	All-American and team MVP, 1928
Miller Pontius	1911	1913	Tackle, end	All-American, 1913
Curtis Redden	1900	1903	End	Died while serving in Germany during World War I
Arthur Redner	1900	1901	Halfback	Last-surviving member of Yost's 1901 Point-a-Minute team
Fred Rehor	1914	1916	Guard	Played for the 1917 world's professional football champion Massillon Tigers
Andrew G. Reid	1901	1901	Fullback	Later served as head football coach and athletic director at Monmouth College, 1907–1910
Lewis Reimann	1914	1915	Tackle, guard	Later founded the University of Michigan Fresh Air Camp for underprivileged boys in 1921; also founded Camp Charlevoix in 1927 which he operated until 1948; wrote several books on the history of the Upper Peninsula and the Gogebic Range in the 1950s; ran unsuccessfully as a Democratic Party candidate for Mayor of Ann Arbor in 1951 and for a seat in the Michigan State Senate in 1954.
Walter Rheinschild	1904	1907	Tackle, fullback	Later served as head football coach at Washington State, Occidental
Thomas J. Riley	1908	1908	Guard	Head football coach at Maine (1911–1913), Amherst (1914–1916)
Doug Roby	1921	1922	Fullback, halfback	Played football at Phillips University and Michigan; worked in the automobile business (1923–1963); served as president of the Amateur Athletic Union (1951–1953) and as vice president (1953–65) and president (1965–68) of the United States Olympic Committee and one of two American members of the International Olympic Committee (1952–84). As president of the USOC in 1968, expelled Tommie Smith and John Carlos after their raised-fist Black Power salute during a medal ceremony.
Tod Rockwell	1923	1924	Quarterback	Head football coach at North Dakota and Louisiana Tech
Rudy Rosatti	1922	1922	Guard	Later played professional football for the Cleveland Indians, Green Bay Packers, and New York Giants from 1923 to 1928.
Henry Schulte	1903	1905	Guard, center	Later coached football and track and field at Eastern Michigan University (1906–1908), University of Missouri (1914–1917), and University of Nebraska (1919–1938). Schulte was often referred to by the nickname "Indian" Schulte, though he was of German rather than Native American descent.
Germany Schulz	1904	1908	Center	Credited with having invented the spiral snap and with developing the practice of standing behind the defensive line. As the first lineman to play in back of the line on defense, he is credited as football's first linebacker. In 1951, Schulz was selected as the greatest center in football history in a poll conducted by the National Football Foundation and became one of the initial inductees into the College Football Hall of Fame.
S. Spencer Scott	1911	1913	Fullback, tackle	Became the president of Harcourt, Brace & Company
Walter W. Shaw	1899	1901	Quarterback, halfback	Later worked as an attorney, judge and businessman in Oklahoma and Louisiana.
Bruce Shorts	1900	1901	Tackle	Later served as the head football coach at the University of Nevada, Reno in 1904 and at the University of Oregon in 1905.
Edward Slaughter	1922	1924	Guard	All-American 1924; Later worked as an assistant coach at Wisconsin, North Carolina State and Virginia; Head coach of golf team at Virginia 1940–1958
Andrew W. Smith	1909	1909	Guard, center	Later served as head coach at Throop College of Technology (now known as California Institute of Technology) in Pasadena, California
Cedric C. Smith	1915	1917	Fullback	All-American 1917; later played professional football for the Massillon Tigers and Buffalo All-Americans.
Neil Snow	1898	1901	End	All-American in 1901; also played baseball, track and field, and tennis at Michigan; scored five touchdowns in the 1902 Rose Bowl; inducted into College Football Hall of Fame in 1960.
Benjamin H. Southworth	1900	1901	Guard, center	Later became a physician and surgeon in Kalamazoo
Cliff Sparks	1916	1919	Quarterback	All-American in 1916
Herb Steger	1922	1924	Halfback	Captain of the 1924 team; later served as an assistant football coach at Northwestern and as a Big Ten football official from 1931 to 1953.
Frank Steketee	1918	1921	Halfback, fullback	All-American in 1918; reportedly kicked a 100-yard punt for Michigan; also a member of Michigan's hockey, swimming and golf teams.
Norman Sterry	1900	1902	Halfback, end	Practiced for more than 50 years as a lawyer in Los Angeles; represented the New York Yankees in a landmark case before the U.S. Supreme Court affirming Major League Baseball's antitrust exemption
Theodore M. Stuart	1904	1905	End, halfback	Later served as head football coach at Colorado School of Mines (1910–1911).
Everett Sweeley	1899	1902	End, fullback	Later served as the head football coach at Morningside College (1903) and at Washington State (1904–1905); also coached basketball and baseball at Washington State; later became a lawyer and judge in Idaho.
Kip Taylor	1927	1927	End	Later served as the head coach at Oregon State (1949–1954).
George C. Thomson	1910	1912	Fullback	Leading scorer in 1911 and 1912; captain of the 1912 team; later served as President of Michigan Trust Company (1933–1956).
Roy Torbet	1911	1913	End, fullback, halfback	One of the earliest Michigan players to have success as a passer.
Joseph Truskowski	1926	1929	End	Captain of the 1929 Michigan football team; later served as head football coach at Olivet College and head baseball coach at Iowa State and Wayne State.
Eddie Usher	1918	1921	Fullback, halfback	Later played 3 years in the NFL for the Buffalo All-Americans, Rock Island Independents, Green Bay Packers and Kansas City Blues.
Irwin Uteritz	1921	1923	Quarterback	All-American in 1922; led Michigan to back-to-back undefeated seasons and 1923 national championship; later served as a football and baseball coach at Northwestern, Wisconsin, Cal, and Washington University in St. Louis.
Ernie Vick	1918	1921	Center	All-American in 1921; played Major League Baseball for the Cardinals (1922–1926); also played 3 years in the NFL with the Detroit Panthers, Chicago Bears and Detroit Lions; inducted into College Football Hall of Fame in 1983.
Billy Wasmund	1907	1909	Quarterback	Starting quarterback at Michigan from 1907 to 1909; later served as head football coach at Texas in 1910; died after walking from a second story window, possibly while sleep-waling, prior to start of 1911 season.
James K. Watkins	1905	1909	Tackle, center, fullback	Later became a leading attorney in Detroit and served as commissioner of the Detroit Police Department in the early 1930s; also organized the Detroit branch of "The Volunteers" in 1936 "to save their country from a perpetuation of the New Deal."
Wally Weber	1925	1927	Halfback, fullback	Later served as an assistant football coach at Michigan for 28 years from 1931 to 1958.
Boss Weeks	1900	1902	Quarterback	Quarterback of the 1901–1902 "Point-a-Minute" teams; later served as a head football coach at Kansas (1903) and Beloit (1904)
Stanfield Wells	1909	1911	End, halfback, tackle	All-American 1910; Michigan's first forward passer of note.
Archie Weston	1917	1919	Quarterback, halfback	All-American, 1917
Hugh White	1898	1901	Tackle, end	Captain of the 1901 "Point-a-Minute" team; later became president (1924–1927) and chairman (1927–1933) of the George A. Fuller Company, builder of the Lincoln Memorial and United States Supreme Court Building.
Tad Wieman	1915	1920	End, tackle, fullback	Later served as head football coach at Michigan (1927–1928) and Princeton (1938–1942); also the athletic director at Maine (1946–1951) and Denver (1951–1962); inducted into College Football Hall of Fame in 1956.
Ebin Wilson	1899	1901	Guard	Later served as head football coach at Wabash and Alma Colleges
Hugh E. Wilson	1918	1921	Guard	Later served as the head football and baseball coach at Louisiana Tech and head basketball coach at LSU.
