= Tingley, Iowa =

- City
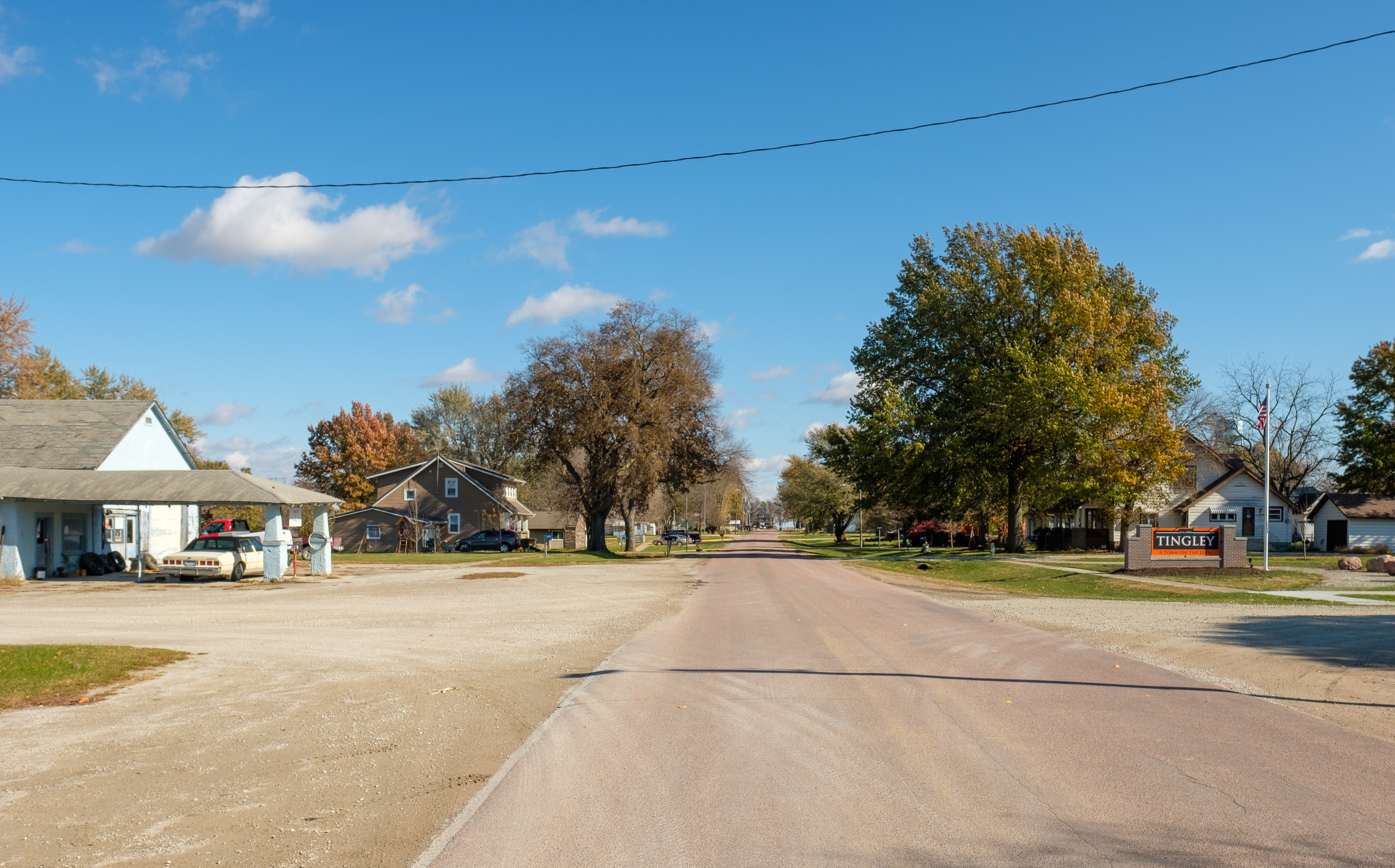
- Main Street

- Location of Tingley, Iowa
- Coordinates: 40°51′10″N 94°11′45″W
- Country: USA
- State: Iowa
- County: Ringgold

Area
  - Total: 0.69 sq mi (1.78 km^{2})
  - Land: 0.68 sq mi (1.77 km^{2})
  - Water: 0.0039 sq mi (0.01 km^{2})
- Elevation: 1,257 ft (383 m)

Population (2020)
  - Total: 136
  - Density: 199/sq mi (76.7/km^{2})
- Time zone: UTC-6 (Central (CST))
  - Summer (DST): UTC-5 (CDT)
- ZIP code: 50863
- Area code: 641
- FIPS code: 19-78195
- GNIS feature ID: 2397025
- Website: www.tingley.org

Tingley is a city in northern Ringgold County, Iowa, United States. The population was 136 at the time of the 2020 census.

== History ==
Tingley was founded in 1883.

== Geography ==
According to the United States Census Bureau, the city has a total area of 0.68 square miles (1.76 km^{2}), all land.

== Demographics ==
Historical populations
Year	Pop.	±%
1890	295	—
1900	488	+65.4%
1910	380	−22.1%
1920	391	+2.9%
1930	358	−8.4%
1940	390	+8.9%
1950	333	−14.6%
1960	278	−16.5%
1970	244	−12.2%
1980	210	−13.9%
1990	179	−14.8%
2000	171	−4.5%
2010	184	+7.6%
2020	136	−26.1%
Source:"U.S. Census website". United States Census Bureau. and Iowa Data Center; Source: U.S. Decennial Census

=== 2020 census ===
As of the census of 2020, there were 136 people, 63 households, and 43 families residing in the city. The population density was 198.6 inhabitants per square mile (76.7/km^{2}). There were 76 housing units at an average density of 111.0 per square mile (42.9/km^{2}). The racial makeup of the city was 97.1% White, 0.0% Black or African American, 0.0% Native American, 0.0% Asian, 0.0% Pacific Islander, 0.7% from other races and 2.2% from two or more races. Hispanic or Latino persons of any race comprised 2.9% of the population.

Of the 63 households, 22.2% of which had children under the age of 18 living with them, 47.6% were married couples living together, 7.9% were cohabitating couples, 27.0% had a female householder with no spouse or partner present and 17.5% had a male householder with no spouse or partner present. 31.7% of all households were non-families. 27.0% of all households were made up of individuals, 12.7% had someone living alone who was 65 years old or older.

The median age in the city was 45.8 years. 20.6% of the residents were under the age of 20; 2.2% were between the ages of 20 and 24; 25.0% were from 25 and 44; 24.3% were from 45 and 64; and 27.9% were 65 years of age or older. The gender makeup of the city was 46.3% male and 53.7% female.

=== 2010 census ===
As of the census of 2010, there were 184 people, 76 households, and 48 families living in the city. The population density was 270.6 inhabitants per square mile (104.5/km^{2}). There were 94 housing units at an average density of 138.2 per square mile (53.4/km^{2}). The racial makeup of the city was 100.0% White. Hispanic or Latino of any race were 0.5% of the population.

There were 76 households, of which 27.6% had children under the age of 18 living with them, 52.6% were married couples living together, 7.9% had a female householder with no husband present, 2.6% had a male householder with no wife present, and 36.8% were non-families. 27.6% of all households were made up of individuals, and 19.7% had someone living alone who was 65 years of age or older. The average household size was 2.42 and the average family size was 2.98.

The median age in the city was 45 years. 27.2% of residents were under the age of 18; 4.8% were between the ages of 18 and 24; 17.9% were from 25 to 44; 18.5% were from 45 to 64; and 31.5% were 65 years of age or older. The gender makeup of the city was 47.3% male and 52.7% female.

=== 2000 census ===
As of the census of 2000, there were 171 people, 87 households, and 44 families living in the city. The population density was 253.6 inhabitants per square mile (97.9/km^{2}). There were 109 housing units at an average density of 161.6 per square mile (62.4/km^{2}). The racial makeup of the city was 98.25% White, and 1.75% from two or more races. Hispanic or Latino of any race were 0.58% of the population.

There were 87 households, out of which 19.5% had children under the age of 18 living with them, 42.5% were married couples living together, 6.9% had a female householder with no husband present, and 48.3% were non-families. 46.0% of all households were made up of individuals, and 33.3% had someone living alone who was 65 years of age or older. The average household size was 1.97 and the average family size was 2.78.

In the city, the population was spread out, with 19.9% under the age of 18, 6.4% from 18 to 24, 20.5% from 25 to 44, 27.5% from 45 to 64, and 25.7% who were 65 years of age or older. The median age was 49 years. For every 100 females, there were 81.9 males. For every 100 females age 18 and over, there were 69.1 males.

The median income for a household in the city was $22,321, and the median income for a family was $34,375. Males had a median income of $26,250 versus $22,222 for females. The per capita income for the city was $14,475. About 7.7% of families and 10.1% of the population were below the poverty line, including 2.7% of those under the age of eighteen and 19.0% of those 65 or over.

== Education ==
Mount Ayr Community School District operates public schools serving the community.
