= 1923 Big Ten Conference football season =

- Sport: Football
- Teams: 10
- Co-champions: Illinois, Michigan

Football seasons
- 1922 1924

1923 Big Ten Conference football standings
	Conf.					Overall
Team	W		L		T	W		L		T
Illinois +	5	–	0	–	0	8	–	0	–	0
Michigan +	4	–	0	–	0	8	–	0	–	0
Chicago	5	–	1	–	0	7	–	1	–	0
Minnesota	2	–	1	–	1	5	–	1	–	1
Iowa	3	–	3	–	0	5	–	3	–	0
Indiana	2	–	2	–	0	3	–	4	–	0
Wisconsin	1	–	3	–	1	3	–	3	–	1
Ohio State	1	–	4	–	0	3	–	4	–	1
Purdue	1	–	4	–	0	2	–	5	–	1
Northwestern	0	–	6	–	0	2	–	6	–	0
+ – Conference co-champions

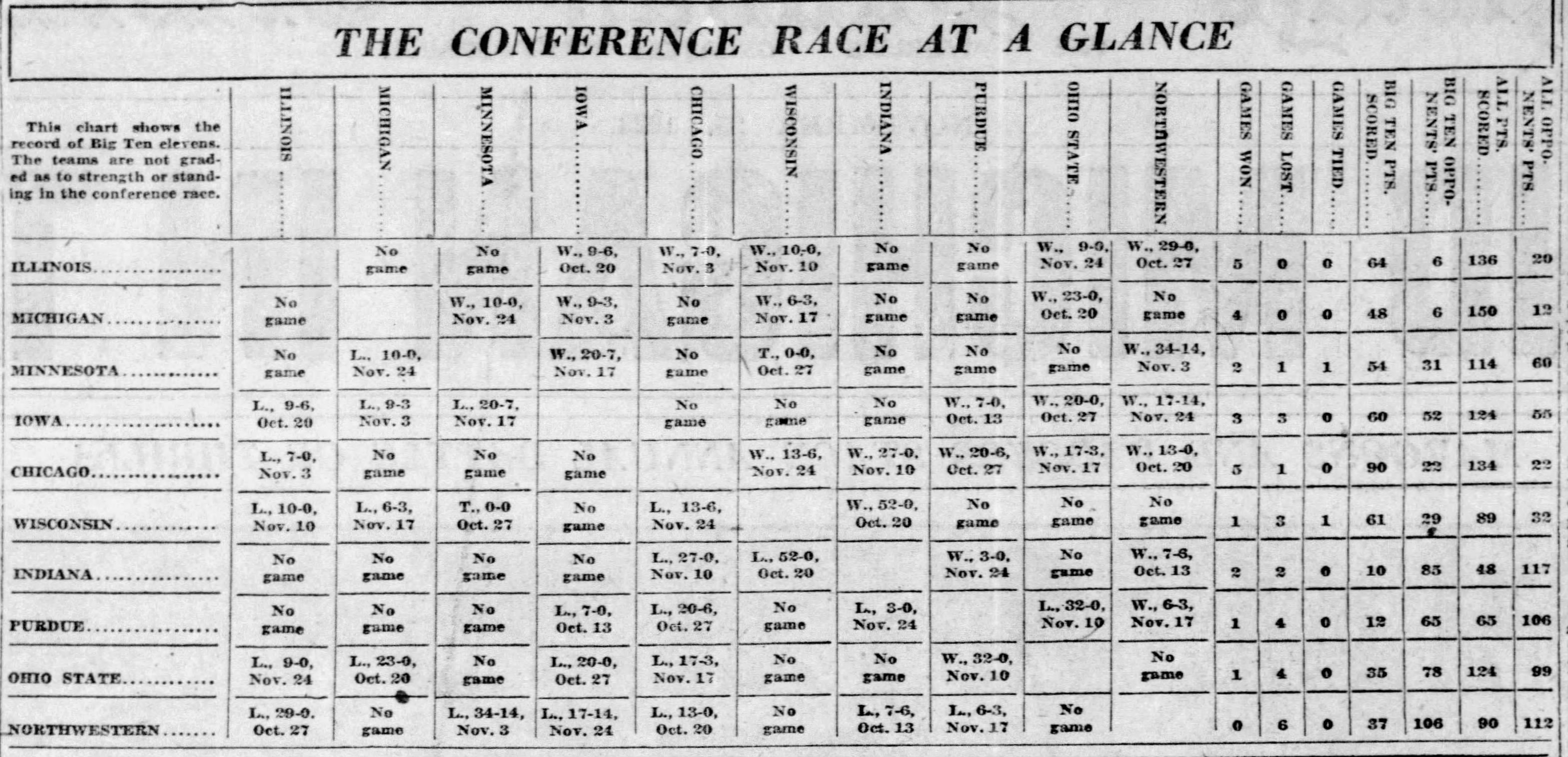
Results for football in the Big Ten Conference in 1923

The 1923 Big Ten Conference football season was the 28th season of college football played by the member schools of the Big Ten Conference (also known as the Western Conference) and was a part of the 1923 college football season.

Illinois, under head coach Robert Zuppke, compiled an 8–0 record, outscored opponents by a combined total of 136 to 20, and tied for the Big Ten championship. Halfback Red Grange was recognized as a consensus All-American and was one of the inaugural inductees into the College Football Hall of Fame. The 1923 Illinois team has been recognized as the national champion by selected retroactively as the national champion by the Boand System, College Football Researchers Association, Helms Athletic Foundation, and Parke H. Davis, and as a co-national champion by the Berryman QPRS system, National Championship Foundation, and Jeff Sagarin (using the ELO-Chess methodology).

Michigan, under head coach Fielding H. Yost, compiled an 8–0 record, tied for the Big Ten championship, and outscored its opponents by a combined total of 150 to 12. Michigan led the conference in both scoring offense (18.8 points per game) and scoring defense (1.5 points per game). Center Jack Blott was a consensus All-American, and halfback Harry Kipke was later inducted into the College Football Hall of Fame. The season was part of a 20-game undefeated streak for Michigan that began on October 29, 1921, and continued until October 18, 1924. During the combined 1922 and 1923 seasons, Michigan compiled a 14–0–1 record. The 1923 Michigan team has been recognized as the national champion by the Billingsley Report and as a co-national champion by the National Championship Foundation.

== Season overview ==
=== Results and team statistics ===
Conf. Rank	Team	Head coach	Overall record	Conf. record	PPG	PAG
1 (tie)	Illinois	Robert Zuppke	8–0	5–0	17.0	2.5
1 (tie)	Michigan	Fielding H. Yost	8–0	4–0	18.8	1.5
3	Chicago	Amos A. Stagg	7–1	5–1	16.8	2.8
4	Minnesota	William H. Spaulding	5-1-1	3-1-1	16.3	8.6
5	Iowa	Howard Jones	5–3	3–3	15.5	6.9
6	Indiana	Bill Ingram	3–4	2–2	6.9	16.7
7	Wisconsin	John J. Ryan	3–3–1	1–3–1	12.7	4.6
8	Ohio State	John Wilce	3–4–1	1–4	15.5	12.4
9	Purdue	James Phelan	2–5–1	1–4	8.1	13.3
10	Northwestern	Glenn Thistlethwaite	2–6	0–6	14.6	7.0

Key

PPG = Average of points scored per game
PAG = Average of points allowed per game

=== Bowl games ===
No Big Ten teams participated in any bowl games during the 1923 season.

== All-Big Ten players ==
Ten players received first-team honors on the 1923 All-Big Ten Conference football team from at least two of the following selectors: Billy Evans (BE) Norman E. Brown (NB), and Walter Eckersall (WE).

- Ray Eklund, end, Minnesota (BE, NB, WE)
- Marty Below, tackle, Wisconsin (BE, NB, WE)
- Stanley Muirhead, tackle, Michigan (BE, NB, WE)
- Jim McMillen, guard, Illinois (BE, NB, WE)
- Jack Blott, center, Michigan (BE, NB, WE)
- Hoge Workman, quarterback, Ohio State (NB, WE)
- Red Grange, halfback, Illinois (BE, NB, WE)
- Earl Martineau, halfback, Minnesota (BE, NB)
- Harry Kipke, halfback, Michigan (BE, WE)
- Merrill Taft, fullback, Wisconsin (BE, NB, WE)

== All-Americans ==
Five Big Ten players were recognized as consensus first-team players on the 1923 College Football All-America Team:

- Red Grange, halfback, Illinois (Athletic World magazine [AW], Walter Camp [WC], Football World magazine [FW], Lawrence Perry [LP], Norman E. Brown [NB], Davis J. Walsh [DW], Tom Thorp [TT], Percy Haughton [PH],)
- Ray Eklund, end, Minnesota (AW, FW, LP, NB, TT, PH)
- Marty Below, tackle, Wisconsin (AW, FW, NB, DW)
- Jim McMillen, guard, Illinois (AW, FW, NB, DW, TT)
- Jack Blott, center, Michigan (AW, WC, FW, NB, DW)
