= 1923 Minnesota Golden Gophers football team =

American college football season

1923 Minnesota Golden Gophers football
- Conference: Big Ten Conference
- Record: 5–1–1 (3–1–1 Big Ten)
- Head coach: William H. Spaulding (2nd season)
- Captain: Earl Martineau
- Home stadium: Northrop Field

1923 Big Ten Conference football standings
	Conf.					Overall
Team	W		L		T	W		L		T
Illinois +	5	–	0	–	0	8	–	0	–	0
Michigan +	4	–	0	–	0	8	–	0	–	0
Chicago	5	–	1	–	0	7	–	1	–	0
Minnesota	2	–	1	–	1	5	–	1	–	1
Iowa	3	–	3	–	0	5	–	3	–	0
Indiana	2	–	2	–	0	3	–	4	–	0
Wisconsin	1	–	3	–	1	3	–	3	–	1
Ohio State	1	–	4	–	0	3	–	4	–	1
Purdue	1	–	4	–	0	2	–	5	–	1
Northwestern	0	–	6	–	0	2	–	6	–	0
+ – Conference co-champions

The 1923 Minnesota Golden Gophers football team represented the University of Minnesota in the 1923 Big Ten Conference football season. In their second year under head coach William H. Spaulding, the Golden Gophers compiled a 5–1–1 record and outscored their opponents by a combined score of 114 to 60. It was Minnesota's final season playing on Northrop Field.

End Ray Eklund was a consensus first-team All-American, and halfback Earl Martineau also received first-team All-American honors from Walter Camp.

Three Minnesota players were selected as first-team players on the 1923 All-Big Ten Conference football team. Eklund and Martineau both received first-team honors from the Big Ten coaches and from Norman E. Brown. Guard George Abramson received first-team honors from Brown.

== Schedule ==
Date	Opponent	Site	Result	Attendance	Source
October 6	Iowa State*	Northrop Field; Minneapolis, MN	W 20–17	12,000	
October 13	Haskell*	Northrop Field; Minneapolis, MN	W 13–12	15,000	
October 20	North Dakota*	Northrop Field; Minneapolis, MN	W 27–0	14,000	
October 27	at Wisconsin	Camp Randall Stadium; Madison, WI (rivalry)	T 0–0	40,000	
November 3	Northwestern	Northrop Field; Minneapolis, MN	W 34–14	18,000	
November 17	Iowa^{†}	Northrop Field; Minneapolis, MN (rivalry)	W 20–7	26,000	
November 24	at Michigan	Ferry Field; Ann Arbor, MI (Little Brown Jug)	L 0–10	42,000–45,000	
*Non-conference game; ^{†}Homecoming

== Game summaries ==
=== Michigan ===
Week 8: Minnesota at Michigan

Team	1	2	3	4	Total
Minnesota	0	0	0	0	0
• Michigan	0	7	3	0	10

- Date: November 24, 1923
- Location: Ferry Field
  Ann Arbor, MI
- Game attendance: 42,000
- Referee: James Masker (Northwestern)

Minnesota concluded its season on November 24, 1923, with a 10–0 loss to Michigan. The game was played at Ferry Field in Ann Arbor, Michigan, in front of a crowd of close to 42,000 spectators. The game was the final college football appearance for two All-American halfbacks, Harry Kipke of Michigan, and Earl Martineau of Minnesota. Both teams came into the game unbeaten.

Six of Michigan's 11 starters were injured and unavailable to play in the game. Accordingly, Michigan played five starters and six substitutes against the Golden Gophers. Minnesota also suffered a setback when its starting quarterback, Graham, was injured in the first quarter.

Michigan scored the only touchdown of the game in the second quarter on a 51-yard drive that featured a ten-yard run by Harry Kipke and a 12-yard gain on a pass to Steger. With the ball at the Minnesota 31-yard line, fullback Richard Vick passed to quarterback Tod Rockwell. Rockwell caught the pass at the 20-yard line and ran for the touchdown. Rockwell also kicked the extra point to give Michigan a 7–0 lead. In the third quarter, Edliff Slaughter blocked a punt by Martineau, and Dick Babcock recovered the ball at Minnesota's 27-yard line. When Michigan was unable to score, Kipke drop-kicked for a field goal from the 37-yard line. Minnesota's final drive was stopped on an interception by Kipke.

On defense, Michigan shut out a Minnesota offense that had scored 34 points against Northwestern and 20 against Iowa. The Golden Gophers threw eight passes for zero completions and two interceptions. Left tackle Stanley Muirhead, playing his final game for Michigan, was credited with the success of the defense:

In his last game against Minnesota, November 24, Muirhead was everywhere. He made three-fourths of the tackles under punts, and was always on the ball. A check was made during the game of Muirheads's tackles. No less than twenty-two times did this stalwart tackle bring down his man. He was a veritable demon on the field. He could not be stopped. If there is a greater tackle in the country than Stan Muirhead of Michigan he has not yet been seen.

Princeton coach Bill Roper watched the Michigan-Minnesota game as a guest of Fielding Yost. After the game, Roper had high praise for Kipke: "Kipke is the greatest punter I have ever seen ... I have never seen such deadly accuracy ... It was impossible for the Minnesota quarterback to handle Kipke's kicks. Most of them went out of bounds some fifty yards from the line of scrimmage."
