= 1923 Purdue Boilermakers football team =

American college football season

1923 Purdue Boilermakers football
- Conference: Big Ten Conference
- Record: 2–5–1 (1–4 Big Ten)
- Head coach: James Phelan (2nd season)
- Captain: Ralph Claypool
- Home stadium: Stuart Field

1923 Big Ten Conference football standings
	Conf.					Overall
Team	W		L		T	W		L		T
Illinois +	5	–	0	–	0	8	–	0	–	0
Michigan +	4	–	0	–	0	8	–	0	–	0
Chicago	5	–	1	–	0	7	–	1	–	0
Minnesota	2	–	1	–	1	5	–	1	–	1
Iowa	3	–	3	–	0	5	–	3	–	0
Indiana	2	–	2	–	0	3	–	4	–	0
Wisconsin	1	–	3	–	1	3	–	3	–	1
Ohio State	1	–	4	–	0	3	–	4	–	1
Purdue	1	–	4	–	0	2	–	5	–	1
Northwestern	0	–	6	–	0	2	–	6	–	0
+ – Conference co-champions

The 1923 Purdue Boilermakers football team was an American football team that represented Purdue University during the 1923 Big Ten Conference football season. In their second season under head coach James Phelan, the Boilermakers compiled a 2–5–1 record, finished in a tie for seventh place in the Big Ten Conference with a 1–4 record against conference opponents, and were outscored by their opponents by a total of 106 to 65. Ralph Claypool was the team captain.

== Schedule ==
Date	Opponent	Site	Result	Attendance	Source
October 6	Wilmington (OH)*	Stuart Field; West Lafayette, IN	W 39–0		
October 13	at Iowa	Iowa Field; Iowa City, IA	L 0–7		
October 20	Wabash*	Stuart Field; West Lafayette, IN	T 7–7		
October 27	at Chicago	Stagg Field; Chicago, IL (rivalry)	L 6–20		
November 3	at Notre Dame*	Cartier Field; Notre Dame, IN (rivalry)	L 7–34	20,000	
November 10	Ohio State	Stuart Field; West Lafayette, IN	L 0–32		
November 17	Northwestern^{†}	Stuart Field; West Lafayette, IN	W 6–3		
November 24	at Indiana	Jordan Field; Bloomington, IN (Old Oaken Bucket)	L 0–3		
*Non-conference game; ^{†}Homecoming

== Roster ==
- Phillip Anderson, G
- Rudolph Bahr, HB
- J. T. Bolan, T
- J. J. Bosonitz, G
- W. M. Carlson, FB
- Ralph Claypool, C
- E. R. Dye, E
- M. L. Gladders, HB
- Harold Harmeson, RH
- Donald Holmes, QB
- Harry Jacobs, QB
- Ed Meyer, T
- Charles Murphy, G
- C. Horace Pillman, E
- Joey Prout, HB
- E. Ravenscraft, E
- Harry Rosborg, T
- George Spradling, LH
- L. L. Stewart, T
- Mel Taube, QB
- Ferd. Wellman, FB
- B. V. Worth, RH
