= 1923 Northwestern Purple football team =

American college football season

1923 Northwestern Purple football
- Conference: Big Ten Conference
- Record: 2–6 (0–6 Big Ten)
- Head coach: Glenn Thistlethwaite (2nd season)
- Captain: William McElwain
- Home stadium: Northwestern Field

1923 Big Ten Conference football standings
| | Conf. | | | | | Overall |
| Team | W | | L | | T | W | | L | | T |
|---|---|---|---|---|---|---|---|---|---|---|
| Illinois + | 5 | – | 0 | – | 0 | 8 | – | 0 | – | 0 |
| Michigan + | 4 | – | 0 | – | 0 | 8 | – | 0 | – | 0 |
| Chicago | 5 | – | 1 | – | 0 | 7 | – | 1 | – | 0 |
| Minnesota | 2 | – | 1 | – | 1 | 5 | – | 1 | – | 1 |
| Iowa | 3 | – | 3 | – | 0 | 5 | – | 3 | – | 0 |
| Indiana | 2 | – | 2 | – | 0 | 3 | – | 4 | – | 0 |
| Wisconsin | 1 | – | 3 | – | 1 | 3 | – | 3 | – | 1 |
| Ohio State | 1 | – | 4 | – | 0 | 3 | – | 4 | – | 1 |
| Purdue | 1 | – | 4 | – | 0 | 2 | – | 5 | – | 1 |
| Northwestern | 0 | – | 6 | – | 0 | 2 | – | 6 | – | 0 |
+ – Conference co-champions

The 1923 Northwestern Purple football team represented Northwestern University during the 1923 Big Ten Conference football season. In their second year under head coach Glenn Thistlethwaite, the Purple compiled a 2–6 record (0–6 against Big Ten Conference opponents) and finished in last place in the Big Ten Conference.

== Schedule ==
| Date | Opponent | Site | Result | Attendance | Source |
|---|---|---|---|---|---|
| October 6 | Beloit* | Northwestern Field; Evanston, IL | W 21–6 | | |
| October 13 | vs. Indiana | Washington Park; Indianapolis, IN | L 6–7 | | |
| October 20 | at Chicago | Stagg Field; Chicago, IL | L 0–13 | | |
| October 27 | vs. Illinois | Cubs Park; Chicago, IL (rivalry) | L 0–29 | 32,000 | |
| November 3 | at Minnesota | Northrop Field; Minneapolis, MN | L 14–34 | 18,000 | |
| November 10 | Lake Forest* | Northwestern Field; Evanston, IL | W 32–0 | | |
| November 17 | at Purdue | Stuart Field; West Lafayette, IN | L 3–6 | | |
| November 24 | Iowa | Northwestern Field; Evanston, IL | L 14–17 | | |
*Non-conference game
