= 1923 Illinois Fighting Illini football team =

American college football season

1923 Illinois Fighting Illini football

National champion (Boand, CFRA, Helms, Davis) Co-national champion (QPRS, NCF, Sagarin-ELO) Big Ten co-champion
- Conference: Big Ten Conference
- Record: 8–0 (5–0 Big Ten)
- Head coach: Robert Zuppke (11th season)
- Offensive scheme: Single-wing
- Captain: Jim McMillen
- Home stadium: Illinois Field; Memorial Stadium

Uniform
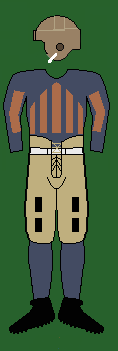

1923 Big Ten Conference football standings
	Conf.					Overall
Team	W		L		T	W		L		T
Illinois +	5	–	0	–	0	8	–	0	–	0
Michigan +	4	–	0	–	0	8	–	0	–	0
Chicago	5	–	1	–	0	7	–	1	–	0
Minnesota	2	–	1	–	1	5	–	1	–	1
Iowa	3	–	3	–	0	5	–	3	–	0
Indiana	2	–	2	–	0	3	–	4	–	0
Wisconsin	1	–	3	–	1	3	–	3	–	1
Ohio State	1	–	4	–	0	3	–	4	–	1
Purdue	1	–	4	–	0	2	–	5	–	1
Northwestern	0	–	6	–	0	2	–	6	–	0
+ – Conference co-champions

The 1923 Illinois Fighting Illini football team was an American football squad representing the University of Illinois in the 1923 Big Ten Conference football season. In their 11th season under head coach Robert Zuppke, the Fighting Illini compiled an 8–0 record (5–0 against Big Ten Conference opponents), tied with Michigan for the Big Ten championship, shut out five of eight opponents, and outscored their opponents by a total of 136 to 20.

There was no contemporaneous system in 1923 for determining a national champion. However, Illinois was retroactively named as the national champion by the Boand System, College Football Researchers Association, Helms Athletic Foundation, and Parke H. Davis, and as a co-national champion by the Berryman QPRS system, National Championship Foundation, and Jeff Sagarin (using the ELO-Chess methodology).

Sophomore left halfback Red Grange put up 196 yards on 21 carries in the season opener, launching his legendary collegiate career with a flourish. For the year Grange "The Galloping Ghost" tallied 723 rushing yards and scored 12 touchdowns in seven games. In 2008, Grange was named by ESPN as the best college football player of all time. He was also a charter member of the College and Pro Football Halls of Fame.

Grange and Guard Jim McMillen were consensus first-team picks on the 1923 All-America college football team. McMillen was also the team captain.

This was the first season for the Fighting Illini at Memorial Stadium, where the team plays their home games to this day.

== Schedule ==
Date	Opponent	Site	Result	Attendance	Source
October 6	Nebraska*	Illinois Field; Champaign, IL	W 24–7		
October 13	Butler*	Illinois Field; Champaign, IL	W 21–7		
October 20	at Iowa	Iowa Field; Iowa City, IA	W 9–6	25,000	
October 27	vs. Northwestern	Cubs Park; Chicago, IL (rivalry)	W 29–0	32,000	
November 3	Chicago	Memorial Stadium; Champaign, IL	W 7–0	61,000	
November 10	Wisconsin	Memorial Stadium; Champaign, IL	W 10–0	30,000	
November 17	Mississippi A&M*	Memorial Stadium; Champaign, IL	W 27–0	25,000	
November 24	at Ohio State	Ohio Stadium; Columbus, Ohio (rivalry)	W 9–0	42,000	
*Non-conference game

== Roster ==
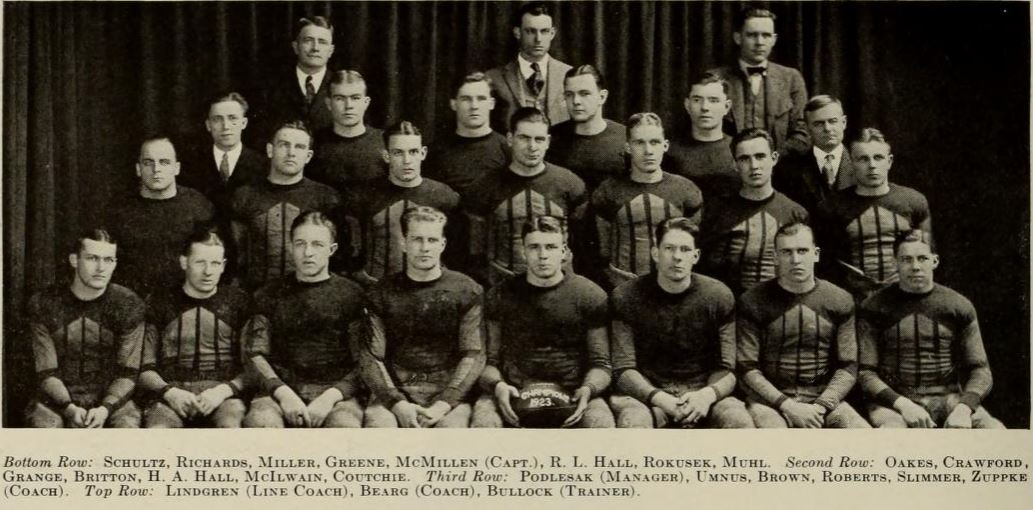
The 1923 Illinois squad, official team picture.

Player	Position	Class	Hometown
Steve Coutchie	Quarterback	Senior	Harvey, Illinois
Harry 'Swede' Hall	Quarterback	Senior	Chicago, Illinois
Red Grange	Halfback	Senior	Wheaton, Illinois
Wally McIlwain	Wingback/Halfback	Sophomore	Evanston, Illinois
Earl Britton	Fullback/Placekicker/Punter	Sophomore	Elgin, Illinois
Bill Hansen	Fullback	Junior	Brookston, Indiana
Heinie Schultz	End	Junior	Geneseo, Illinois
Ted Richards	End	Junior	Glencoe, Illinois
Frank Edward Rokusek	End	Senior	Omaha, Nebraska
Clarence Arthur Muhl	End	Senior	Oskaloosa, Iowa
Gilbert Jay Roberts	Center	Senior	Oskaloosa, Iowa
Vee Green	Center	Senior	Waukegan, Illinois
Roy Andrew Miller	Tackle	Sophomore	Urbana, Illinois
Chuck Addison Brown	Tackle	Sophomore	Cissna Park, Illinois
Richard 'Dick' Hall	Tackle	Senior	Logansport, Indiana
John Mauer	Tackle	Sophomore	Batavia, Illinois
Bunny Oakes	Tackle	Senior	Maywood, Illinois
Mush Crawford	Tackle	Sophomore	Waukegan, Illinois
Jim McMillen	Right Guard	Senior	Grayslake, Illinois
Louis Frederick Slimmer	Guard	Senior	Millville, New Jersey
Leonard J. Umnus	Guard	Junior	Menominee, Michigan

- Head coach: Robert Zuppke (11th year at Illinois)

== Awards and honors ==
The following Illinois players received honors on the 1923 All-America college football team and/or the 1923 All-Big Ten Conference football team:

- Halfback Red Grange

- Consensus first-team All-American
- First-team All-Big Ten selection by Norman E. Brown and Walter Eckersall

- Guard Jim McMillen

- Consensus first-team All-American
- First-team All-Big Ten selection by Brown and Eckersall

- End Frank Rokusek

- Second-team All-American selected by Lawrence Perry
- Second-team All-Big Ten selection by Brown and Eckersall

- Quarterback Harry A. Hall

- Second-team All-Big Ten selection by Eckersall

- Fullback Earl Britton

- Second-team All-Big Ten selection by Brown and third-team selection by Eckersall
