= 1923 Iowa Hawkeyes football team =

American college football season

1923 Iowa Hawkeyes football
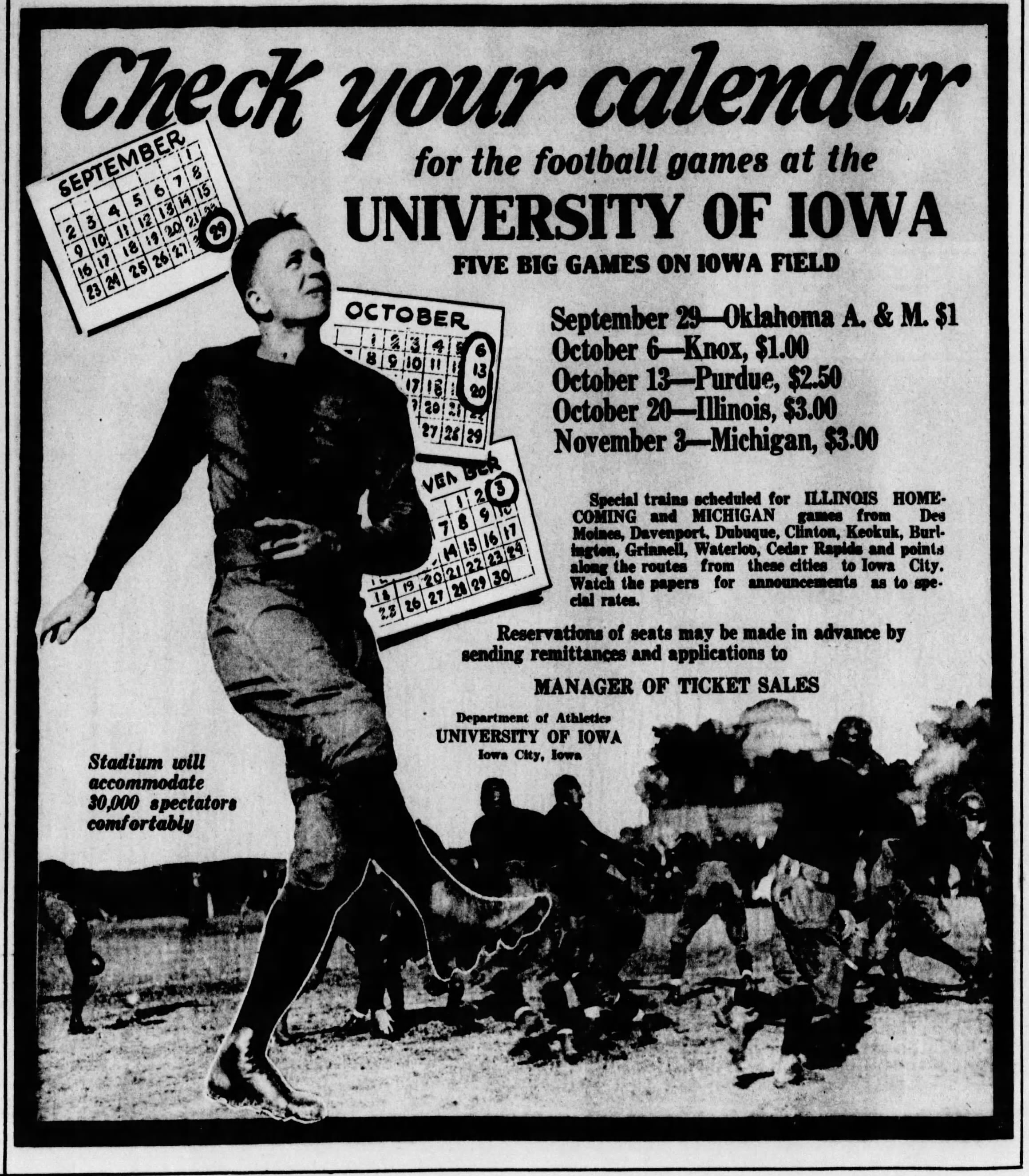
- 1923 advertisement for Iowa football
- Conference: Big Ten Conference
- Record: 5–3 (3–3 Big Ten)
- Head coach: Howard Jones (8th season)
- Offensive scheme: Single-wing
- Captain: Glenn Miller
- Home stadium: Iowa Field

1923 Big Ten Conference football standings
	Conf.					Overall
Team	W		L		T	W		L		T
Illinois +	5	–	0	–	0	8	–	0	–	0
Michigan +	4	–	0	–	0	8	–	0	–	0
Chicago	5	–	1	–	0	7	–	1	–	0
Minnesota	2	–	1	–	1	5	–	1	–	1
Iowa	3	–	3	–	0	5	–	3	–	0
Indiana	2	–	2	–	0	3	–	4	–	0
Wisconsin	1	–	3	–	1	3	–	3	–	1
Ohio State	1	–	4	–	0	3	–	4	–	1
Purdue	1	–	4	–	0	2	–	5	–	1
Northwestern	0	–	6	–	0	2	–	6	–	0
+ – Conference co-champions

The 1923 Iowa Hawkeyes football team was an American football team that represented the University of Iowa as a member of the Big Ten Conference during the 1923 Big Ten football season. In their eighth and final year under head coach Howard Jones, the Hawkeyes compiled a 5–3 record (3–3 in conference games), finished fifth in the Big Ten, and outscored opponents by a total of 106 to 50. The season was part of a 20-game winning streak that began on November 6, 1920, and continued until October 20, 1923.

== Schedule ==
Date	Opponent	Site	Result	Attendance	Source
September 29	Oklahoma A&M*	Iowa Field; Iowa City, IA	W 20–0		
October 6	Knox (IL)*	Iowa Field; Iowa City, IA	W 44–3		
October 13	at Purdue	Iowa Field; Iowa City, IA	W 7–0		
October 20	Illinois^{†}	Iowa Field; Iowa City, IA	L 6–9	25,000	
October 27	at Ohio State	Ohio Stadium; Columbus, OH	W 20–0		
November 3	Michigan	Iowa Field; Iowa City, IA	L 3–9	17,000	
November 17	at Minnesota	Northrop Field; Minneapolis, MN (rivalry)	L 7–20	26,000	
November 24	at Northwestern	Northwestern Field; Evanston, IL	W 17–14		
*Non-conference game; ^{†}Homecoming
