= 1923 Ohio State Buckeyes football team =

American college football season

1923 Ohio State Buckeyes football
- Conference: Big Ten Conference
- Record: 3–4–1 (1–4 Big Ten)
- Head coach: John Wilce (11th season)
- Captain: Boni Petcoff
- Home stadium: Ohio Stadium

1923 Big Ten Conference football standings
| | Conf. | | | | | Overall |
| Team | W | | L | | T | W | | L | | T |
|---|---|---|---|---|---|---|---|---|---|---|
| Illinois + | 5 | – | 0 | – | 0 | 8 | – | 0 | – | 0 |
| Michigan + | 4 | – | 0 | – | 0 | 8 | – | 0 | – | 0 |
| Chicago | 5 | – | 1 | – | 0 | 7 | – | 1 | – | 0 |
| Minnesota | 2 | – | 1 | – | 1 | 5 | – | 1 | – | 1 |
| Iowa | 3 | – | 3 | – | 0 | 5 | – | 3 | – | 0 |
| Indiana | 2 | – | 2 | – | 0 | 3 | – | 4 | – | 0 |
| Wisconsin | 1 | – | 3 | – | 1 | 3 | – | 3 | – | 1 |
| Ohio State | 1 | – | 4 | – | 0 | 3 | – | 4 | – | 1 |
| Purdue | 1 | – | 4 | – | 0 | 2 | – | 5 | – | 1 |
| Northwestern | 0 | – | 6 | – | 0 | 2 | – | 6 | – | 0 |
+ – Conference co-champions

The 1923 Ohio State Buckeyes football team represented Ohio State University in the 1923 Big Ten Conference football season. The Buckeyes compiled a 3–4–1 record, but outscored opponents 124–99.

== Schedule ==
| Date | Opponent | Site | Result | Attendance | Source |
|---|---|---|---|---|---|
| October 6 | Ohio Wesleyan* | Ohio Stadium; Columbus, OH | W 24–7 | | |
| October 13 | Colgate* | Ohio Stadium; Columbus, OH | T 23–23 | | |
| October 20 | at Michigan | Ferry Field; Ann Arbor, MI (rivalry) | L 0–23 | 50,000 | |
| October 27 | Iowa | Ohio Stadium; Columbus, OH | L 0–20 | | |
| November 3 | Denison* | Ohio Stadium; Columbus, OH | W 42–0 | | |
| November 10 | at Purdue | Stuart Field; West Lafayette, IN | W 32–0 | | |
| November 17 | at Chicago | Stagg Field; Chicago, IL | L 3–17 | | |
| November 24 | Illinois | Ohio Stadium; Columbus, OH (rivalry) | L 0–9 | 42,000 | |
*Non-conference game

== Coaching staff ==
- John Wilce, head coach, 11th year
