= 1923 Chicago Maroons football team =

American college football season

1923 Chicago Maroons football
- Conference: Big Ten Conference
- Record: 7–1 (5–1 Big Ten)
- Head coach: Amos Alonzo Stagg (32nd season)
- Captain: Jimmy Pyott
- Home stadium: Stagg Field

Uniform
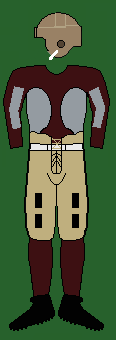

1923 Big Ten Conference football standings
	Conf.					Overall
Team	W		L		T	W		L		T
Illinois +	5	–	0	–	0	8	–	0	–	0
Michigan +	4	–	0	–	0	8	–	0	–	0
Chicago	5	–	1	–	0	7	–	1	–	0
Minnesota	2	–	1	–	1	5	–	1	–	1
Iowa	3	–	3	–	0	5	–	3	–	0
Indiana	2	–	2	–	0	3	–	4	–	0
Wisconsin	1	–	3	–	1	3	–	3	–	1
Ohio State	1	–	4	–	0	3	–	4	–	1
Purdue	1	–	4	–	0	2	–	5	–	1
Northwestern	0	–	6	–	0	2	–	6	–	0
+ – Conference co-champions

The 1923 Chicago Maroons football team was an American football team that represented the University of Chicago during the 1923 Big Ten Conference football season. In their 32nd season under head coach Amos Alonzo Stagg, the Maroons compiled a 7–1 record, finished in third place in the Big Ten Conference, and outscored their opponents by a combined total of 134 to 22. Jimmy Pyott was the Maroons captain.

Notable players on the 1924 Chicago team included guard Joe Pondelik, end Elmer A. Lampe, fullback John Webster Thomas, and tackle Frank Gowdy. Fritz Crisler was an assistant coach on the team.

== Schedule ==
Date	Opponent	Site	Result	Attendance	Source
September 29	Michigan Agricultural*	Stagg Field; Chicago, IL	W 34–0		
October 6	Colorado Agricultural*	Stagg Field; Chicago, IL	W 10–0		
October 20	Northwestern	Stagg Field; Chicago, IL	W 13–0		
October 27	Purdue	Stagg Field; Chicago, IL (rivalry)	W 20–6		
November 3	at Illinois	Memorial Stadium; Champaign, IL	L 0–7	61,000	
November 10	Indiana	Stagg Field; Chicago, IL	W 27–0		
November 17	Ohio State	Stagg Field; Chicago, IL	W 17–3		
November 24	Wisconsin	Stagg Field; Chicago, IL	W 13–6		
*Non-conference game
