= Dick Hall (American football) =

American football player (1903–1971)

No. 26, 31
- Position: Tackle

Personal information
- Born: June 3, 1903; Logansport, Indiana, U.S.
- Died: September 7, 1971 (aged 68); Homewood, Illinois, U.S.
- Listed height: 6 ft 2 in (1.88 m)
- Listed weight: 220 lb (100 kg)

Career information
- High school: Logansport
- College: Butler (1921); Illinois (1923–1924)

Career history
- New York Yankees (1926–1927)

Awards and highlights
- National champion (1923)

Career statistics
- Games played: 15
- Games started: 13
- Stats at Pro Football Reference

Richard Lewis Hall (June 6, 1903 – September 7, 1971) was an American professional football tackle for the New York Yankees of the American Football League (AFL) and National Football League (NFL). He played college football for the Butler Bulldogs and Illinois Fighting Illini.

== Early life ==
Hall was born on June 6, 1903, in Logansport, Indiana and attended Logansport High School.

== College career ==
Hall played college football for the Butler Bulldogs in 1921 and Illinois Fighting Illini from 1923 to 1924. He played one season of football at tackle and also played basketball at guard. Hall then left Butler went home to Logansport. He then enrolled at the University of Illinois and played two seasons at right tackle.

== Professional career ==
On July 14, 1926, it was announced that Hall signed a contract to play for the New York Yankees of the American Football League (AFL). He spent the offseason working as a laborer on a new gym at Logansport High School. Hall played in 15 games and started in 14 at tackle. He remained with the team as they joined the National Football League (NFL) where he played in 15 games and started in 13. On August 1, 1928, he became a free agent.

== Personal life ==
Hall later worked at Inland Steel, where he was promoted from laborer to superintendent. He died on September 7, 1971, in Homewood, Illinois.
