= 1923 Michigan Wolverines football team =

American college football season

1923 Michigan Wolverines football
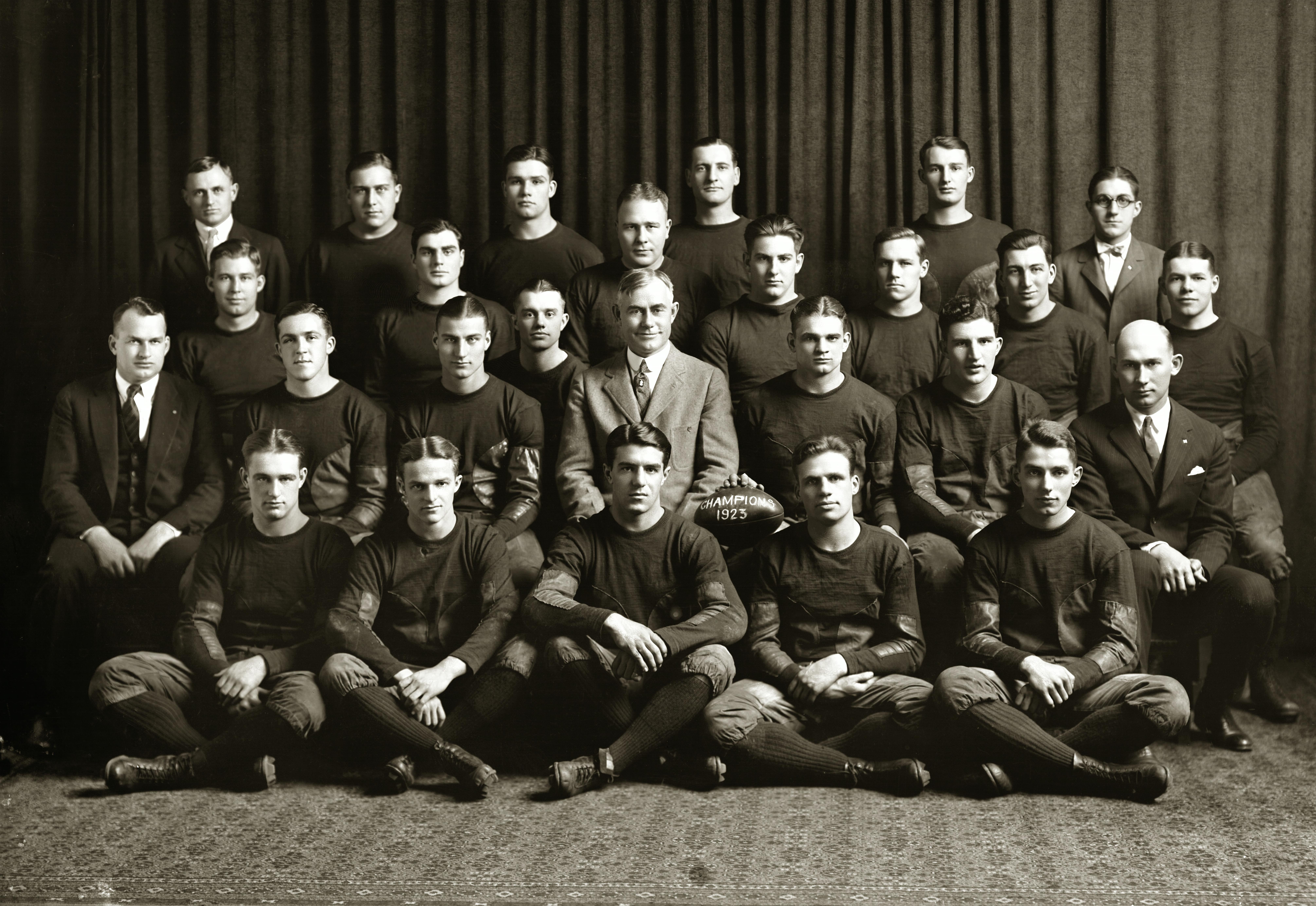

National champion (Billingsley) Co-national champion (NCF) Big Ten co-champion
- Conference: Big Ten Conference
- Record: 8–0 (4–0 Big Ten)
- Head coach: Fielding H. Yost (23rd season)
- Offensive scheme: Short punt
- Captain: Harry Kipke
- Home stadium: Ferry Field

Uniform
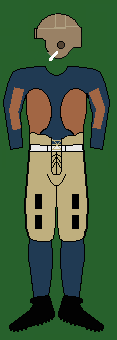

1923 Big Ten Conference football standings
	Conf.					Overall
Team	W		L		T	W		L		T
Illinois +	5	–	0	–	0	8	–	0	–	0
Michigan +	4	–	0	–	0	8	–	0	–	0
Chicago	5	–	1	–	0	7	–	1	–	0
Minnesota	2	–	1	–	1	5	–	1	–	1
Iowa	3	–	3	–	0	5	–	3	–	0
Indiana	2	–	2	–	0	3	–	4	–	0
Wisconsin	1	–	3	–	1	3	–	3	–	1
Ohio State	1	–	4	–	0	3	–	4	–	1
Purdue	1	–	4	–	0	2	–	5	–	1
Northwestern	0	–	6	–	0	2	–	6	–	0
+ – Conference co-champions

The 1923 Michigan football team was an American football team that represented the University of Michigan during the 1923 Big Ten Conference football season. In their 23rd year under head coach Fielding H. Yost, Michigan compiled an undefeated 8–0 record, tied for the Big Ten Conference football championship, and outscored its opponents by a combined total of 150 to 12. The season was part of a 20-game undefeated streak for Michigan that began on October 29, 1921, and continued until October 18, 1924. During the combined 1922 and 1923 seasons, Yost's teams compiled a 14–0–1 record.

Although no system was in place during this era to determine a national champion, the NCAA recognizes as official certain selectors who have sought to establish historic national championships. One of the official selectors, the Billingsley Report, recognizes the 1923 Michigan team as the sole national champion. A second official selector, the National Championship Foundation, recognizes Michigan as co-champion with Illinois. Illinois, led by Red Grange, and Michigan both had perfect records and, despite playing in the same conference, did not play each other during the 1923 season.

Michigan's backfield was led by halfbacks Harry Kipke and Herb Steger and quarterback Irwin Uteritz. Steger was the team's leading scorer, and Kipke, the team captain, developed a reputation as the best punter in college football and later was inducted into the College Football Hall of Fame. On defense, the 1923 team gave up an average of 1.6 points per game, held its first four opponents scoreless, and gave up only one touchdown during the entire season. Left tackle Stanley Muirhead played every minute of Michigan's 1923 season and was one of the team's defensive leaders. Center and placekicker Jack Blott was a consensus first-team pick for the 1923 All-America Team.

Highlights of the 1923 season included a 3–0 victory over Southern Conference champion Vanderbilt, a 19–0 victory over Ohio State before the largest crowd in Ferry Field history and a 10–0 victory over an undefeated Minnesota team that had scored 34 and 20 points against Northwestern and Iowa in the preceding weeks. A 6–3 victory over Wisconsin featured a game-saving "diving shoe-string tackle" by Edliff Slaughter on the last play of the game – a play that Fielding Yost later called "the greatest play in football I ever saw."

== Schedule ==
Date	Time	Opponent	Site	Result	Attendance
October 6		Case*	Ferry Field; Ann Arbor, MI	W 36–0	13,000
October 13	3:00 p. m.	Vanderbilt*	Ferry Field; Ann Arbor, MI	W 3–0	30,000
October 20		Ohio State	Ferry Field; Ann Arbor, MI (rivalry)	W 23–0	50,000
October 27		Michigan Agricultural*	Ferry Field; Ann Arbor, MI (rivalry)	W 37–0	
November 3		at Iowa	Iowa Field; Iowa City, IA	W 9–3	17,000
November 10		Quantico Marines*	Ferry Field; Ann Arbor, MI	W 26–6	40,000
November 17		at Wisconsin	Camp Randall Stadium; Madison, WI	W 6–3	25,000
November 24		Minnesota^{†}	Ferry Field; Ann Arbor, MI (Little Brown Jug)	W 10–0	42,000
*Non-conference game; ^{†}Homecoming; All times are in Eastern time

== Preseason ==
Michigan's 1922 team finished its season undefeated with a record of 6–0–1 and tied with Iowa team for the Big Ten Conference football championship. Several key players from the 1922 team did not return in 1923, including fullback Franklin Cappon, right end Paul Goebel, and left end Bernard Kirk. Cappon and Goebel were lost to graduation, and Kirk had died from injuries sustained in an automobile accident in December 1922. There were, however, several starters returning from the undefeated 1922 team, including halfback Harry Kipke, quarterback Irwin Uteritz, center Jack Blott, and tackle Stanley Muirhead.

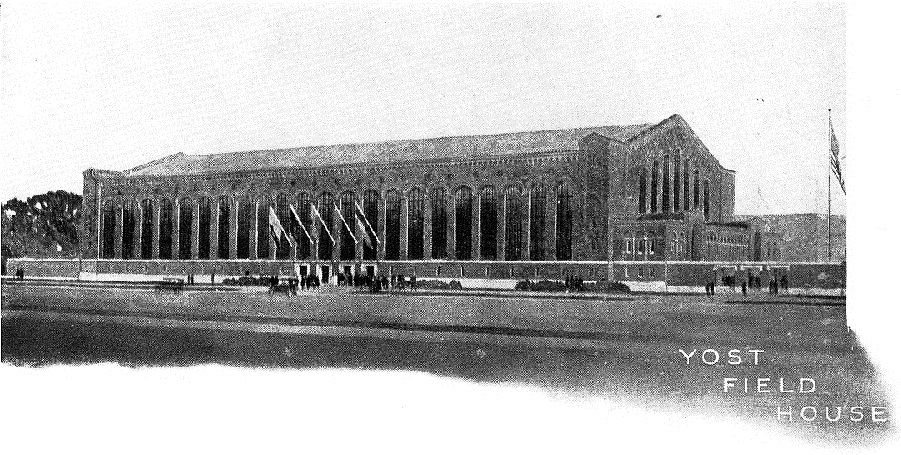
Yost Field House, dedicated on November 10, 1923

In May 1923, the University of Michigan's Board of Control of Athletics announced that the new field house under construction would be named after Fielding H. Yost, who had been Michigan's head football coach for 22 years. At the time of its completion in the fall of 1923, Yost Field House was "the largest structure for competitive athletics in the world." The structure was designed to have a seating capacity of 12,500, an indoor track with a 75-foot straightaway, basketball courts, indoor practice facilities for the football and baseball teams, locker and shower facilities for 4,200, athletic association offices, and trophy rooms.

== Game summaries ==
=== Week 1: Case ===
Week 1: Case at Michigan

Team	1	2	3	4	Total
Case	0	0	0	0	0
• Michigan	6	13	7	10	36

- Date: October 6
- Location: Ferry Field
  Ann Arbor, MI
- Game attendance: 15,000
- Referee: Harry Costello

Michigan opened its 1923 season on October 6 with a 36–0 victory over the Case Scientific School in front of a crowd of more than 15,000 spectators at Ferry Field. Michigan had opened its season with a home game against Case 16 times between 1902 and 1923.

Michigan's first touchdown was scored by right halfback Herb Steger on a 15-yard pass from left halfback Harry Kipke. Steger missed the extra point kick. Then, in the second quarter, Steger scored his second touchdown on a 53-yard run through right tackle. Kipke's drop kick for the extra point was blocked, and Michigan led, 12–0. Kipke also missed a drop kick for field goal in the second quarter. Still in the second quarter, Steger scored his third touchdown on a pass from quarterback Irwin Uteritz. Kipke's drop kick for extra point was good, and Michigan led, 19–0, at halftime.

On Michigan's second play from scrimmage in the second half, William Herrnstein, substituting for Kipke, ran 28 yards for a touchdown. Jack Blott kicked the extra point, and Michigan led, 26–0. In the fourth quarter, Kipke kicked a field goal from the 45-yard line. Michigan's final touchdown was scored by Frederick Parker, substituting for Uteritz at quarterback, on a fourth down run from inside the one-yard line, and Kipke drop kicked for the extra point.

Michigan's starting lineup in the game was Philip Marion (left end), Stanley Muirhead (left tackle), Harold Steele (left guard), Jack Blott (center), Harry Hawkins (right tackle), Ed Vandervoort (right guard), Louis Curran (right end), Irwin Uteritz (quarterback), Harry Kipke (left halfback), Herb Steger (right halfback), and James Miller (fullback).

=== Week 2: Vanderbilt ===
Week 2: Vanderbilt at Michigan

Team	1	2	3	4	Total
Vanderbilt	0	0	0	0	0
• Michigan	0	3	0	0	3

- Date: October 13
- Location: Ferry Field
  Ann Arbor, MI
- Game start: 3:00 p. m.
- Game attendance: 30,000
- Referee: McDonald

On October 13, 1923, Michigan defeated the Southern Conference co-champion Vanderbilt Commodores, 3–0, at Ferry Field. Michigan's victory snapped a 20-game unbeaten streak for Vanderbilt that dated back to November 1920. Vanderbilt was coached by Dan McGugin, who had played for Yost's Michigan teams in 1901 and 1902 and had been an assistant coach for Michigan in 1903. During McGugin's tenure at Vanderbilt, Michigan played nine games against the Commodores from 1905 to 1923, with Michigan winning eight games and playing to a tie in 1922. Vanderbilt returned nine of eleven starters from its 1922 team that held Michigan scoreless in the prior year's game and was regarded as having as strong a team as it had in 1922.

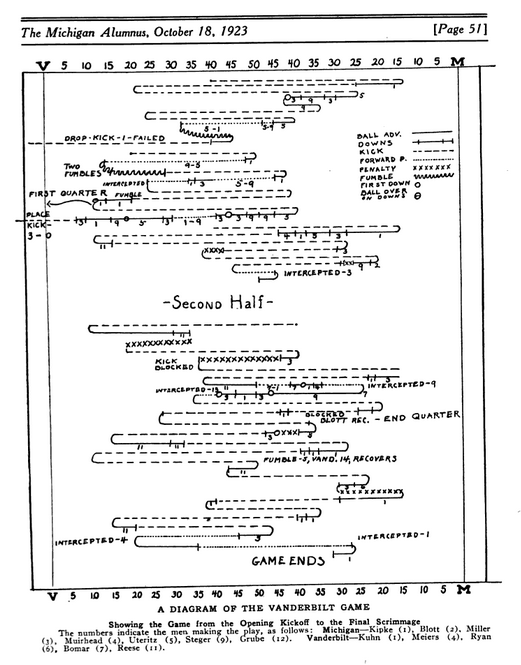
Diagram of the Vanderbilt game.

The game's only points were scored on a field goal in the second quarter. After Michigan drove to the Vanderbilt seven-yard line, the Wolverines lost yardage on first and second down. On third down, Jack Blott was called into the backfield from his normal position at center. Blott kicked a field goal from the 15-yard line. A wire service account of the game noted, "Both played crafty football, the fumbling that tended to mar the game being more than offset by swift, dashing interception of passes while the work of the linesmen on both sides was at top form." The Michigan Alumnus summarized the game thus: "Never surely was a game more lacking in spectacular features and thrills. For a good part of the time it gave one the same sort of feeling which was so common during the Great War, when a gain of a few yards was a matter for rejoicing, and it was hard to believe that even the most dashing attack could accomplish any lasting results."

The game featured few penalties, no injuries, and few substitutions. Michigan made only three substitutions, and Vanderbilt none. Michigan completed five out of 16 passes for 90 yards. Vanderbilt completed just one of five for a nine-yard gain. Two field goal attempts by Kipke failed. One was blocked and another rolled under the cross bar. The one other long gain of the day was a 20-yard run late in the third quarter from Herb Steger. The run came just after Vanderbilt had advanced its furthest into Michigan territory and had its drive ended by a Steger interception. Vanderbilt never advanced far enough to attempt a field goal.

Vanderbilt's best player that day was Hek Wakefield, showcasing his skill in tackling Michigan's runners. "I never saw a greater exhibition of end play," said Fielding Yost, referring to Wakefield.

Michigan's starting lineup against Vanderbilt was Philip Marion (left end), Stanley Muirhead (left tackle), Edliff Slaughter (left guard), Jack Blott (center), Harold Steele (right guard), Ed Vandervoort (right tackle), Louis Curran (right end), Irwin Uteritz (quarterback), Harry Kipke (left halfback), Herb Steger (right halfback), and James Miller (fullback).

=== Week 3: Ohio State ===
Week 3: Ohio State at Michigan

Team	1	2	3	4	Total
Ohio State	0	0	0	0	0
• Michigan	0	3	7	13	23

- Date: October 20
- Location: Ferry Field
  Ann Arbor, MI
- Game attendance: 43,000
- Referee: Walter Eckersall

On October 20, 1923, Michigan defeated Ohio State, 23–0, in the 20th installment of the Michigan–Ohio State football rivalry with Michigan having compiled a 14–3–2 record in the previous games.

The game attracted between 45,000 and 50,000 spectators, setting a new record as "the greatest throng that ever jammed historic Ferry field." The crowd included an estimated 15,000 Ohio State fans with thousands having driven to the game by automobile and thousands more in special trains from Columbus. At least six airplanes were also employed to bring spectators to Ann Arbor, including two brothers flying to Ann Arbor from Denver and several Marines from Quantico, Virginia, flying in four airplanes to scout the Michigan team for the upcoming match against the Quantico Marines. Tickets sold for prices as high as $50, and 16 persons were jailed for ticket scalping. The Michigan athletic department reported that 55,000 ticket applications had been denied, requiring "the entire time of four men for the past three weeks to return money for which tickets were not available."

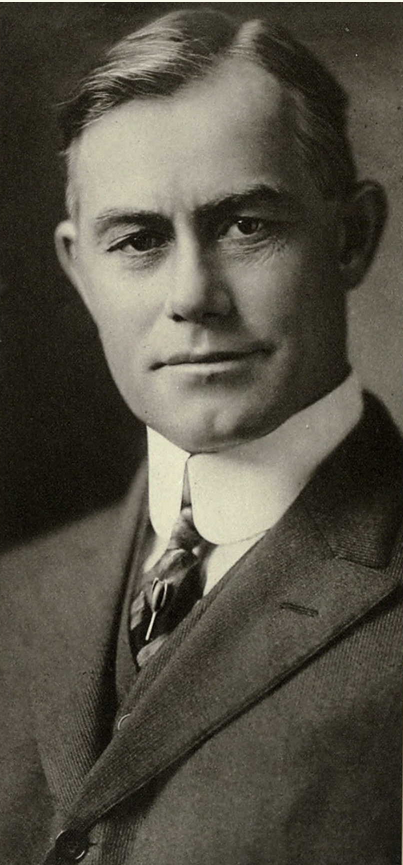
Fielding H. Yost

Coach Yost announced on October 18, two days before the game, that he would retire as Michigan's football coach at the end of the year, though he would remain the school's athletic director. After Yost's announcement, sports columnist Billy Evans called Yost "one of the greatest mentors in the history of the game" and "one of the pioneers in Western Conference football."

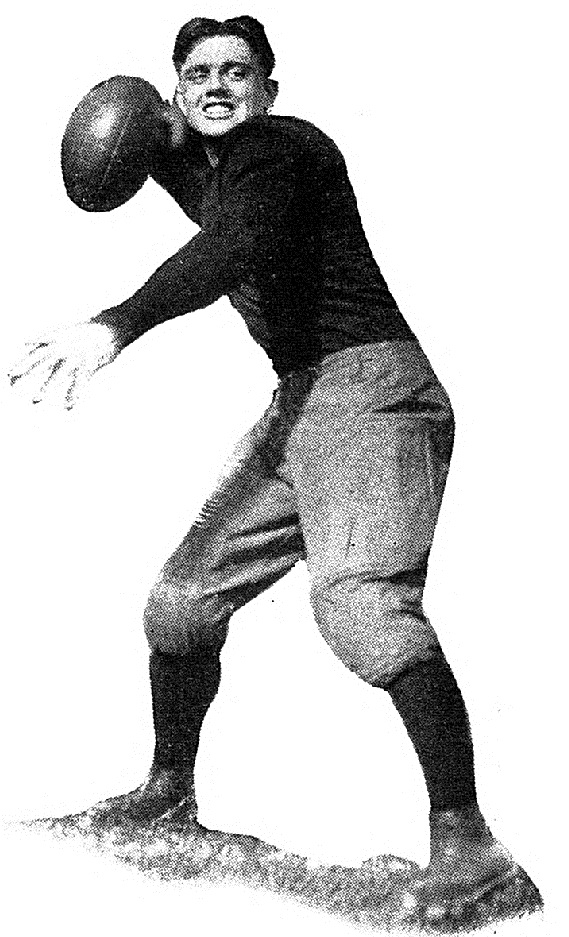
Irwin Uteritz

The only points scored in the first half came on a field goal by Jack Blott. The score followed a drive that started at Ohio State's 49-yard line and featured a 24-yard gain on Michigan's first pass, a ten-yard toss from Irwin Uteritz to Harry Kipke who ran the ball to the Ohio State 23-yard line. On the next play, Michigan ran a triple pass with Kipke carrying the ball to Ohio State's 11-yard line. The Buckeyes' defense held, and Blott kicked a field goal from placement from the 17-yard line.

In the third quarter, Blott missed a field goal on Michigan's first drive, with the ball going right of the crossbar. Later in the third quarter, Michigan extended its lead after blocking a punt by Hoge Workman in Ohio State territory. Michigan took the ball to the Ohio State 16-yard line on a pass from Uteritz to Louis Curran. On the next play, Uteritz completed a pass to Herb Steger who ran the last 15 yards for a touchdown. Blott place-kicked the extra point. Early in the fourth quarter, Michigan scored its second touchdown on a pass from Uteritz to Kipke that netted 37 yards. Blott again place-kicked the extra point. Michigan's final touchdown followed an interception by Steger that gave the Wolverines the ball at Ohio State's 42-yard line. On a series of running plays, Michigan drove the ball inside Ohio State's ten-yard line. Charles Grube, substituting for Jim Miller, ran on fourth down and gained four yards to Ohio State's one-yard line. On first down from the one-yard line Grube fumbled, but recovered the ball. On the next play, Steger ran through the right guard for a touchdown. Michigan tried a pass for the extra point, but the pass from Uteritz was incomplete. Ohio State never advanced the ball inside Michigan's 40-yard line.

Michigan's 23-point margin was its largest over the Buckeyes since 1909 and "one of the most startling upsets of the 1923 Western Conference championship season." Michigan's offense was led by its passing game, completing five of nine passes for long gains and without any interceptions. Ohio State, on the other hand, completed only three of 12 passes. As one Ohio newspaper noted, "The Wolverines made almost uncanny use of the aerial attack, their peculiar use of this play turning the battle. Ohio held Michigan fairly well when the Wolverines employed straight football but the over-head game seemed to mystify the Buckeyes completely."

Michigan's starting lineup against Ohio State was Marion (left end), Muirhead (left tackle), Slaughter (left guard), Blott (center), Steele (right guard), Vandervoort (right tackle), Curran (right end), Uteritz (quarterback), Kipke (left halfback), Steger (right halfback), and Miller (fullback). Players appearing as substitutes for Michigan included Hawkins, Rockwell, Grube, Herrnstein, and Witherspoon. Michigan converted ten first downs in the game to five for Ohio State.

=== Week 4: Michigan Agricultural ===
Week 4: Michigan Agricultural at Michigan

Team	1	2	3	4	Total
Michigan Agricultural	0	0	0	0	0
• Michigan	12	7	0	18	37

- Date: October 27
- Location: Ferry Field
  Ann Arbor, MI
- Referee: Harry Costello

On October 27, Michigan defeated the Michigan Agricultural Aggies (now known as the Michigan State Spartans), 37–0, at Ferry Field. The game featured a battle between brothers Harry Kipke, left end for Michigan, and Ray "Stub" Kipke, left end for Michigan Agricultural. Michigan's Kipke had the better game, scoring two touchdowns and punting five times for a 48-yard average. Kipke scored Michigan's first touchdown when he took the ball in punt formation and ran 20 yards around his right end. Kipke then missed the extra point. Michigan's second touchdown was scored on a short run by Miller from inside the one-yard line, and Jack Blott's kick for extra point was blocked, and Michigan led, 12–0, at the end of the first quarter. In the second quarter, Michigan scored on a short run by Kipke, and the extra point was scored on a pass from Kipke to Louis Curran. Michigan led, 19–0, at halftime.

The Aggies held the Wolverines scoreless in the third quarter, but Michigan extended its lead with three touchdowns in the fourth quarter. The fourth quarter scoring began with a fourth down pass from Irwin Uteritz to Charles Grube. Blott's extra point was blocked and Michigan led 25–0. Frederick Parker scored next on a three-yard run, and Tod Rockwell's kick for extra point was blocked. Fullback Richard Vick scored Michigan's final touchdown on a 30-yard run around the left end. Parker's dropkick for extra point was wide and low. Vick reportedly "played brilliantly, plunging and passing for repeated gains," revealing "a wealth of strength among the Michigan reserves." The 1924 Michiganensian reported that the Aggies "furnished a good practice game" and noted every player on the Michigan bench was able to play in the game.

Michigan's starting lineup against the Aggies was Philip Marion (left end), Stanley Muirhead (left tackle), Harry Hawkins (left guard), Jack Block (center), Harold Steele (right guard), Ed Vandervoort (right tackle), Irwin Uteritz (quarterback), Harry Kipke (left halfback), William Herrnstein (right halfback), and James Miller (fullback).

=== Week 5: at Iowa ===
Week 5: Michigan at Iowa

Team	1	2	3	4	Total
• Michigan	9	0	0	0	9
Iowa	0	3	0	0	3

- Date: November 3
- Location: Iowa Field
  Iowa City, IA
- Game attendance: 17,000
- Referee: James Masker (Northwestern)

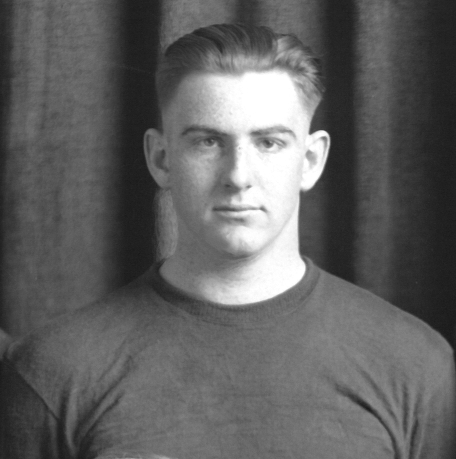
Center Jack Blott scored the winning touchdown against Iowa.

On November 3, Michigan traveled to Iowa City to play Howard Jones' Iowa Hawkeyes in its first road game of the 1923 season. Michigan and Iowa had tied for the Western Conference championship in 1922, but the two teams had not played each other in 21 years.

Michigan defeated Iowa, 9–3. In the first quarter, Harry Kipke punted from midfield, and his kick grazed an Iowa lineman. Iowa's Wesley Fry let the ball roll into the end zone, not realizing it had been touched by one of his teammates. Jack Blott, Michigan's 200-pound center, raced down the field and jumped on the ball. Referee James Masker awarded a touchdown to Michigan. Iowa fans, having not seen the ball touch any of the Hawkeyes, reacted angrily to the ruling. Blott won praise for his "quick thinking" in racing to recover the fumble, with one writer noting:

When Jack Blott, Michigan's star center, fell on a loose ball, in back of the goal line in the recent Michigan-Iowa game, he performed a feat which is rarely accomplished on the gridiron. Not only did it win the contest for the Wolverines, but it marked one of the few times wherein a center is credited with having scored a touchdown ... Blott's performance was all the more unique in that he passed the ball for Kipke's attempted drop kick and then raced down the field ahead of any of the other players in time to drop on the leather as it bounded across the final chalk mark . . .

A few minutes later, Kipke drop-kicked for a field goal from the Iowa 40-yard line to give Michigan a 9–0 lead. In the second quarter, Iowa scored on a drop-kick field goal by Fisher. Iowa's three points on the field goal were the first points allowed by Michigan during the 1923 season. After the first quarter, the Michigan offense was held scoreless, unable to make "any headway thru Iowa's big black line."

Michigan's lineup against Iowa was Philip Marion (left end), Stanley Muirhead (left tackle), Edliff Slaughter (left guard), Jack Blott (center), Harold Steele (right guard), Ed Vandervoort (right tackle), Louis Curran (right end), Irwin Uteritz (quarterback), Harry Kipke (left halfback), Herb Steger (right halfback), and James Miller (fullback). The only two substitutions for Michigan were George Babcock for Vandervoort and Charles Grube for Miller.

=== Week 6: Quantico Marines ===
Week 6: Quantico Marines at Michigan

Team	1	2	3	4	Total
Quantico Marines	6	0	0	0	6
• Michigan	0	7	7	12	26

- Date: November 10
- Location: Ferry Field
  Ann Arbor, MI
- Game attendance: 42,000
- Referee: James Masker (Northwestern)

In the sixth game of the 1923 season, Michigan faced the United States Marine Corps football team from the Quantico Marine Corps Base in Virginia. The game was attended by 2,000 Marines and by several dignitaries, including Secretary of the Navy Edwin Denby, who had played football at Michigan in the 1890s, and Marine Corps Commandant John A. Lejeune. Before the game, dedication ceremonies were held for the newly constructed Yost Field House. Speaking to thousands jammed into the building for the dedication, University of Michigan President Marion LeRoy Burton said, "May this building, bearing his name, stand through the years as a silent but compelling witness to the worth of loyalty, integrity, and manhood."

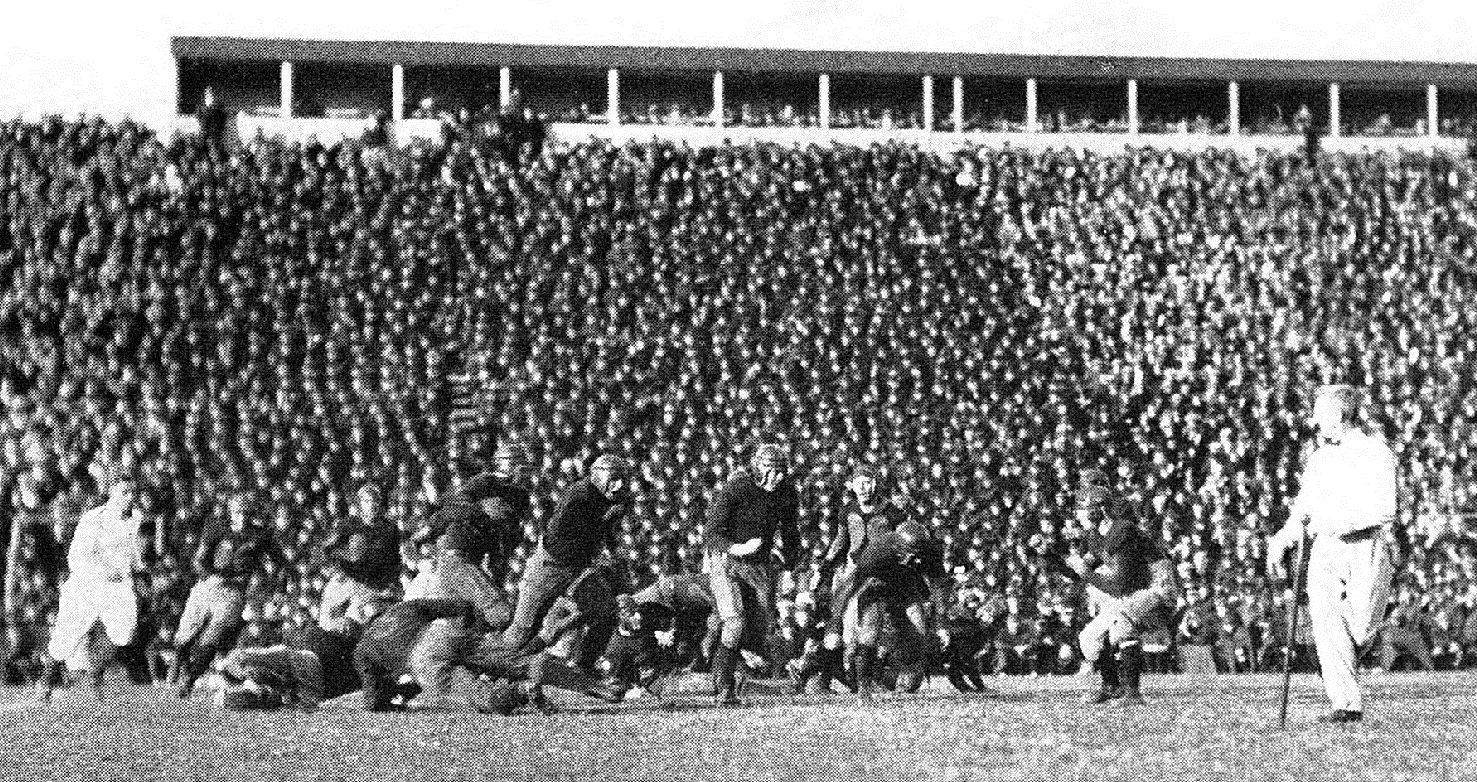
Kipke running against Quantico Marines.

Michigan defeated the Marines, 26–6. The Marines took the opening kickoff and drove 89 yards for a touchdown, using "a bewildering aerial and line attack." The Marines' touchdown was the only one scored on Michigan during the entire 1923 season. The Marines led 6–0 at the end of the first quarter, but Michigan then scored 26 unanswered points.

Quarterback Irwin Uteritz led Michigan's comeback, scoring a touchdown in the second quarter on a dive between center Jack Blott's legs. Uteritz kicked the extra point and added his eighth point on an extra point in the third quarter. In the fourth quarter, Uteritz "limped perceptibly" after a hard tackle, but remained in the game until Michigan's trainer ordered him off the field. After the game, it was determined that Uteritz's leg had been broken, and he was unable to play in the last two games of the season. On learning that Uteritz would be unable to play in the remaining games, Coach Yost told reporters, "There goes half of the football team. . . . He was the best field general I ever had."

Ferdinand Rockwell replaced Uteritz at quarterback. When Rockwell came into the game, Michigan lined up for a field goal with Rockwell holding the ball. As the Marines came through to block the kick, Rockwell jumped to his feet and ran the ball 26 yards for a touchdown. The touchdown run was Rockwell's first play for Michigan's varsity team. In addition to the touchdowns by Uteritz and Rockwell, Michigan also scored on touchdowns by Jim Miller and Frederick Parker. Due to an error by the official timekeeper, time was not called at the end of the first quarter, and the quarter consumed 33 minutes of playing time before the oversight was discovered. The other three quarters were played for regulation periods of 15 minutes.

Michigan's starting lineup against the Quantico Marines was Marion (left end), Muirhead (left tackle), Slaughter (left guard), Blott (center), Hawkins (right guard), Babcock (right tackle), Neisch (right end), Uteritz (quarterback), Kipke (left halfback), Steger (right halfback), and Miller (fullback).

=== Week 7: at Wisconsin ===
Week 7: Michigan at Wisconsin

Team	1	2	3	4	Total
• Michigan	0	6	0	0	6
Wisconsin	3	0	0	0	3

- Date: November 17
- Location: Camp Randall Stadium
  Madison, WI
- Game attendance: 25,000
- Referee: Walter Eckersall

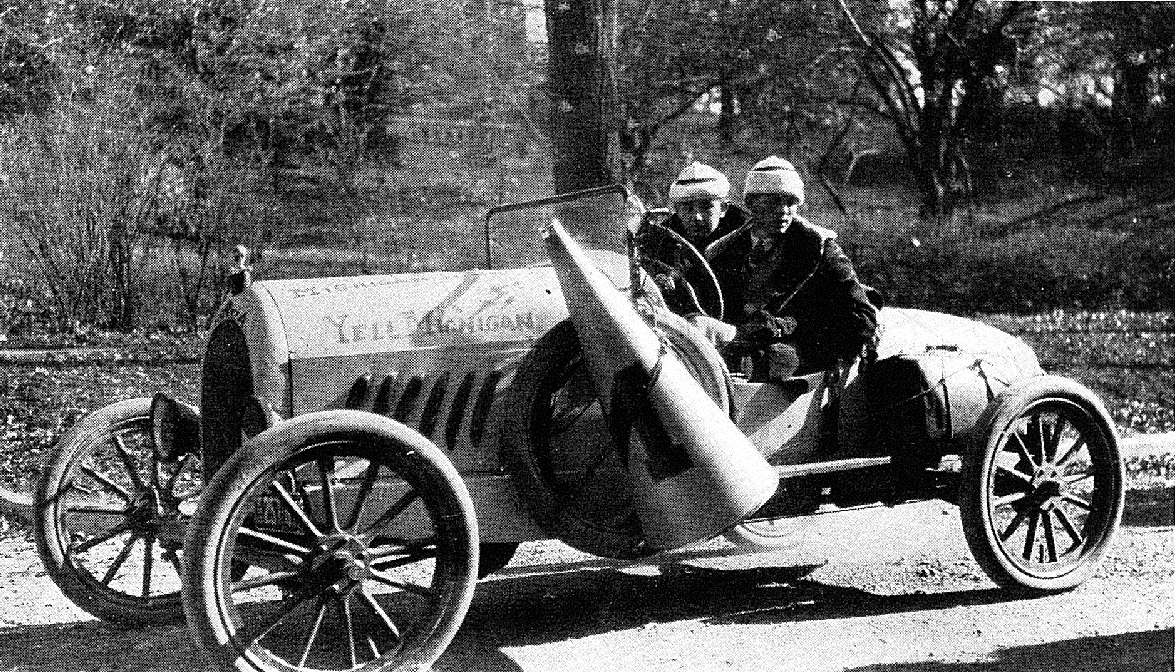
Michigan fans driving to away game, 1923

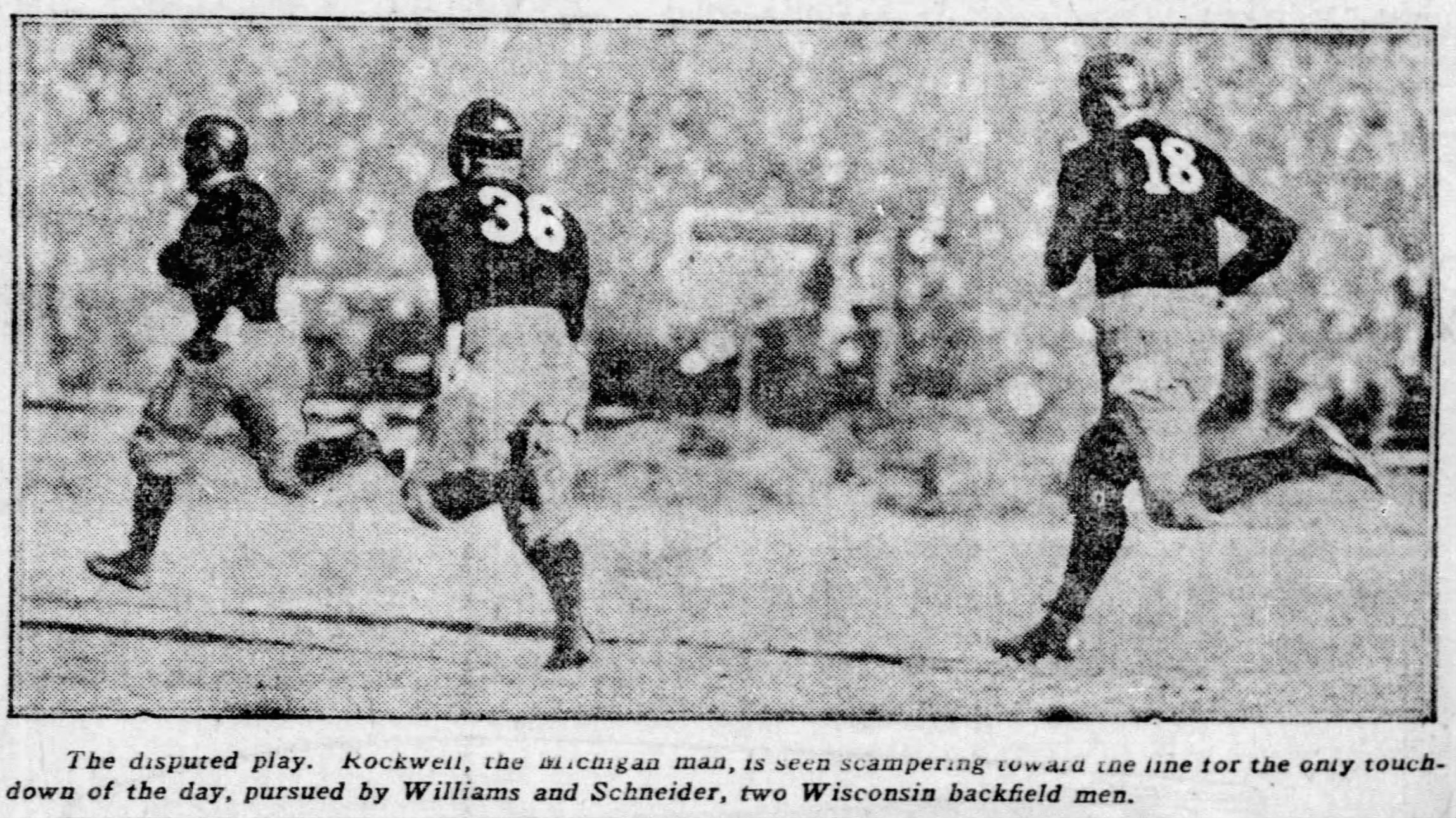
A photograph of Rockwell with the ball on the controversial play that resulted in a touchdown

On November 17, Michigan defeated Wisconsin, 6–3, at Camp Randall Stadium in Madison, Wisconsin. Ferdinand Rockwell was Michigan's starting quarterback, replacing the injured Irwin Uteritz. Rockwell scored Michigan's only points on a controversial play. Rockwell caught a Wisconsin kick and began running with the ball. The ball bounced off his chest at the 32-yard line, and Rockwell picked up the loose ball. Rockwell was hit and appeared to be knocked down, but the whistle was not blown and Rockwell continued running 68 yards through a relaxed Wisconsin secondary, which thought the ball was dead. (Note: Years later, Harry Kipke wrote about the play and described Rockwell's "perfect acrobatic somersault" as he appeared to be down but maintained his balance and ran for the winning touchdown.) Rockwell's performance in the closing games of the 1923 season led sports columnist Billy Evans to write: "Rockwell is one of the best open field runners in the Western Conference. He, more than any other man, saved the Big Ten title for Michigan."

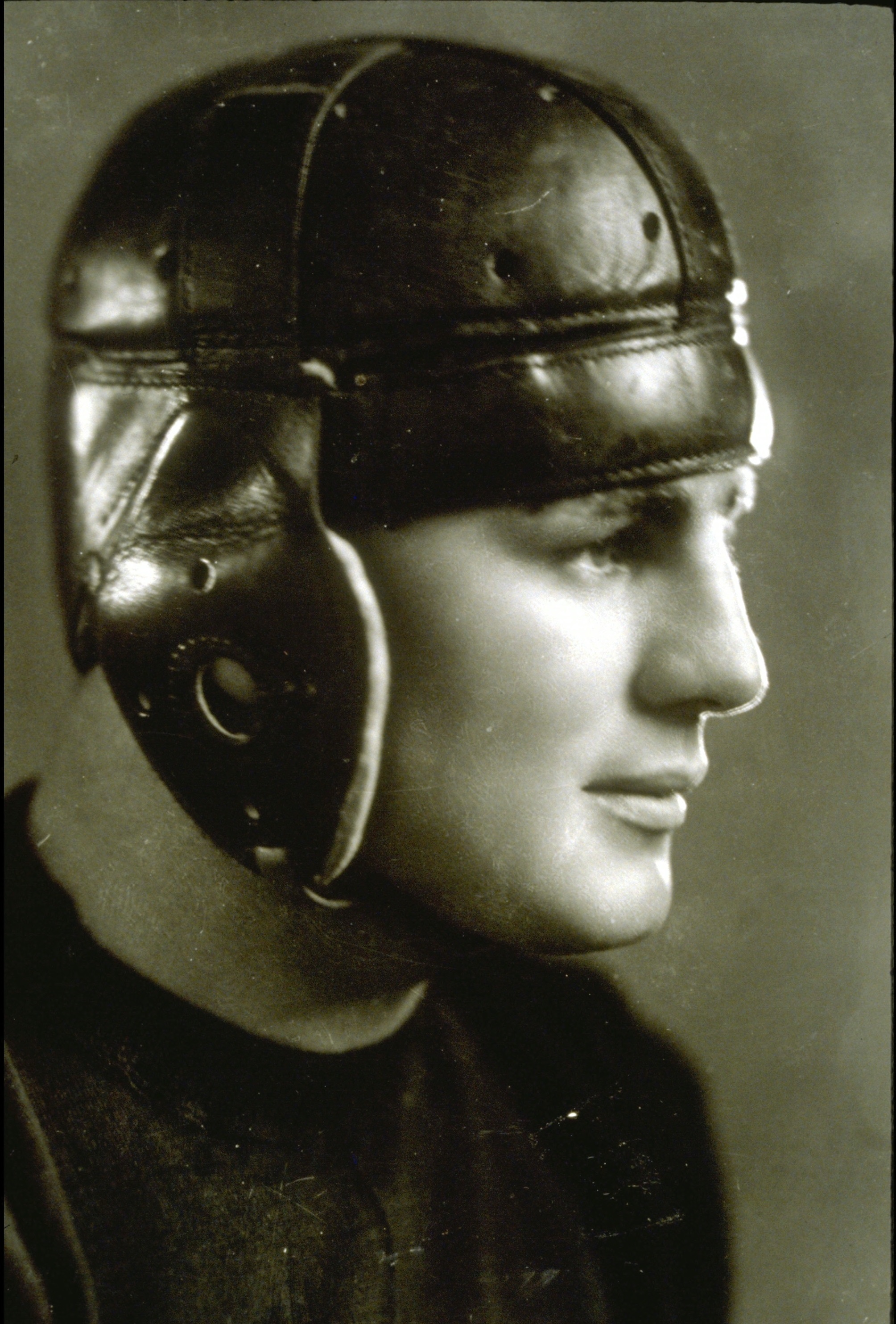
Fielding Yost called Edliff Slaughter's shoe-string tackle against Wisconsin the greatest play he ever saw.

The 1923 Michigan-Wisconsin game ended with a play that Fielding H. Yost later called "the greatest play in football I ever saw." With 18 second left in the game, Wisconsin had the ball at its own 35-yard line and needed to gain 65 yards for a score. A Wisconsin player caught a pass and appeared to be heading to a game-winning touchdown. Yost described Edliff Slaughter's "diving shoe-string tackle" as follows:

Suddenly, with a great burst of speed, a Michigan man went for him, grabbed him and downed him. I looked for the number of the Michigan man. Lo and behold, it was 'Butch' Slaughter, a guard, who, under ordinary circumstances, would have no more business in that part of the field than I would. Down Harris and Slaughter went on our 20-yard line, and with them went the chance of all chances for Wisconsin, for the whistle which ended the game blew at that moment.

Like the prior week's victory over the Quantico Marines, the victory against Wisconsin was costly. All-American center Jack Blott "was carried from the field with a broken ankle" in the second quarter and was unable to play in the final game of the season against Minnesota.

At the conclusion of the game, a crowd of Wisconsin fans surrounded referee Walter Eckersall to protest the decision granting Michigan's touchdown. One of the angry fans reportedly struck Eckersall, who was then escorted from the field by Wisconsin players. The response in Madison was so strong that rumors circulated that Wisconsin intended to sever athletic relations with Michigan.

Michigan's lineup against Wisconsin was Marion (left end), Muirhead (left tackle), Slaughter (left guard), Blott (center), Steele (right guard), Babcock (right tackle), Curran (right end), Rockwell (quarterback), Kipke (left halfback), Steger (right halfback), and Miller (fullback).

=== Week 8: Minnesota ===
Week 8: Minnesota at Michigan

Team	1	2	3	4	Total
Minnesota	0	0	0	0	0
• Michigan	0	7	3	0	10

- Date: November 24
- Location: Ferry Field
  Ann Arbor, MI
- Game attendance: 42,000
- Referee: James Masker (Northwestern)

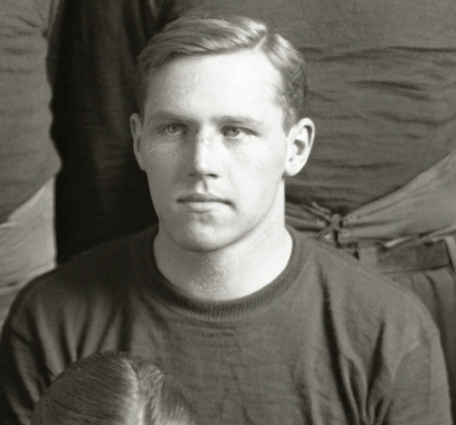
Stanley Muirhead tallied 22 tackles against Minnesota.

Michigan concluded its undefeated season on November 24 with a 10–0 win over Minnesota. The game was played at Ferry Field in front of a crowd of close to 42,000 spectators. The game was the final college football appearance for two All-American halfbacks, Harry Kipke of Michigan and Earl Martineau of Minnesota. Both teams came into the game unbeaten.

Six of Michigan's 11 starters were injured and unavailable to play in the game. Accordingly, Michigan played five starters and six substitutes against the Golden Gophers. Minnesota also suffered a setback when its starting quarterback, Graham, was injured in the first quarter.

Michigan scored the only touchdown of the game in the second quarter on a 51-yard drive that featured a ten-yard run by Harry Kipke and a 12-yard gain on a pass to Steger. With the ball at the Minnesota 31-yard line, fullback Richard Vick passed to quarterback Ferdinand Rockwell. Rockwell caught the pass at the 20-yard line and ran for the touchdown. Rockwell also kicked the extra point to give Michigan a 7–0 lead. In the third quarter, Edliff Slaughter blocked a punt by Martineau, and Dick Babcock recovered the ball at Minnesota's 27-yard line. When Michigan was unable to score, Kipke drop-kicked for a field goal from the 37-yard line. Minnesota's final drive was stopped on an interception by Kipke.

On defense, Michigan shut out a Minnesota offense that had scored 34 points against Northwestern and 20 against Iowa. The Golden Gophers threw eight passes for zero completions and two interceptions. Left tackle Stanley Muirhead, playing his final game for Michigan, was credited with the success of the defense:

In his last game against Minnesota, November 24, Muirhead was everywhere. He made three-fourths of the tackles under punts, and was always on the ball. A check was made during the game of Muirheads's tackles. No less than twenty-two times did this stalwart tackle bring down his man. He was a veritable demon on the field. He could not be stopped. If there is a greater tackle in the country than Stan Muirhead of Michigan he has not yet been seen.

Princeton coach Bill Roper watched the Michigan-Minnesota game as a guest of Fielding Yost. After the game, Roper had high praise for Kipke: "Kipke is the greatest punter I have ever seen ... I have never seen such deadly accuracy ... It was impossible for the Minnesota quarterback to handle Kipke's kicks. Most of them went out of bounds some fifty yards from the line of scrimmage."

Michigan's starting lineup against Minnesota was LeRoy Neisch (left end), Stanley Muirhead (left tackle), Edliff Slaughter (left guard), Robert J. Brown (center), Harry Hawkins (right guard), George Babcock (right tackle), Louis Curran (right end), Tod Rockwell (quarterback), Harry Kipke (left halfback), Herb Steger (right halfback), and Richard Vick (fullback).

== Post-season ==
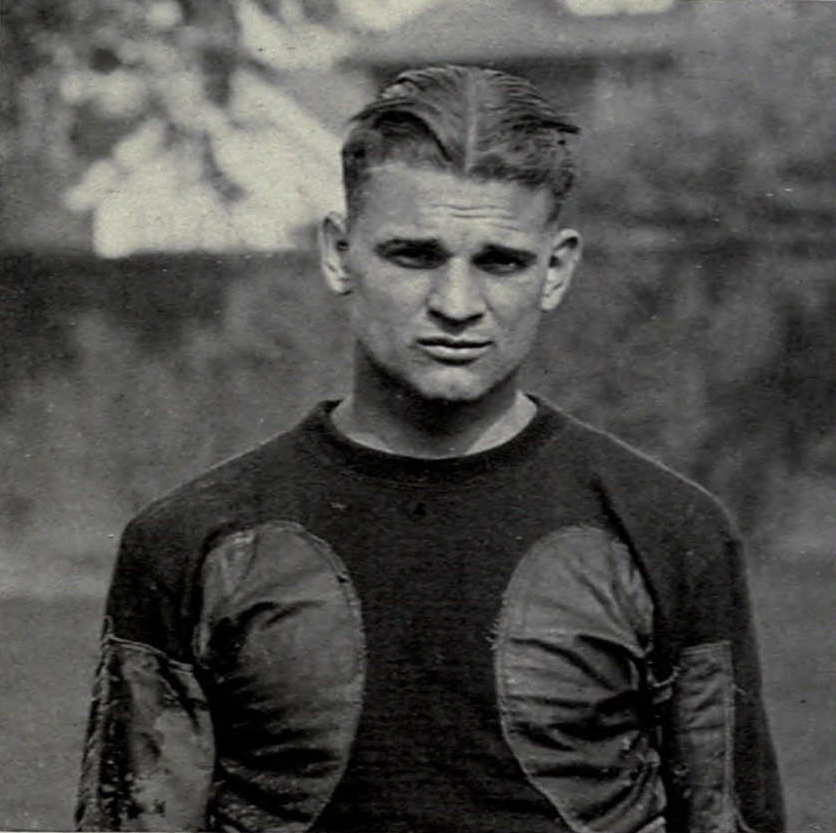
Harry Kipke

The 1923 season ended with Michigan and Illinois both undefeated and tied for the Big Ten football championship. As the two teams did not play each other in 1923, The New York Times looked to their records against common opponents to determine which team was superior. In games against three common opponents (Ohio State, Iowa, and Wisconsin), Michigan had defeated the opponents 38–6 as compared to 28–6 for Illinois. Against Ohio State, Michigan had won 23–0 while Illinois' margin was 9–0. Although there was no AP Poll in 1923 to determine a national champion, Michigan has been recognized as national champions by the Billingsley Report and the National Championship Foundation. Other selectors have recognized Illinois as the national champions of 1923.

Jack Blott was the only Michigan player selected for Walter Camp's first-team All-American squad for 1923. Blott also won first-team honors from Athletic world (based on polling of 500 coaches), Football world magazine, Norman E. Brown (sports editor of the Central Press Association), Davis Walsh (sports editor for the International News Service), and Walter Eckersall.

Halfback Harry Kipke was a consensus first-team All-American in 1922, but in 1923, Red Grange (Illinois) and Harry Wilson (Penn State) were the consensus first-team picks at halfback. The only major selector to award first-team All-American honors to Kipke in 1923 was Lawrence Perry. At the end of the season, Coach Yost added his own praise for Kipke, calling him "the best kicker of all time," and adding: "Never has there been a kicker in all time who could place his ball or time his kicks as well as Kipke."

Other Michigan players included on 1923 All-American teams included Edliff Slaughter (a first-team pick by Lawrence Perry) and Stanley Muirhead (a second-team pick by Athletic world, Norman E. Brown, and Lawrence Perry).

During the 1923 season, Michigan played before crowds totaling 225,000 – exceeding the 1922 attendance by 5,000. Despite the growing demand for seats, Michigan's Board of Regents at the end of November 1923 rejected a proposal to build a large new football stadium. The Regents instead approved a plan to expand the seating capacity at Ferry Field. (Michigan Stadium was not built until 1927.)

== Personnel ==
=== Depth chart ===
The following chart provides a visual depiction of Michigan's lineup during the 1924 season with games started at the position reflected in parentheses. The chart mimics Yost's short punt formation while on offense, with the quarterback under center.

LE
Phil Marion (7)
LeRoy Neisch (1)

LT	LG	C	RG	RT
Stanley Muirhead (8)	Edliff Slaughter (7)	Jack Blott (7)	Harry Hawkins (4)	Ed Vandervoot (5)
Walter Kunow (0)	Harold O. Steele (1)	Robert J. Brown (1)	Harold O. Steele (4)	Dick Babcock (3)
	Howell S. White (0)			

RE
Lou Curran (7)
Leroy Neisch (1)

QB
Irwin Uteritz (6)
Ferdinand Rockwell (2)

LHB	RHB
Harry Kipke (8)	Herb Steger (7)
Charles Grube (0)	William Herrnstein (1)

FB
James K. Miller (6)
Richard Vick (2)

=== Varsity letter winners ===
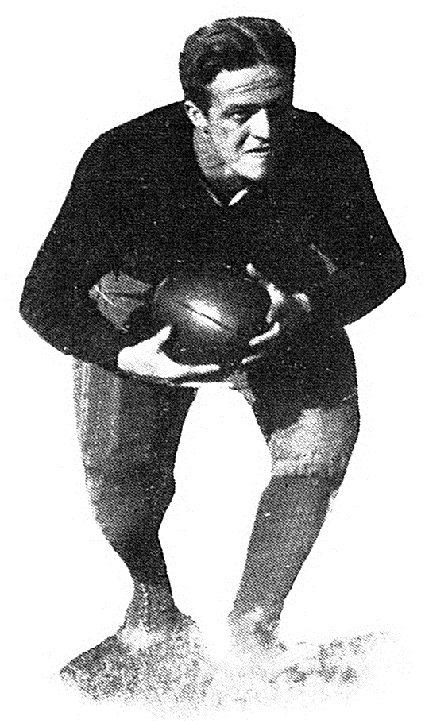
Ferdinand Rockwell

The following players were awarded varsity letters for their participation on the 1923 Michigan football team.

==== Line ====
Number	Player	Position	Games started	Hometown	Prep school	Height	Weight	Age
15	Richard G. "Dick" Babcock	Tackle	3	Royal Oak, Michigan				
2	Jack Blott	Center	7	Girard, Ohio				
22	Robert J. Brown	Center	1	Ypsilanti, Michigan				
16	Louis B. Curran	End	7	Louisville, Kentucky				
4	Stanley Muirhead	Tackle	8	Detroit, Michigan	Northern H.S.			
17	Harry Hawkins	Guard	4	Saginaw, Michigan	Arthur Hill H.S.			
19	Walter Kunow	Tackle	0	Detroit, Michigan				
10	Philip E. Marion	End	7	Detroit, Michigan	Northwestern H.S.			
8	LeRoy Neisch	End	2	Detroit, Michigan	Eastern H.S.			
	Edliff Slaughter	Guard	7	Louisville, Kentucky				
7	Harold O. Steele	Guard	5	Sioux City, Iowa				
6	Ed Vandervoot	Tackle	5	Lansing, Michigan				
27	Howell S. White	Guard	0	Reed City, Michigan				

==== Backfield ====
Number	Player	Position	Games started	Hometown	Prep school	Height	Weight	Age
12	Charles W. Grube	Halfback	0	Saginaw, Michigan				
11	William H. Herrnstein Jr.	Halfback	1	Chillicothe, Ohio				
1	Harry Kipke	Halfback	8	Lansing, Michigan		5'11"	155	24
3	James K. Miller	Fullback	6	Grand Rapids, Michigan	Grand Rapids Central H.S.			
26	Ferdinand Rockwell	Quarterback	2	Jackson, Michigan				
9	Herb Steger	Halfback	7	Oak Park, Illinois	Oak Park H.S.			
5	Irwin Uteritz	Quarterback	6	Oak Park, Illinois	Oak Park H.S.	5'7"	140	24
14	Richard Vick	Fullback	2	Toledo, Ohio	Scott H.S.			

=== aMa letter winners ===
Number	Player	Position	Hometown	Prep school	Height	Weight	Age
32	Merle C. Baker	Quarterback	Royal Oak, Michigan				
21	William J. Donnelly	Tackle	Cadillac, Michigan				
	Henry Ferenz	End	Flint, Michigan				
18	LeRoy G. Heston	Halfback	Detroit, Michigan				
20	Robert Ingle	Guard	Ann Arbor, Michigan				
25	Lowell Palmer	End	Grand Rapids, Michigan				
24	Frederick H. Parker	Halfback	Hastings, Michigan				
28	Donald Swan	Guard	Detroit, Michigan				
29	Fred T. Wall	Center	Birmingham, Michigan				
13	John Witherspoon	End	Detroit, Michigan				

=== Reserves ===
- John K. Atland
- Raymond L. Beecher
- William E. Benson
- Frederick G. Betts
- Joseph G. Blahnick
- Roy E. Butler
- Archibald A. Campbell
- Kenneth H. Campbell
- Howard O. Cedargreen
- Floyd W. Cory
- Thomas E. Daley
- Floyd B. Day
- Carl T. Dust
- Frank M. Edwards
- Percy A. Edwards
- John T. Galarneault
- Hupert G. Goebel
- Louis Goldstein
- Bran F. Gregoric
- John Groshko
- Roy B. Grubb
- William H. Heath
- Raymond S. Heym
- William Hinckley
- Edward K. Isbey
- Harold T. Kinley
- Harry Koenig
- Joseph Kruger
- Earl R. Lillie
- William R. McMillan
- Harold J. Meier
- Frank C. Mote
- Franklyn C. Mugavero
- Chester W. Reichle
- Lyman C. Savage
- Clifford R. Smith
- Charles D. Spencer
- Albert M. Stern
- Kenneth G. Strunk
- Arthur E. Vyse
- John Wagner
- John L. Weiler
- Robert R. Young

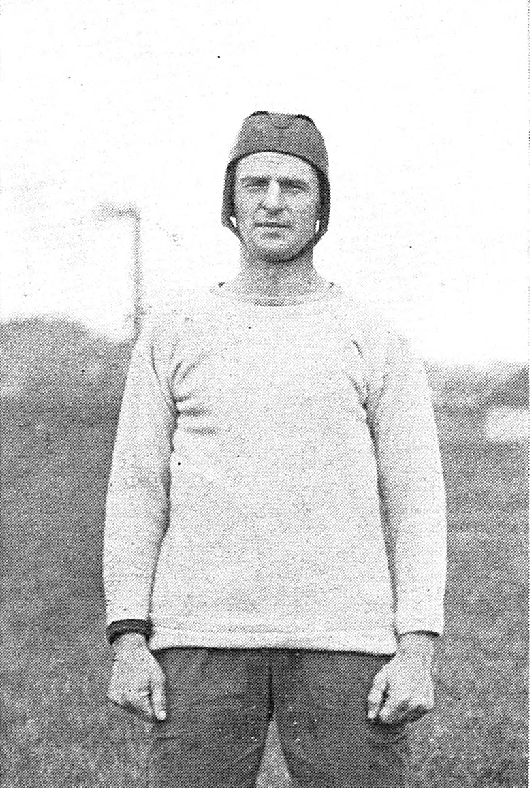
A. J. Sturzenegger was an assistant coach from 1920 to 1923

=== Coaching staff ===
- Coach: Fielding H. Yost
- Assistant coaches: George Little, A. J. Sturzenegger, Tad Wieman, Ernie Vick, Ray Fisher, Edwin Mather
- Trainer: Charles B. Hoyt, William Fallon
- Manager: Donald McCabe
