= 1923 Indiana Hoosiers football team =

American college football season

1923 Indiana Hoosiers football
- Conference: Big Ten Conference
- Record: 3–4 (2–2 Big Ten)
- Head coach: Bill Ingram (1st season)
- Captain: Stewart Butler
- Home stadium: Jordan Field

1923 Big Ten Conference football standings
| | Conf. | | | | | Overall |
| Team | W | | L | | T | W | | L | | T |
|---|---|---|---|---|---|---|---|---|---|---|
| Illinois + | 5 | – | 0 | – | 0 | 8 | – | 0 | – | 0 |
| Michigan + | 4 | – | 0 | – | 0 | 8 | – | 0 | – | 0 |
| Chicago | 5 | – | 1 | – | 0 | 7 | – | 1 | – | 0 |
| Minnesota | 2 | – | 1 | – | 1 | 5 | – | 1 | – | 1 |
| Iowa | 3 | – | 3 | – | 0 | 5 | – | 3 | – | 0 |
| Indiana | 2 | – | 2 | – | 0 | 3 | – | 4 | – | 0 |
| Wisconsin | 1 | – | 3 | – | 1 | 3 | – | 3 | – | 1 |
| Ohio State | 1 | – | 4 | – | 0 | 3 | – | 4 | – | 1 |
| Purdue | 1 | – | 4 | – | 0 | 2 | – | 5 | – | 1 |
| Northwestern | 0 | – | 6 | – | 0 | 2 | – | 6 | – | 0 |
+ – Conference co-champions

The 1923 Indiana Hoosiers football team represented the Indiana Hoosiers in the 1923 Big Ten Conference football season. The Hoosiers played their home games at Jordan Field in Bloomington, Indiana. The team was coached by Bill Ingram, in his first year as head coach.

== Schedule ==
| Date | Opponent | Site | Result |
|---|---|---|---|
| October 6 | DePauw* | Jordan Field; Bloomington, IN | L 0–3 |
| October 13 | vs. Northwestern | Washington Park; Indianapolis, IN | W 7–6 |
| October 20 | Wisconsin | Jordan Field; Bloomington, IN | L 0–52 |
| October 27 | Hanover* | Jordan Field; Bloomington, IN | W 32–0 |
| November 10 | at Chicago | Stagg Field; Chicago, IL | L 0–27 |
| November 17 | Wabash* | Jordan Field; Bloomington, IN | L 6–29 |
| November 24 | Purdue | Jordan Field; Bloomington, IN (rivalry) | W 3–0 |
*Non-conference game
