= 1923 Wisconsin Badgers football team =

American college football season

1923 Wisconsin Badgers football
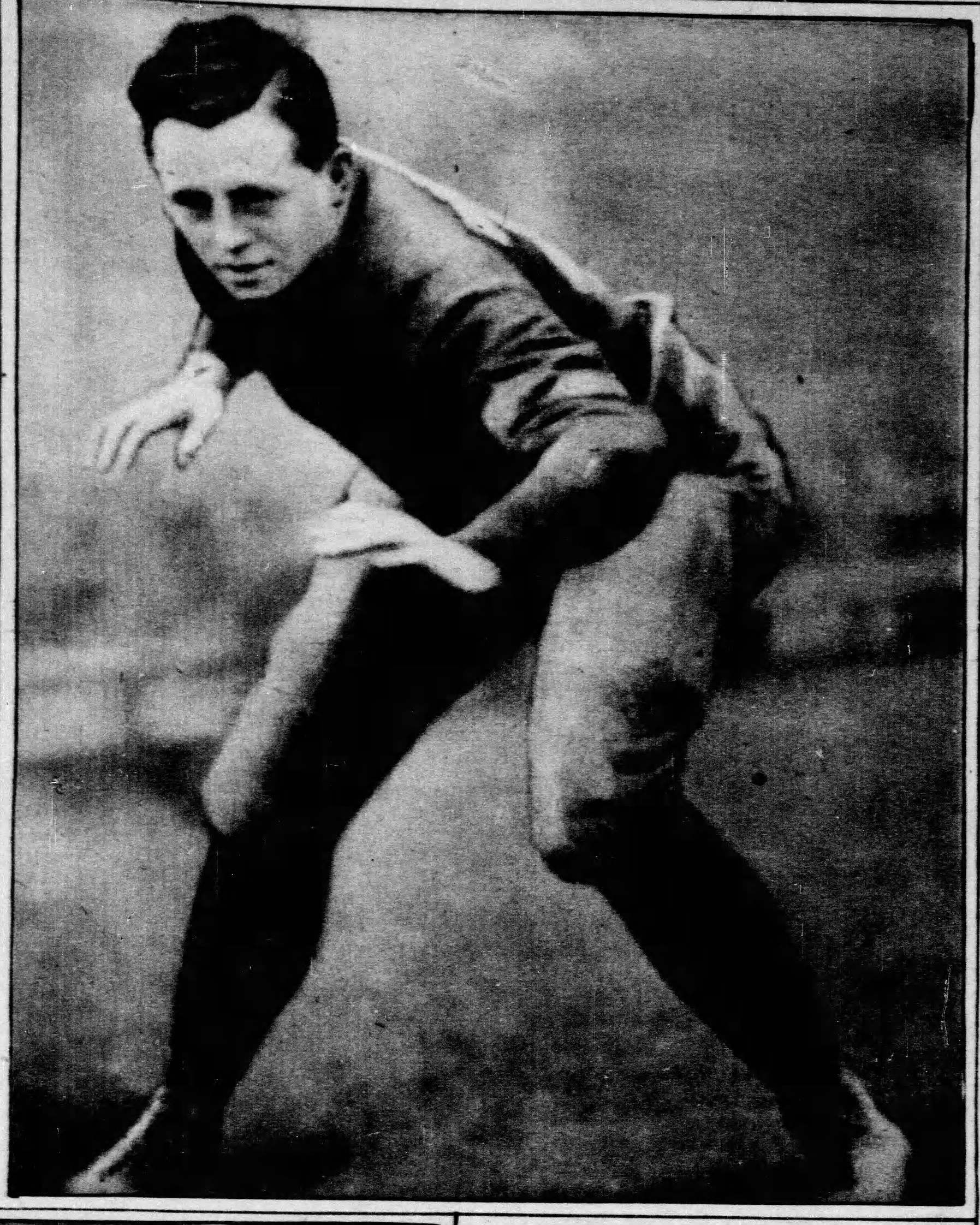
- Team captain and consensus All-American Marty Below
- Conference: Big Ten Conference
- Record: 3–3–1 (1–3–1 Big Ten)
- Head coach: John J. Ryan (1st season)
- Captain: Marty Below
- Home stadium: Camp Randall Stadium

1923 Big Ten Conference football standings
	Conf.					Overall
Team	W		L		T	W		L		T
Illinois +	5	–	0	–	0	8	–	0	–	0
Michigan +	4	–	0	–	0	8	–	0	–	0
Chicago	5	–	1	–	0	7	–	1	–	0
Minnesota	2	–	1	–	1	5	–	1	–	1
Iowa	3	–	3	–	0	5	–	3	–	0
Indiana	2	–	2	–	0	3	–	4	–	0
Wisconsin	1	–	3	–	1	3	–	3	–	1
Ohio State	1	–	4	–	0	3	–	4	–	1
Purdue	1	–	4	–	0	2	–	5	–	1
Northwestern	0	–	6	–	0	2	–	6	–	0
+ – Conference co-champions

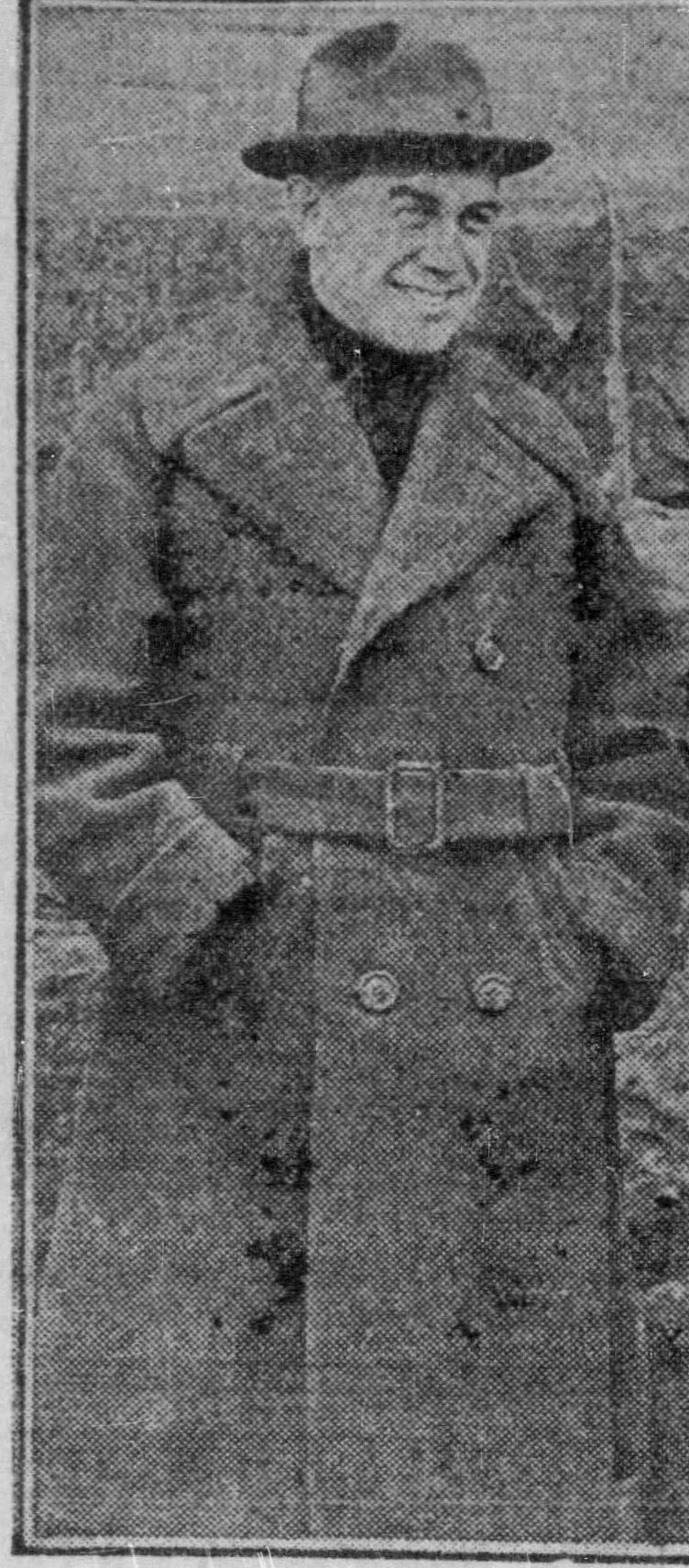
Coach John J. Ryan in 1923

The 1923 Wisconsin Badgers football team was an American football team that represented the University of Wisconsin in the 1923 Big Ten Conference football season. The team compiled a 3–3–1 record (1–3–1 against conference opponents), finished in seventh place in the Big Ten Conference, and outscored its opponents by a combined total of 89 to 32. John J. Ryan was in his first year as Wisconsin's head coach.

Marty Below was the team captain. Below was also a consensus first-team player on the 1923 College Football All-America Team. Guard Adolph Bieberstein and fullback Merrill Taft were selected by Billy Evans for his "National Honor Roll" of the best players in the country.

The team played its home games at Camp Randall Stadium, which had a seating capacity of 14,000. During the 1923 season, the average attendance at home games was 16,387.

== Schedule ==
Date	Opponent	Site	Result	Attendance	Source
October 6	Coe*	Camp Randall Stadium; Madison, WI	W 7–3		
October 13	Michigan Agricultural*	Camp Randall Stadium; Madison, WI	W 21–0		
October 20	at Indiana	Jordan Field; Bloomington, IN	W 52–0		
October 27	Minnesota^{†}	Camp Randall Stadium; Madison, WI (rivalry)	T 0–0	40,000	
November 10	at Illinois	Memorial Stadium; Champaign, IL	L 0–10	30,000	
November 17	Michigan	Camp Randall Stadium; Madison, WI	L 3–6	25,000	
November 24	at Chicago	Stagg Field; Chicago, IL	L 6–13		
*Non-conference game; ^{†}Homecoming
