= Jack Blott =

American baseball and football player (1902–1964)

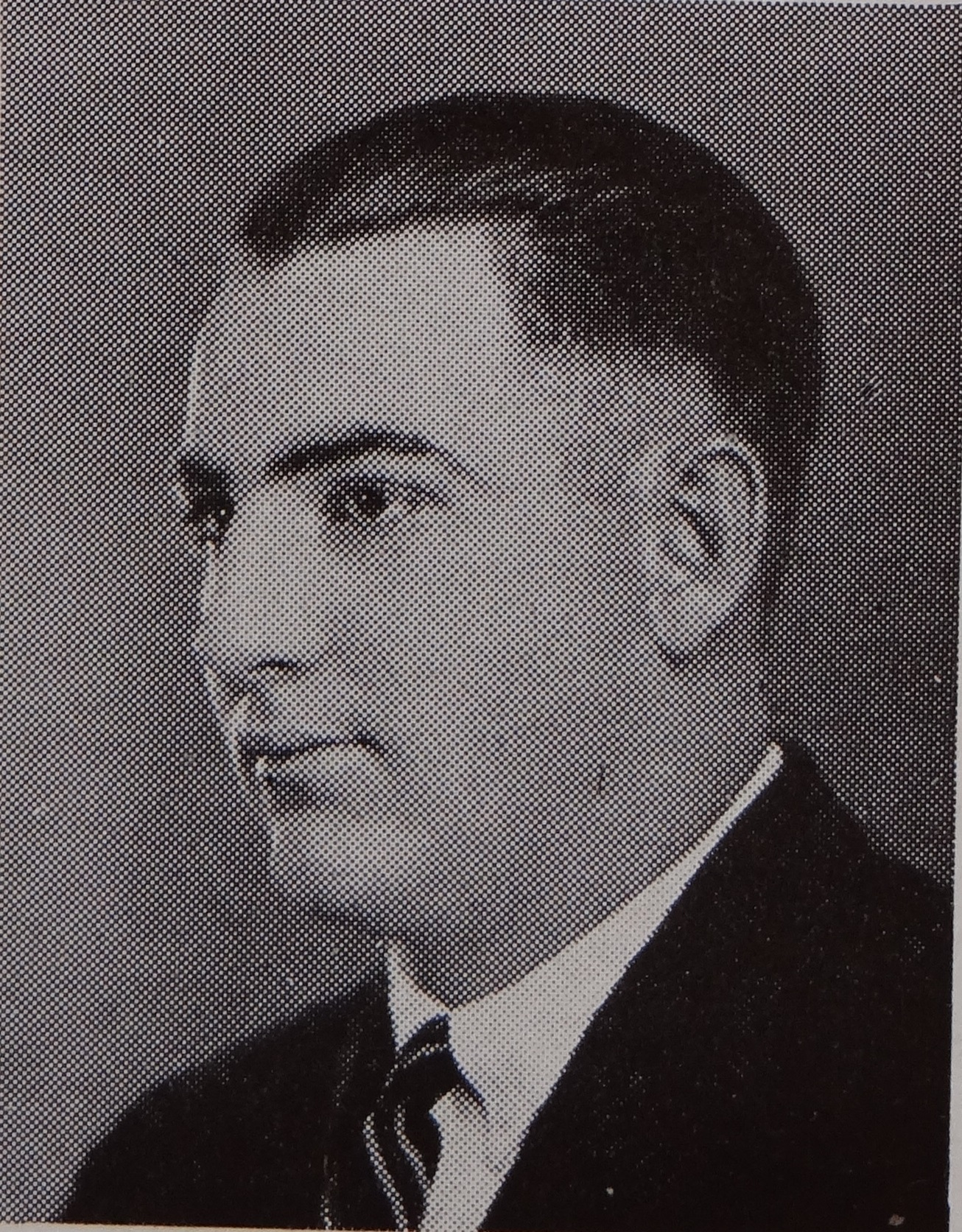
- Blott from 1925 Michiganensian

Biographical details
- Born: August 24, 1902; Girard, Ohio, U.S.
- Died: June 11, 1964 (aged 61); Ann Arbor, Michigan, U.S.
- Education: Michigan

Playing career
- 1922–1923: Michigan Wolverines
- Position: C/K

Coaching career (HC unless noted)
- 1924–1933: Michigan (Football-Asst.)
- 1934–1940: Wesleyan (Football/Baseball)
- 1946–1958: Michigan (Football-OL)

Head coaching record
- Overall: 31–24–1 (football)

Accomplishments and honors

Championships
- National (1923)

Awards
- Consensus All-American (1923); First-team All-Big Ten (1923)

Jack Blott
- Catcher
- Batted: Right Threw: Right

MLB debut
- July 30, 1924, for the Cincinnati Reds

Last MLB appearance
- September 3, 1924, for the Cincinnati Reds

MLB statistics
- Batting average: .000
- At bats: 1
- Games Played: 2
- Stats at Baseball Reference

Teams
- Cincinnati Reds (1924)

Jack Leonard Blott (August 24, 1902 – June 11, 1964) was an All-American football center and place kicker for the University of Michigan Wolverines from 1922 to 1923. He was also a baseball catcher for the Wolverines from 1922 to 1924. After a two-game Major League Baseball career with the Cincinnati Reds in 1924, he worked as Michigan’s line coach from 1924–1933 and 1946–1958. From 1934–1940, he was the head football coach at Wesleyan University.

== All-American center at Michigan ==
=== 1922 season ===
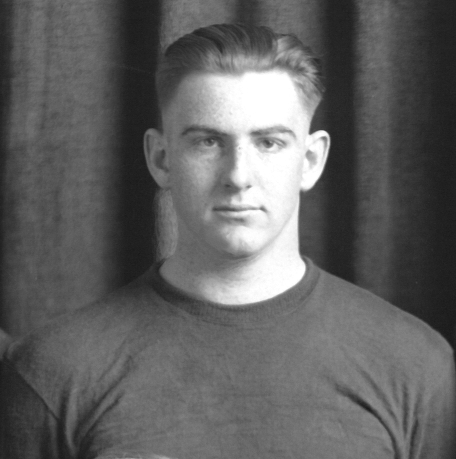
Blott in 1922

In 1922, Blott succeeded All-American and College Football Hall of Famer Ernie Vick as Michigan’s center. Reporters drew similarities between the two: "In the first place, they are of very similar build and Blott now weighs within two pounds of Vick’s playing weight. Both Vick and Blott played fullback in high school and came to Michigan without any experience in the line. Both learned to pass from center, a duty the importance of which very few spectators ever realize, with remarkable ease and within a short time both were unusually accurate."

The 1922 team, led by All-American Harry Kipke, went 6–0–1 and finished in a tie with Iowa for the Big Ten Conference championship. The only blemish was a scoreless tie with Vanderbilt in the second game of the season. The Michigan defense gave up only 13 points during the entire season, outscoring opponents, 183–13.

=== 1923 season ===
The 1923 Michigan team went 8–0 and outscored opponents 150–12. The Big Ten Conference ended up with two undefeated teams in Illinois and Michigan, and though the two teams did not play in 1923, Illinois was widely viewed as the National Champion in 1923. However, the Billingsley service ranked Michigan as the National Champions.

One writer noted that the 1923 Michigan team lacked brawn, with the exception of Blott who was the “one man of ideal physical properties.” That writer also noted: “Blott, big and powerful, also has intellect.” At the start of the 1923 season, Michigan's Coach Fielding H. Yost tried playing Blott at fullback, but quickly moved him back to center, with additional responsibility for kicking field goals.

After an easy opening win against Case Institute of Technology (36–0), the Wolverines faced the Vanderbilt Commodores on October 13, 1923. The Commodores had held the Wolverines to a scoreless tie in 1922 and nearly did so again in 1923. The Wolverines won, 3–0, and Blott’s field goal from the 15-yard line was the only scoring.

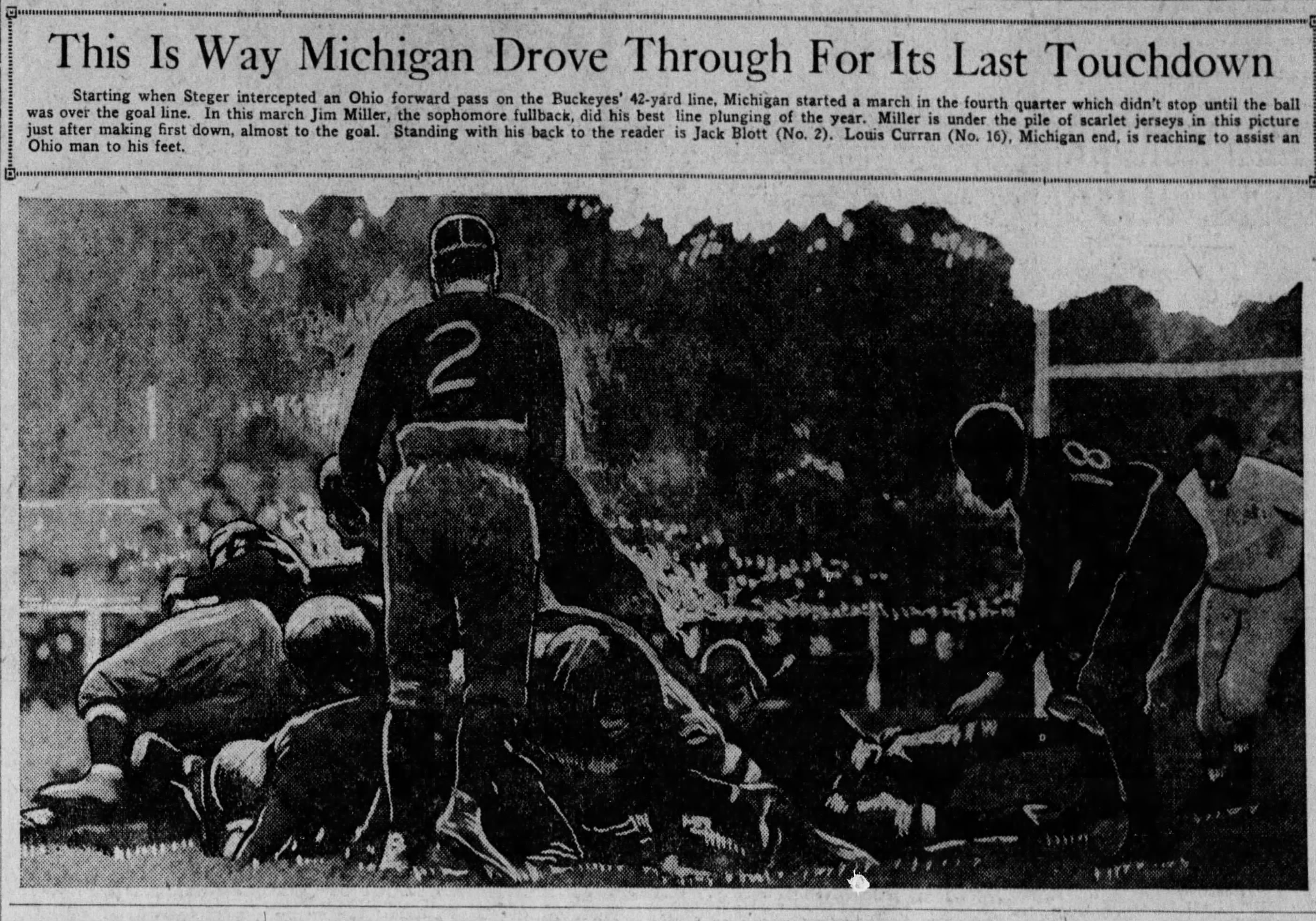
Blott in action during the October 20, 1923 game against the Ohio State Buckeyes

After the Vanderbilt game, Michigan went on to convincing wins over Ohio State (23–0) and Michigan Agricultural College (37–0).

In the Iowa game on November 3, 1923, Blott scored Michigan’s only touchdown in a close 9-3 win over the 1922 Big Ten champions. Blott’s score was described as “a very fluky touchdown, earned through the Blott’s quick thinking." One writer wrote: “When Jack Blott, Michigan’s star center, fell on a loose ball, in back of the goal line in the recent Michigan-Iowa game, he performed a feat which is rarely accomplished on the gridiron. Not only did it win the contest for the Wolverines, but it marked one of the few times wherein a center is credited with having scored a touchdown. ... Blott’s performance was all the more unique [sic] in that he passed the ball for Kipke’s attempted drop kick and then raced down the field ahead of any of the other players in time to drop on the leather as it bounded across the final chalk mark after having grazed an Iowa uniform.”

Years later, Harry Kipke recalled the play this way: "Why was it a touchdown? Because, as the ball sailed over the scrimmage line one of the Iowa players touched it. ... Few spectators and not many of the players noticed it. But Blott did, and at least one official noticed it. That official promptly made his ruling and we had six very important points."

However, in the second to last game of the season, an away game against Wisconsin, Blott “was carried from the field with a broken ankle.” As a result, Blott was unable to play in the team's final game against Minnesota.

Blott was the only All-American selected from the 1923 team and the fourth Michigan center to be named All-American. On his selection of Blott, Walter Camp wrote: “The middle of the line position goes to Blott of Michigan, whose passing this year has been the height of perfection.”

One reporter wrote that Blott was in a class by himself at the center position and “an expert at placement goals, an almost sure thing from any angle or distance.” Another wrote that Blott “will go down into football history as one of the greatest centers ever produced at Michigan.” Despite having to replace All-American Ernie Vick, Blott’s play in 1922 and 1923 was “so good that Vick, despite his greatness, hasn’t even been missed.”

== College baseball ==
Blott also starred as the catcher for the Michigan baseball teams from 1922 to 1924. In June 1923, Blott was selected to be the captain of the baseball team for the 1924 season.

In a game against Iowa in 1924, Blott drove in three runs with a bases-loaded hit to right field, adding to his unpopularity in Iowa after his recovery of a loose ball in the end zone against Iowa in football the previous fall. On April 21, 1924, the last game of a road trip through the South, Blott hit two home runs in a game marked by intermittent snow flurries. The Wolverines beat the University of Cincinnati, 9-8, on the strength of Blott’s home runs. “The heavy hitting of Jack Blott who raised two in the stands for home runs was largely responsible for Michigan’s runs.”

== Professional baseball ==
At the end of his three years of college baseball, he was "considered by many to be the best back-stopper in the Big Ten Conference." In the spring of 1924, three major league teams made offers to Blott: the New York Yankees, the Cleveland Indians, and the St. Louis Cardinals. Miami University also tried to sign him as its football coach.

Blott received his degree from Michigan’s "literary school" on June 16, 1924, and immediately signed with the Cincinnati Reds. He chose the Reds after turning down a contract offered by former Michigan coach Branch Rickey, manager of the Cardinals. Blott reported to the Reds at the end of June 1924 “to become the understudy” of the Reds’ longtime catchers Bubbles Hargrave and Ivey Wingo.

Blott appeared in his first major league game on July 30, 1924 — just six weeks after graduation. In all, Blott appeared in only two games, the second on September 3, 1924. He had only one plate appearance and failed to get on base, for a career .000 batting average. On the other hand, he made one putout and no errors for a perfect 1.000 fielding percentage. The Reds finished the 1924 season in fourth place with an 84–69 record.

At the end of the season, Blott’s status was uncertain. While he had been “a great thrower in college,” Blott broke his shoulder blade in football and was still suffering from the injury when he reported to the Reds. Yet, at the end of the season, Reds’ manager Jack Hendricks was confident that Blott had entirely recovered and “is throwing as well as ever.”

Blott’s prospects to win a regular spot with the Reds appeared slim. One newspaper account summed it up: “Jack Blott will, as last summer, be the catching understudy with small chance of seeing much action behind the bat where Bubbles Hargrave and Ivey Wingo will hold forth.”

In an interview with syndicated columnist Billy Evans after the 1924 season, Blott asked the question: “Is it worth while for a college player to consider the professional game?” Blott frankly noted, “I’m not so sure that I am to be a star.” Evans wrote that there were many “ifs” to such a question, including love of the game and other business prospects. However, Evans noted that Blott was left with a decision as to whether to return to the Reds in 1925, realizing he would likely be “sitting on the bench as a substitute possessing just enough ability to fill in when one of the regulars was out of the lineup.” Evans opined that it was a “waste of time” for a collegian to play such a role. Evans later revealed that Blott had confided in him that he liked football best and would prefer to coach a grid team than play baseball.

In February 1925, Blott announced that he was giving up professional baseball and would not be reporting to spring training with the Reds. Instead, Fielding H. Yost announced that Blott would remain an assistant coach and teach in the four-year coaching course at Michigan. After Blott made his announcement, Billy Evans wrote in his column: “Baseball has lost another promising player. He is Jack Blott ... Blott has decided to forsake the diamond pastime to become assistant line coach at Michigan. ... While at the Ann Arbor institution Blott was a star of the first magnitude in both football and baseball. ... On the diamond, Blott also ranked high as a backstop. ... And though adorning the bench most of the time, was to have been taken down south for spring training this month. Blott, however, evidently prefers football coaching to the rather uncertainty of making good in the big leagues. ... And according to Blott, wanted to be a major leaguer or nothing. As a gridiron tutor, Blott should go big.”

In mid-March, the Reds announced they were “still plenty sore” about the course of action taken by Blott and noted that he had not returned the bonus given him when he signed. Two years earlier, the Reds had lost the services of Ray Fisher who left the team to become Michigan's baseball coach.

== Professional career ==
=== Assistant football coach at Michigan ===
Blott initially signed with Michigan on September 24, 1924, as an assistant football coach responsible for line candidates, concentrating on the center and guard positions. He served as a line coach at Michigan from 1924 through 1933, including the Wolverines' National Championship teams of 1932 and 1933. He was the line coach during the freshman, sophomore, and junior years of Michigan's most famous center, U.S. President Gerald R. Ford.

=== Head football coach at Wesleyan ===
In January 1934, rumors spread that Michigan assistants, Bennie Oosterbaan and Jack Blott, had interviewed for positions at Yale and other eastern schools. Yost expressed the hope that “his boys” would stay at Michigan, and confidence that “when all the shouting’s over Bennie Oosterbaan and Jack Blott will both be right here.” However, in February 1934, Blott accepted the head coaching job at Wesleyan University in Middletown, Connecticut. Blott was the head football coach at Wesleyan from 1934 to 1940. Blott also coached baseball at Wesleyan. During his seven years as head football coach, Wesleyan’s record was:

- 1934: 3–5–0
- 1935: 4–4–0
- 1936: 5–2–1
- 1937: 5–3–0
- 1938: 5–3–0
- 1939: 6–2–0
- 1940: 3–5–0

In 1938, following the resignation of Harry Kipke as Michigan's head football coach, there were press reports that Blott was being considered (and was Yost’s pick) for the head coaching job at Michigan, but the job went to Fritz Crisler from Princeton.

=== Ford Motor Company ===
At the end of the 1940 season, Blott announced he was retiring as head coach at Wesleyan to take a post with the Ford Motor Company in Detroit. Blott worked in Ford’s personnel department for six years from 1940 until 1945. In that capacity, he represented Ford in collective bargaining negotiations with the United Auto Workers.

=== Second stint as line coach at Michigan ===
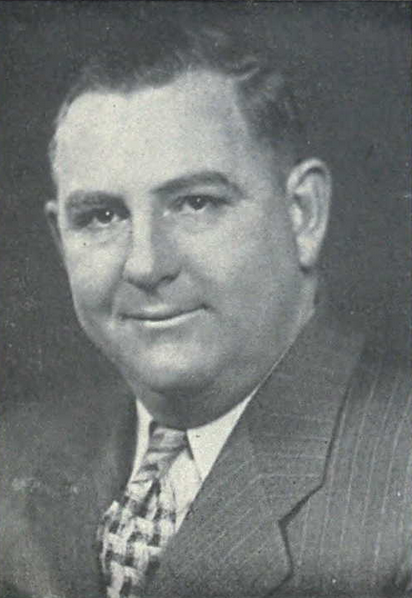
Blott from the 1948 Michiganensian

In February 1946, Blott was hired as Michigan’s line coach, this time working under Coach Fritz Crisler. He replaced Biggie Munn, who accepted the head coaching job at Syracuse. He was the line coach for the undefeated 1947 and 1948 National Championship teams.

One Blott story that was picked up by the wire services in 1949 told of a husky Michigan lineman limping to the sideline, to be asked by Blott, “What’s the matter son? Legs bothering you?” When the player replied, “Yeah, the muscles are all sore along the back here,” Blott responded: “That’s strange, I was watching you. You couldn’t have got it from charging too fast; it must be from getting up so many times after that little guard knocked you down.”

In his career as a player and coach at Michigan, Blott played on one National Championship team (1923) and was the line coach on four others (1932–1933 and 1947–1948). As a coach, he helped develop some of the school's all-time great linemen, including Chuck Bernard, Gerald R. Ford, Otto Pommerening, Alvin Wistert, and Robert "Brick" Wahl.

In December 1958, Michigan replaced head coach Bennie Oosterbaan with Bump Elliott and also replaced Blott as line coach. It was announced at the time that Blott would be kept on as “overseer of Michigan’s intramural program.”

=== Manager of the U-M golf course and ice rink ===
After 1958, Blott managed the U-M golf course and ice rink. In June 1964, Blott died of a heart attack while mowing the lawn of his Ann Arbor home. He was survived by his widow, Helen, and his daughter, Joanne.

== Personal life ==
In 1987, Blott was posthumously inducted into the University of Michigan Hall of Honor for baseball, football and coaching.

As a student the University of Michigan, Blott became a member of the Lambda Chi Alpha fraternity.

== See also ==
- 1923 Michigan Wolverines football team
- List of Michigan Wolverines football All-Americans
- University of Michigan Athletic Hall of Honor
