= College Football Researchers Association =

Selector of college football champions

The College Football Researchers Association (CFRA) was founded in 1982 by Anthony Cusher of Reeder, North Dakota, and Robert Kirlin of Spokane, Washington. The CFRA took a vote of its members from 1982 to 1992 to select an annual college football national champion. Members were asked to rank the top 10 teams, and a point system was used to determine a national champion based on the members' votes. The CFRA also conducted a retroactive poll to determine historical national champions for each year from 1919 to 1981. The CFRA is listed by the National Collegiate Athletic Association (NCAA) as one of 40 former and current selectors of college football national champions, and the CFRA selections are included in the NCAA's Football Bowl Subdivision record book.

In the fall of 2009, under the coordination of Brad Matthews of Wilmington, North Carolina, and with the involvement of past members, the College Football Researchers Association was reorganized, and a group of both new and original CFRA voters was assembled to recreate this poll. The CFRA then retroactively crowned champions from 1993 to 2008, thus covering the period of time when the CFRA was dormant and did not recognize a national champion. According to NCAA records, the College Football Researchers Association has elected more national champions than any other multi-voter poll in the country.

In its current form, the College Football Researchers Association releases four rankings each year, rather than on a weekly basis like more traditional polls: a preseason ranking, a mid-season ranking, an end of regular season ranking, and a final postseason ranking. The CFRA also recognizes one player annually as the CFRA Player of the Year. This player is recognized based on votes submitted by each member of the CFRA. Starting in 2025 the CFRA has selected its own All-America Team.

== CFRA national champions ==
The following list identifies the college football national champions as selected by the College Football Researchers Association.

1869- Princeton

1870- Princeton

1871- no college games

1872- Princeton

1873- Princeton

1874- Yale

1875- Princeton

1876- Yale

1877- Yale

1878- Princeton

1879- Princeton

1880- Yale

1881- Yale

1882- Yale

1883- Yale

1884- Yale

1885- Princeton

1886- Yale

1887- Yale

1888- Yale

1889- Princeton

1890- Harvard

1891- Yale

1892- Yale

1893- Princeton

1894- Yale

1895- Penn

1896- Princeton

1897- Penn

1898- Harvard

1899- Princeton

1900- Yale

1901- Harvard

1902- Michigan

1903- Princeton

1904- Penn

1905- Chicago

1906- Princeton

1907- Yale

1908- Penn

1909- Yale

1910- Harvard

1911- Princeton

1912- Harvard

1913- Harvard

1914- Army

1915- Cornell

1916- Pittsburgh

1917- Georgia Tech

1918- Pittsburgh

1919- Harvard/Illinois (tie)

1920- California

1921- California

1922- Princeton

1923- Illinois

1924- Notre Dame

1925- Alabama

1926- Alabama

1927- Yale

1928- Georgia Tech

1929- Notre Dame

1930- Alabama

1931- Southern California

1932- Southern California

1933- Michigan

1934- Minnesota

1935- Minnesota

1936- Pittsburgh

1937- Pittsburgh

1938- Tennessee

1939- Texas A & M

1940- Minnesota

1941- Minnesota

1942- Ohio State

1943- Notre Dame

1944- Army

1945- Army

1946- Army

1947- Michigan

1948- Michigan

1949- Oklahoma

1950- Tennessee

1951- Maryland

1952- Michigan State

1953- Oklahoma

1954- Ohio State

1955- Oklahoma

1956- Iowa

1957- Auburn

1958- LSU

1959- Syracuse

1960- Ole Miss

1961- Alabama

1962- Southern California

1963- Texas

1964- Arkansas

1965- Alabama

1966- Michigan State

1967- Southern California

1968- Ohio State

1969- Texas

1970- Nebraska

1971- Nebraska

1972- Southern California

1973- Oklahoma

1974- Oklahoma

1975- Oklahoma

1976- Southern California

1977- Notre Dame/Alabama (tie)

1978- Alabama

1979- Southern California

1980- Pittsburgh

1981- Clemson

1982- Penn State

1983- Auburn

1984- Brigham Young

1985- Oklahoma

1986- Oklahoma

1987- Miami (FL)

1988- Notre Dame

1989- Miami (FL)

1990- Colorado

1991- Miami (FL)

1992- Alabama

1993- Florida State

1994- Nebraska

1995- Nebraska

1996- Florida

1997- Michigan

1998- Tennessee

1999- Florida State

2000- Oklahoma

2001- Miami (FL)

2002- Ohio State

2003- LSU

2004- Southern California

2005- Texas

2006- Florida

2007- LSU

2008- Florida

2009- Alabama

2010- Auburn

2011- Alabama

2012- Alabama

2013- Florida State

2014- Ohio State

2015- Alabama

2016- Clemson

2017- Alabama

2018- Clemson

2019- LSU

2020- Alabama

2021-Georgia

2022-Georgia

2023- Michigan

2024- Ohio State

2025- Indiana

== NCAA major selections ==
The CFRA selections below are listed in the official NCAA Football Bowl Subdivision Records book of "major selectors" of national championships. The criterion for the NCAA's designation is that the poll or selector be "national in scope, either through distribution in newspaper, television, radio and/or computer online".

Season	Champion
1919	Harvard; Illinois
1920	California
1921	California
1922	Princeton
1923	Illinois
1924	Notre Dame
1925	Alabama
1926	Alabama
1927	Yale
1928	Georgia Tech
1929	Notre Dame
1930	Alabama
1931	USC
1932	USC
1933	Michigan
1934	Minnesota
1935	Minnesota
1936	Pittsburgh
1937	Pittsburgh
1938	Tennessee
1939	Texas A&M
1940	Minnesota
1941	Minnesota
1942	Ohio State
1943	Notre Dame
1944	Army
1945	Army
1946	Army
1947	Michigan
1948	Michigan
1949	Oklahoma
1950	Tennessee
1951	Maryland
1952	Michigan State
1953	Oklahoma
1954	UCLA
1955	Oklahoma
1956	Iowa
1957	Auburn
1958	LSU
1959	Syracuse
1960	Ole Miss
1961	Alabama
1962	Southern Cal
1963	Texas
1964	Arkansas
1965	Alabama
1966	Michigan State
1967	Southern Cal
1968	Ohio State
1969	Texas
1970	Nebraska
1971	Nebraska
1972	Southern Cal
1973	Oklahoma
1974	Oklahoma
1975	Oklahoma
1976	Southern Cal
1977	Notre Dame
1978	Alabama
1979	Alabama
1980	Pittsburgh
1981	Clemson
1982	Penn State
1983	Auburn
1984	Brigham Young
1985	Oklahoma
1986	Oklahoma
1987	Miami (FL)
1988	Notre Dame
1989	Miami (FL)
1990	Colorado
1991	Miami (FL)
1992	Alabama
2009	Alabama
2010	Auburn
2011	Alabama
2012	Alabama
2013	Florida State
2014	Ohio State
2015	Alabama
2016	Clemson
2017	Alabama
2018	Clemson

== CFRA Player of The Year Award Recipients ==
2012-Johnny Manziel, Texas A&M

2013- Jameis Winston, Florida State

2014- Marcus Mariota, Oregon

2015 - Derrick Henry, Alabama

2016- Deshaun Watson, Clemson

2017- Baker Mayfield, Oklahoma

2018- Tua Tagovailoa, Alabama

2019-Joe Burrow, LSU

2020- DeVonta Smith, Alabama

2021- Bryce Young, Alabama

2022- Caleb Williams, Southern California

2023- Michael Penix, Jr., Washington

2024- Ashton Jeanty, Boise State

2025 - Diego Pavia, Vanderbilt

- College football national championships in NCAA Division I FBS
