= Stanley Muirhead =

American football player (1902–1942)

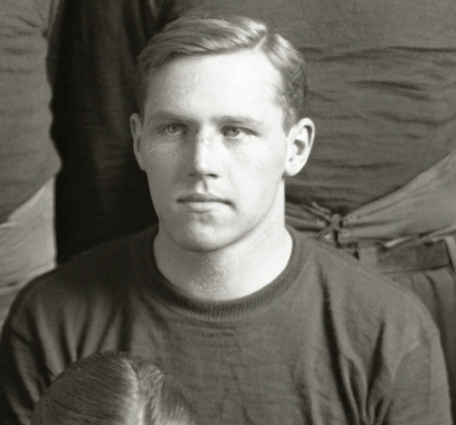

Profile
- Positions: Tackle, guard

Personal information
- Born: August 29, 1902; Calumet, Michigan, U.S.
- Died: September 14, 1942 (aged 40)

Career information
- College: Michigan

Career history
- 1924: Dayton Triangles
- 1924: Cleveland Bulldogs

Awards and highlights
- National champion (1923); 2× First-team All-Big Ten (1922, 1923)

Stanley Nelson Muirhead (August 29, 1902 – September 14, 1942) was an American football player. He played at the tackle position for the University of Michigan from 1921 to 1923, leading the Wolverines to consecutive undefeated seasons in 1922 and 1923 and a national championship in 1923. He was selected as a second-team All-American in both 1922 and 1923. Muirhead also played professional football in 1924 for the Dayton Triangles and Cleveland Bulldogs and was selected as a first-team All-NFL player.

== Biography ==
Muirhead was a native of Calumet in Michigan's Upper Peninsula but attended Northern High School in Detroit. He played tackle and guard for the Michigan Wolverines football team from 1921 to 1923. After the 1921 season, Detroit News sports editor H.G. Salsinger wrote: "Muirhead, of Michigan, playing his first college season, was one of the outstanding tackles in a year when the position produced a number of spectacular stars. Muirhead improved with each game, and his rapid development means that next season it will require a great tackle to keep him from being a first choice."

As a junior and senior, Muirhead helped lead Michigan to consecutive undefeated seasons and a national championship in 1923. In 1923, an NEA News Service profile on the stars of the Michigan football team noted: "Muirhead's tackling has been as good as the middle west section has seen in some time. Time and again he has beaten the ends down under punts and nailed the receiver in his tracks. On offense his work has likewise been of high class." Muirhead played his final game in a Michigan uniform against the University of Minnesota in November 1923, and a newspaper account described his performance in that game as follows:

In his last game against Minnesota, November 24, Muirhead was everywhere, he made three-fourths of the tackles under punts, and was always on the ball. A check was made during the game of Muirheads's tackles. No less than twenty-two times did this stalwart tackle bring down his man. He was a veritable demon on the field, who could not be stopped. If there is a greater tackle in the country than Stan Muirhead of Michigan he has not yet been seen.

Muirhead also developed a reputation for his durability. He played in every conference game for Michigan from 1921 to 1923, leading one sports columnist to write:

Stanley Muirhead, former University of Michigan tackle, saw three seasons' work on the Yost elevens, taking part in every conference game played during that stretch and was out of the lineup for only two minutes all told. Feats like these are rare. College football is too tough a game for a player to escape the injury bugaboo entirely.

In 1922, Muirhead was selected as a second-team All-American by sports writer Lawrence Perry. After the 1923 season, Muirhead was selected as a first-team All-Big Ten Conference player and a second-team All-American by Athletic World magazine, based on votes cast by 500 coaches, Lawrence Perry, and Central Press Association sports editor Norman E. Brown.

After graduating from Michigan in 1924, Muirhead played professional football for the Dayton Triangles and Cleveland Bulldogs in the fall of 1924. He was also selected as a first-team All-NFL player in 1924 by Collyers Eye magazine.

== See also ==
- 1922 College Football All-America Team
- 1923 College Football All-America Team
