= 1920–21 NCAA men's basketball season =

Men's collegiate basketball season

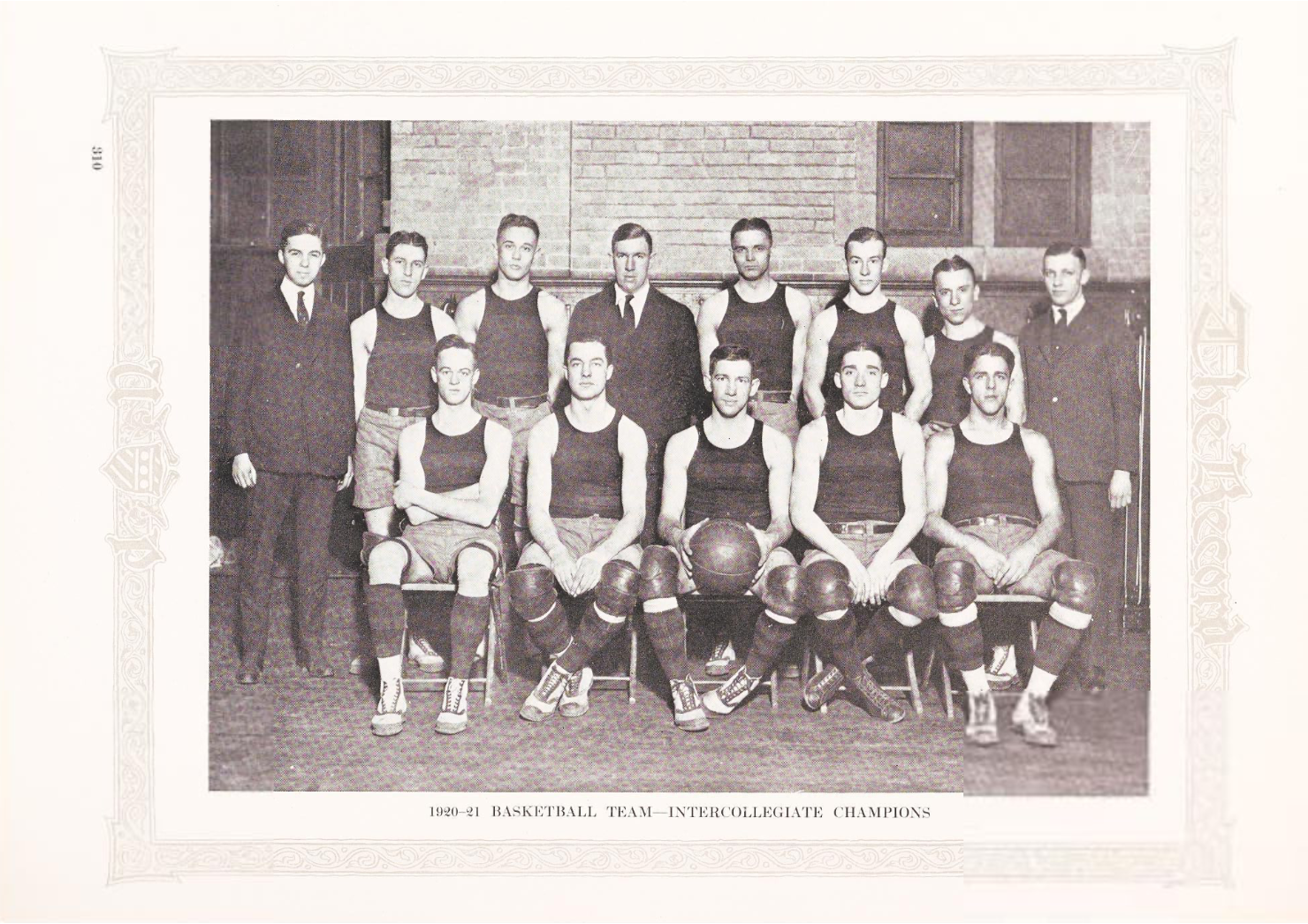
- Penn Quakers — Intercollegiate Champions
- Helms National Champions: Penn (retroactive selection in 1943)
- Player of the Year (Helms): George Williams, Missouri (retroactive selection in 1944)

The 1920–21 NCAA men's basketball season began in December 1920, progressed through the regular season and conference tournaments, and concluded in March 1921.

== Rule changes ==
- The basket was moved to 2 feet (0.6 m) from the baseline and the padded wall behind the basket was ruled out of bounds. Previously, players could climb the wall to get closer to the basket for a shot.
- A new substitution rule allowed a player who left the game to re-enter it once. Previously, a player who left the game could not re-enter it.

== Season headlines ==
- The Southern Intercollegiate Athletic Conference played the first college conference championship tournament. Kentucky won.
- In February 1943, the Helms Athletic Foundation retroactively selected Penn as its national champion for the 1920–21 season.
- In 1995, the Premo-Porretta Power Poll retroactively selected Missouri as its top-ranked team for the 1920–21 season.

== Conference membership changes ==
| School | Former conference | New conference |
|---|---|---|
| Nebraska Cornhuskers | Independent | Missouri Valley Intercollegiate Athletic Association |
| Phillips Haymakers | Southwest Conference | No major basketball program |

== Regular season ==
=== Conferences ===
==== Conference winners and tournaments ====
| Conference | Regular season winner | Conference player of the year | Conference tournament | Tournament venue (City) | Tournament winner |
|---|---|---|---|---|---|
| Big Ten Conference | Michigan, Purdue & Wisconsin | None selected | No Tournament | | |
| Eastern Intercollegiate Basketball League | Penn | None selected | No Tournament | | |
| Missouri Valley Intercollegiate Athletic Association | Missouri | None selected | No Tournament | | |
| Pacific Coast Conference | Stanford | | No Tournament | | |
| Rocky Mountain Athletic Conference | Colorado | | No Tournament | | |
| Southern Intercollegiate Athletic Association | none (see note) | None selected | 1921 Southern Intercollegiate Athletic Association men's basketball tournament | Municipal Auditorium (Atlanta, Georgia) | Kentucky |
| Southwest Conference | Texas A&M | None selected | No Tournament | | |

NOTE: The Southern Intercollegiate Athletic Association did not have an official regular-season champion, but it sponsored the 1921 Southern Intercollegiate Athletic Association men's basketball tournament, whose champion claimed the mythical title of "Champions of the South."

==== Conference standings ====
1920–21 Big Ten Conference men's basketball standings
| | Conf. | | | | Overall |
| Team | W | | L | PCT | W | | L | PCT |
|---|---|---|---|---|---|---|---|---|
| Michigan | 8 | – | 4 | .667 | 18 | – | 4 | .818 |
| Wisconsin | 8 | – | 4 | .667 | 13 | – | 4 | .765 |
| Purdue | 8 | – | 4 | .667 | 13 | – | 7 | .650 |
| Minnesota | 7 | – | 5 | .583 | 10 | – | 5 | .667 |
| Illinois | 7 | – | 5 | .583 | 11 | – | 7 | .611 |
| Indiana | 6 | – | 5 | .545 | 15 | – | 6 | .714 |
| Iowa | 6 | – | 5 | .545 | 9 | – | 9 | .500 |
| Chicago | 6 | – | 6 | .500 | 14 | – | 6 | .700 |
| Ohio State | 2 | – | 10 | .167 | 4 | – | 13 | .235 |
| Northwestern | 1 | – | 11 | .083 | 2 | – | 12 | .143 |

1920–21 Pacific Coast Conference men's basketball standings
| | Conf. | | | | Overall |
| Team | W | | L | PCT | W | | L | PCT |
|---|---|---|---|---|---|---|---|---|
| Stanford | 8 | – | 3 | .727 | 15 | – | 3 | .833 |
| California | 8 | – | 3 | .727 | 15 | – | 4 | .789 |
| Washington | 10 | – | 4 | .714 | 18 | – | 4 | .818 |
| Oregon | 8 | – | 4 | .667 | 15 | – | 5 | .750 |
| Washington State | 3 | – | 11 | .214 | 12 | – | 16 | .429 |
| Oregon Agricultural | 2 | – | 14 | .125 | 6 | – | 17 | .261 |
As of 1921

1920–21 Eastern Intercollegiate Basketball League standings
| | Conf. | | | | Overall |
| Team | W | | L | PCT | W | | L | PCT |
|---|---|---|---|---|---|---|---|---|
| Penn | 9 | – | 1 | .900 | 21 | – | 2 | .913 |
| Dartmouth | 7 | – | 3 | .700 | 13 | – | 9 | .591 |
| Cornell | 6 | – | 4 | .600 | 12 | – | 10 | .545 |
| Princeton | 4 | – | 6 | .400 | 14 | – | 9 | .609 |
| Columbia | 3 | – | 7 | .300 | 7 | – | 9 | .438 |
| Yale | 1 | – | 9 | .100 | 9 | – | 17 | .346 |

1920–21 Rocky Mountain Conference standings
| | Conf. | | | | Overall |
| Team | W | | L | PCT | W | | L | PCT |
|---|---|---|---|---|---|---|---|---|
| Colorado | 6 | – | 0 | 1.000 | 8 | – | 0 | 1.000 |
| Colorado College | 3 | – | 2 | .600 | 7 | – | 4 | .636 |
| Colorado Agricultural | 2 | – | 4 | .333 | 2 | – | 7 | .222 |
| Denver | 0 | – | 5 | .000 | 2 | – | 8 | .200 |
| Colorado Mines | | – | | – | 5 | – | 2 | .714 |

1920–21 Missouri Valley Intercollegiate Athletic Association men's basketball standings
| | Conf. | | | | Overall |
| Team | W | | L | PCT | W | | L | PCT |
|---|---|---|---|---|---|---|---|---|
| Missouri | 17 | – | 1 | .944 | 17 | – | 1 | .944 |
| Nebraska | 9 | – | 1 | .900 | 15 | – | 3 | .833 |
| Kansas State | 11 | – | 4 | .733 | 14 | – | 5 | .737 |
| Kansas | 10 | – | 8 | .556 | 10 | – | 8 | .556 |
| Iowa State | 6 | – | 8 | .429 | 10 | – | 8 | .556 |
| Oklahoma | 5 | – | 9 | .357 | 10 | – | 8 | .556 |
| Drake | 5 | – | 8 | .385 | 10 | – | 8 | .556 |
| Grinnell | 2 | – | 12 | .143 | 6 | – | 12 | .333 |
| Washington University | 2 | – | 16 | .111 | 3 | – | 17 | .150 |

1920–21 Southwest Conference men's basketball standings
| | Conf. | | | | Overall |
| Team | W | | L | PCT | W | | L | PCT |
|---|---|---|---|---|---|---|---|---|
| Texas A&M | 10 | – | 2 | .833 | 16 | – | 6 | .727 |
| Baylor | 8 | – | 4 | .667 | 13 | – | 11 | .542 |
| Texas | 9 | – | 5 | .643 | 13 | – | 5 | .722 |
| Rice | 4 | – | 9 | .308 | 5 | – | 10 | .333 |
| SMU | 0 | – | 11 | .000 | 6 | – | 13 | .316 |

=== Independents ===
A total of 120 college teams played as major independents. Among independents that played at least 10 games, St. John's of Ohio (15–0) was undefeated, and Central Missouri (22–2), Oberlin (22–2), and Wabash (22–4) finished with the most wins.

1920–21 NCAA men's basketball independents standings
| | Conf. | | | | Overall |
| Team | W | | L | PCT | W | | L | PCT |
|---|---|---|---|---|---|---|---|---|
| Arizona | | – | | – | 7 | – | 0 | 1.000 |
| Holy Cross | | – | | – | 2 | – | 0 | 1.000 |
| St. John's (Ohio) | | – | | – | 15 | – | 0 | 1.000 |
| Navy | | – | | – | 18 | – | 1 | .947 |
| Grove City | | – | | – | 16 | – | 1 | .941 |
| North Dakota | | – | | – | 14 | – | 1 | .933 |
| New York University | | – | | – | 12 | – | 1 | .923 |
| Central Missouri | | – | | – | 22 | – | 2 | .917 |
| Oberlin | | – | | – | 22 | – | 2 | .917 |
| VMI | | – | | – | 11 | – | 1 | .917 |
| New Mexico A&M | | – | | – | 9 | – | 1 | .900 |
| Tulsa | | – | | – | 18 | – | 2 | .900 |
| Fairmount | | – | | – | 16 | – | 2 | .889 |
| Gettysburg | | – | | – | 7 | – | 1 | .875 |
| Penn State | | – | | – | 14 | – | 2 | .875 |
| Akron | | – | | – | 11 | – | 2 | .846 |
| Wabash | | – | | – | 22 | – | 4 | .846 |
| Brigham Young | | – | | – | 10 | – | 2 | .833 |
| DePauw | | – | | – | 15 | – | 3 | .833 |
| Utah | | – | | – | 5 | – | 1 | .833 |
| Louisiana State | | – | | – | 19 | – | 4 | .826 |
| Marquette | | – | | – | 14 | – | 3 | .824 |
| Ohio | | – | | – | 14 | – | 3 | .824 |
| Saint Francis (N.Y.) | | – | | – | 14 | – | 3 | .824 |
| Butler | | – | | – | 16 | – | 4 | .800 |
| Denison | | – | | – | 12 | – | 3 | .800 |
| UCLA | | – | | – | 8 | – | 2 | .800 |
| West Texas State | | – | | – | 8 | – | 2 | .800 |
| Valparaiso | | – | | – | 19 | – | 5 | .792 |
| Virginia Tech | | – | | – | 19 | – | 5 | .792 |
| Idaho | | – | | – | 15 | – | 4 | .789 |
| Niagara | | – | | – | 15 | – | 4 | .789 |
| North Dakota Agricultural | | – | | – | 15 | – | 4 | .789 |
| Tempe Normal | | – | | – | 11 | – | 3 | .786 |
| Army | | – | | – | 18 | – | 5 | .783 |
| Nevada | | – | | – | 10 | – | 3 | .769 |
| Carleton | | – | | – | 13 | – | 4 | .765 |
| Seton Hall | | – | | – | 13 | – | 4 | .765 |
| Bucknell | | – | | – | 12 | – | 4 | .750 |
| Millikin | | – | | – | 18 | – | 6 | .750 |
| Ripon | | – | | – | 9 | – | 3 | .750 |
| CCNY | | – | | – | 11 | – | 4 | .733 |
| Lafayette | | – | | – | 11 | – | 4 | .733 |
| Southwestern (Kan.) | | – | | – | 19 | – | 7 | .731 |
| Colgate | | – | | – | 16 | – | 6 | .727 |
| The Citadel | | – | | – | 8 | – | 3 | .727 |
| William & Mary | | – | | – | 8 | – | 3 | .727 |
| Virginia | | – | | – | 13 | – | 5 | .722 |
| Georgetown | | – | | – | 10 | – | 4 | .714 |
| Southern California | | – | | – | 10 | – | 4 | .714 |
| Western State Normal | | – | | – | 12 | – | 5 | .706 |
| Washington and Lee | | – | | – | 9 | – | 4 | .692 |
| Creighton | | – | | – | 13 | – | 6 | .684 |
| Indiana State | | – | | – | 15 | – | 7 | .682 |
| Boston University | | – | | – | 2 | – | 1 | .667 |
| Buffalo | | – | | – | 12 | – | 6 | .667 |
| Kalamazoo | | – | | – | 18 | – | 9 | .667 |
| Northern Colorado | | – | | – | 6 | – | 3 | .667 |
| Saint Louis | | – | | – | 12 | – | 6 | .667 |
| Vermont | | – | | – | 10 | – | 5 | .667 |
| Loyola (Ill.) | | – | | – | 7 | – | 4 | .636 |
| Temple | | – | | – | 7 | – | 4 | .636 |
| Fordham | | – | | – | 15 | – | 9 | .625 |
| Michigan State Normal | | – | | – | 13 | – | 8 | .619 |
| Montana State | | – | | – | 8 | – | 5 | .615 |
| Wooster | | – | | – | 8 | – | 5 | .615 |
| Mount Union | | – | | – | 11 | – | 7 | .611 |
| Trinity (N.C.) | | – | | – | 9 | – | 6 | .600 |
| Miami (Ohio) | | – | | – | 9 | – | 6 | .600 |
| Montana | | – | | – | 12 | – | 8 | .600 |
| North Carolina | | – | | – | 12 | – | 8 | .600 |
| Utah State | | – | | – | 6 | – | 4 | .600 |
| Duquesne | | – | | – | 10 | – | 7 | .588 |
| Rutgers | | – | | – | 7 | – | 5 | .583 |
| Pittsburgh | | – | | – | 12 | – | 9 | .571 |
| Syracuse | | – | | – | 12 | – | 9 | .571 |
| Ole Miss | | – | | – | 9 | – | 7 | .563 |
| Northern Arizona Normal | | – | | – | 9 | – | 7 | .563 |
| Muhlenberg | | – | | – | 14 | – | 11 | .560 |
| Canisius | | – | | – | 5 | – | 4 | .556 |
| Detroit | | – | | – | 10 | – | 8 | .556 |
| Springfield (Mass.) | | – | | – | 10 | – | 8 | .556 |
| West Virginia | | – | | – | 11 | – | 9 | .550 |
| Alabama | | – | | – | 12 | – | 10 | .545 |
| Bowling Green State | | – | | – | 8 | – | 7 | .533 |
| Villanova | | – | | – | 8 | – | 7 | .533 |
| Rhode Island State | | – | | – | 9 | – | 8 | .529 |
| Washburn | | – | | – | 9 | – | 8 | .529 |
| St. John's (N.Y.) | | – | | – | 10 | – | 9 | .526 |
| Union (N.Y.) | | – | | – | 10 | – | 9 | .526 |
| Davidson | | – | | – | 7 | – | 7 | .500 |
| Washington College | | – | | – | 6 | – | 6 | .500 |
| Cincinnati | | – | | – | 10 | – | 11 | .476 |
| Harvard | | – | | – | 9 | – | 10 | .474 |
| Florida | | – | | – | 5 | – | 6 | .455 |
| Bradley | | – | | – | 7 | – | 9 | .438 |
| Connecticut | | – | | – | 7 | – | 9 | .438 |
| Franklin | | – | | – | 6 | – | 8 | .429 |
| Lehigh | | – | | – | 6 | – | 8 | .429 |
| Wyoming | | – | | – | 3 | – | 4 | .429 |
| Wake Forest | | – | | – | 7 | – | 10 | .412 |
| Marshall | | – | | – | 6 | – | 9 | .400 |
| Notre Dame | | – | | – | 9 | – | 14 | .391 |
| Vanderbilt | | – | | – | 8 | – | 13 | .381 |
| Kent State Normal | | – | | – | 4 | – | 7 | .364 |
| Brown | | – | | – | 5 | – | 9 | .357 |
| North Carolina State | | – | | – | 6 | – | 14 | .300 |
| Xavier | | – | | – | 3 | – | 7 | .300 |
| George Washington | | – | | – | 4 | – | 10 | .286 |
| St. Joseph's | | – | | – | 4 | – | 10 | .286 |
| Santa Clara | | – | | – | 2 | – | 5 | .286 |
| Dayton | | – | | – | 6 | – | 16 | .273 |
| Louisville | | – | | – | 3 | – | 8 | .273 |
| Richmond | | – | | – | 4 | – | 13 | .235 |
| Oklahoma A&M | | – | | – | 2 | – | 9 | .182 |
| St. Bonaventure | | – | | – | 2 | – | 13 | .133 |
| Toledo | | – | | – | 1 | – | 12 | .077 |
| Manhattan | | – | | – | 0 | – | 6 | .000 |
| Saint Mary's (Calif.) | | – | | – | 0 | – | 2 | .000 |
| Texas Christian | | – | | – | 0 | – | 3 | .000 |

== Awards ==
=== Helms College Basketball All-Americans ===
The practice of selecting a Consensus All-American Team did not begin until the 1928–29 season. The Helms Athletic Foundation later retroactively selected a list of All-Americans for the 1920–21 season.

| Player | Team |
|---|---|
| R. D. Birkhoff | Chicago |
| Herb Bunker | Missouri |
| Everett Dean | Indiana |
| Forrest DeBernardi | Westminster (Mo.) |
| Edwin Durno | Oregon |
| Basil Hayden | Kentucky |
| Dan McNichol | Pennsylvania |
| Arnold Oss | Minnesota |
| Donald White | Purdue |
| George Williams | Missouri |

=== Major player of the year awards ===
- Helms Player of the Year: George Williams, Missouri (retroactive selection in 1944)

== Coaching changes ==
A number of teams changed coaches during the season and after it ended.

| Team | Former Coach | Interim Coach | New Coach | Reason |
|---|---|---|---|---|
| Arizona | Pop McKale | | James Pierce | McKale stepped down as basketball coach, but continued to be the athletic director and football coach. |
| Army | Joseph O'Shea | | Harry A. Fisher | |
| Bowling Green State | Fred Beyerman | | Eal Krieger | |
| Brown | Florence Harvey | | Walter Snell | |
| Canisius | Mike Sweeney | | Luke Urban | |
| Connecticut | Ross Swartz | | J. Wilder Tasker | |
| Creighton | Eddie Mulholland | | Charles Kearney | |
| Dayton | Dutch Thiele | | William Sherry | |
| Denver | Thomas Thompson | | Ralph Woods | |
| Drake | M. B. Banks | | Ossie Solem | |
| Duquesne | Ben Lubic | | Eugene McGuigan | |
| Fairmount | Wilmer D. Elfrink | | Lamar Hoover | |
| Fordham | Orson Kinney | | Eli Butler | |
| Georgetown | John O'Reilly | | James Colliflower | After the conclusion of the 1920–21 season, O'Reilly suffered health problems that forced him to miss the next two seasons. For the 1921–22 season, Colliflower returned for a second stint as head coach, without pay. |
| Iowa State | Maury Kent | | Bill Chandler | |
| Kansas State | E. A. Knoth | | E. C. Curtis | |
| Lehigh | J. Murphy | | Ray Fisher | |
| Louisiana State | Branch Bocock | | Tad Gormley | |
| Louisville | Jimmie Powers | | John O'Rourke | |
| Loyola (Ill.) | Bill Feeney | | Harry Rhode | |
| Marshall | Skeeter Shelton | | Herbert Cramer | |
| North Carolina State | Richard Crozier | | Harry Hartsell | |
| Nebraska | Paul J. Schissler | | Owen A. Frank | |
| Northern Arizona Normal | Lacey Eastburn | | R. H. Drake | |
| Northwestern | Ray Elder | | Dana Evans | Evans also became athletic director. |
| Oklahoma | Bennie Owen | | Hugh McDermott | |
| Oklahoma A&M | Jim Pixlee | | John Maulbetsch | |
| Pittsburgh | George Flint | | Andrew Kerr | |
| Princeton | Lou Sugarman | James Hynson | Hill Zahn | |
| Rice | Pete Cawthon | | Howard Yerges Sr. | |
| Saint Louis | Armin Fischer | | Stephen G. O-Rourke | |
| Saint Mary's (Calif.) | H. C. McDonald | | Slip Madigan | |
| Santa Clara | Robert E. Harmon | | Joe Aurrecoechea | |
| SMU | J. Burton Rix | | R. N. Blackwell | |
| Southern California | Gus Henderson | | Willis O. Hunter | |
| St. John's (N. Y.) | John Crenny | | Ed Kelleher | |
| Stanford | Walter D. Powell | | Eugene Van Gent | |
| Toledo | Darrell Fox | | Claude H. Watts | |
| Trinity (N. C.) | Floyd J. Egan | | James A. Baldwin | |
| UCLA | Fred Cozens | | Caddy Works | |
| Vanderbilt | Guy T. Denton | | Wallace Wade | |
| Vermont | P. A. Larned | | Tpm Keady | |
| Wake Forest | James L. White | | Bill Holding | |
| Yale | Albert Sharpe | | Orson Kinney | |
