= List of Loyola Ramblers men's basketball seasons =

This is a list of seasons completed by the Loyola Ramblers men's college basketball team.

== Seasons ==
Record table
Season	Coach	Overall	Conference	Standing	Postseason
Unknown (Independent) (1913–1915)
1913–14	Unknown	0–2	–		
1914–15	Unknown	8–3	–		
Unknown:		8–5 (.615)			
Percy Moore (Independent) (1915–1916)
1915–16	Percy Moore	10–3	–		
Percy Moore:		10–3 (.769)			
Unknown (Independent) (1916–1917)
1916–17	Unknown	1–3	–		
Unknown:		1–3 (.250)			
Bill Feeney (Independent) (1920–1921)
1920–21	Bill Feeney	7–4	–		
Bill Feeney:		7–4 (.636)			
Harry Rhodes (Independent) (1921–1922)
1921–22	Harry Rhodes	0–6	–		
Harry Rhodes:		0–6 (.000)			
Jack Tierney (Independent) (1922–1923)
1922–23	Jack Tierney	5–7	–		
Jack Tierney:		5–7 (.417)			
Lenny Sachs (Independent) (1923–1942)
1923–24	Lenny Sachs	8–11	–		
1924–25	Lenny Sachs	4–11	–		
1925–26	Lenny Sachs	13–8	–		
1926–27	Lenny Sachs	13–4	–		
1927–28	Lenny Sachs	16–4	–		
1928–29	Lenny Sachs	16–0	–		
1929–30	Lenny Sachs	13–5	–		
1930–31	Lenny Sachs	8–7	–		
1931–32	Lenny Sachs	15–2	–		
1932–33	Lenny Sachs	14–7	–		
1933–34	Lenny Sachs	7–8	–		
1934–35	Lenny Sachs	5–14	–		
1935–36	Lenny Sachs	8–8	–		
1936–37	Lenny Sachs	16–3	–		
1937–38	Lenny Sachs	12–8	–		
1938–39	Lenny Sachs	21–1	–		NIT Runner-up
1939–40	Lenny Sachs	5–14	–		
1940–41	Lenny Sachs	13–8	–		
1941–42	Lenny Sachs	17–6	–		
Lenny Sachs:		224–129 (.635)			
John Connelly (Independent) (1942–1943)
1942–43	John Connelly	12–10	–		
John Connelly:		12–10 (.545)			
Tom Haggerty (Independent) (1945–1950)
1945–46	Tom Haggerty	23–4	–		
1946–47	Tom Haggerty	20–9	–		
1947–48	Tom Haggerty	26–9	–		
1948–49	Tom Haggerty	25–6	–		NIT Runner-up
1949–50	Tom Haggerty	17–13	–		
Tom Haggerty:		111–41 (.730)			
John Jordan (Independent) (1950–1951)
1950–51	John Jordan	15–14	–		
John Jordan:		15–14 (.517)			
George Ireland (Independent) (1951–1975)
1951–52	George Ireland	17–8	–		
1952–53	George Ireland	8–15	–		
1953–54	George Ireland	8–15	–		
1954–55	George Ireland	13–11	–		
1955–56	George Ireland	10–14	–		
1956–57	George Ireland	14–10	–		
1957–58	George Ireland	16–8	–		
1958–59	George Ireland	11–13	–		
1959–60	George Ireland	10–12	–		
1960–61	George Ireland	15–8	–		
1961–62	George Ireland	23–4	–		NIT Third Place
1962–63	George Ireland	29–2	–		NCAA University Division Champion
1963–64	George Ireland	22–6	–		NCAA University Division Sweet Sixteen
1964–65	George Ireland	11–14	–		
1965–66	George Ireland	22–3	–		NCAA University Division first round
1966–67	George Ireland	14–9	–		
1967–68	George Ireland	16–9	–		NCAA University Division first round
1968–69	George Ireland	9–14	–		
1969–70	George Ireland	13–11	–		
1970–71	George Ireland	4–20	–		
1971–72	George Ireland	8–14	–		
1972–73	George Ireland	8–15	–		
1973–74	George Ireland	12–14	–		
George Ireland:		321–255 (.557)			
Jerry Lyne (Independent) (1974–1979)
1974–75	George Ireland; Jerry Lyne	8–6; 2–9	–		
1975–76	Jerry Lyne	10–16	–		
1976–77	Jerry Lyne	13–13	–		
1977–78	Jerry Lyne	16–11	–		
1978–79	Jerry Lyne	12–15	–		
Jerry Lyne (Midwestern City/Horizon League) (1979–1980)
1979–80	Jerry Lyne	19–10	5–0	1st	NIT first round
Jerry Lyne:		72–74 (.493)	5–0 (1.000)		
Gene Sullivan (Horizon League) (1980–1989)
1980–81	Gene Sullivan	13–15	7–4	T–2nd	
1981–82	Gene Sullivan	17–12	8–4	T–2nd	
1982–83	Gene Sullivan	19–10	12–2	1st	
1983–84	Gene Sullivan	20–9	10–4	2nd	
1984–85	Gene Sullivan	27–6	13–1	1st	NCAA Division I Sweet Sixteen
1985–86	Gene Sullivan	13–16	7–5	T–3rd	
1986–87	Gene Sullivan	16–13	8–4	T–1st	
1987–88	Gene Sullivan	13–16	3–7	5th	
1988–89	Gene Sullivan	11–17	4–8	T–5th	
Gene Sullivan:		149–114 (.567)	72–39 (.649)		
Will Rey (Horizon League) (1989–1994)
1989–90	Will Rey	7–22	3–11	T–6th	
1990–91	Will Rey	10–19	3–11	7th	
1991–92	Will Rey	13–16	2–8	5th	
1992–93	Will Rey	7–20	3–11	T–7th	
1993–94	Will Rey	8–19	1–9	6th	
Will Rey:		45–96 (.319)	12–50 (.194)		
Ken Burmeister (Horizon League) (1994–1998)
1994–95	Ken Burmeister	5–22	2–13	11th	
1995–96	Ken Burmeister	8–19	5–11	T–6th	
1996–97	Ken Burmeister	12–15	7–9	5th	
1997–98	Ken Burmeister	15–15	6–8	T–5th	
Ken Burmeister:		40–71 (.360)	20–41 (.328)		
Larry Farmer (Horizon League) (1998–2004)
1998–99	Larry Farmer	9–18	7–7	4th	
1999-00	Larry Farmer	14–14	4–10	8th	
2000–01	Larry Farmer	7–21	2–12	8th	
2001–02	Larry Farmer	17–13	9–7	T–4th	
2002–03	Larry Farmer	15–16	9–7	T–4th	
2003–04	Larry Farmer	9–20	4–12	T–7th	
Larry Farmer:		71–102 (.410)	35–55 (.389)		
Jim Whitesell (Horizon League) (2004–2011)
2004–05	Jim Whitesell	13–17	8–8	T–4th	
2005–06	Jim Whitesell	19–11	8–8	T–3rd	
2006–07	Jim Whitesell	21–11	10–6	3rd	
2007–08	Jim Whitesell	12–19	6–12	7th	
2008–09	Jim Whitesell	14–18	6–12	8th	
2009–10	Jim Whitesell	14–16	5–13	8th	
2010–11	Jim Whitesell	16–15	7–11	8th	
Jim Whitesell:		109–107 (.505)	50–70 (.417)		
Porter Moser (Horizon League) (2011–2013)
2011–12	Porter Moser	7–23	1–17	10th	
2012–13	Porter Moser	15–16	5–11	7th	
Porter Moser (Missouri Valley Conference) (2013–2021)
2013–14	Porter Moser	10–22	4–14	10th	
2014–15	Porter Moser	24–13	8–10	6th	CBI Champion
2015–16	Porter Moser	15–17	7–11	8th	
2016–17	Porter Moser	18–14	8–10	5th	
2017–18	Porter Moser	32–6	15–3	1st	NCAA Division I Final Four
2018–19	Porter Moser	20–14	12–6	1st	NIT first round
2019–20	Porter Moser	21–11	13–5	2nd	No postseason held
2020–21	Porter Moser	26–5	16–2	1st	NCAA Division I Sweet Sixteen
Porter Moser:		167–126 (.570)	89–88 (.503)		
Drew Valentine (Missouri Valley Conference) (2021–2022)
2021–22	Drew Valentine	25–8	13–5	4th	NCAA Division I first round
Drew Valentine (Atlantic 10 Conference) (2022–present)
2022–23	Drew Valentine	10–21	4–14	15th	
2023–24	Drew Valentine	23–10	15–3	T–1st	NIT first round
2024–25	Drew Valentine	25–12	12–6	T–3rd	NIT Semifinals
2025–26	Drew Valentine	9–24	4–14	T–13th	
Drew Valentine:		92–75 (.551)	48–42 (.533)		
Total:		1459–1242 (.540)			
National champion Postseason invitational champion Conference regular season champion Conference regular season and conference tournament champion Division regular season champion Division regular season and conference tournament champion Conference tournament champion
