= 1921 NCAA Men's Basketball All-Americans =

Best NCAA men's basketball players of 1921

- Awarded for: 1920–21 NCAA men's basketball season

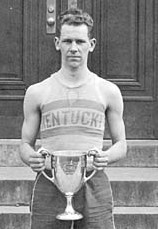
Basil Hayden was a Helms Foundation All-America selection at Kentucky.

The 1921 College Basketball All-American team, as chosen retroactively by the Helms Athletic Foundation. The player highlighted in gold was chosen as the Helms Foundation College Basketball Player of the Year retroactively in 1944.

| Player | Team |
|---|---|
| R. D. Birkhoff | Chicago |
| Herb Bunker | Missouri |
| Everett Dean | Indiana |
| Forrest DeBernardi | Westminster |
| Edwin Durno | Oregon |
| Basil Hayden | Kentucky |
| Dan McNichol | Pennsylvania |
| Arnold Oss | Minnesota |
| Donald White | Purdue |
| George Williams | Missouri |

== See also ==
- 1920–21 NCAA men's basketball season
