= 1920–21 University of Virginia men's basketball team =

American college basketball season

1920–21 University of Virginia men's basketball
- Conference: South Atlantic Intercollegiate Athletic Association
- Record: 13–5 (6–2 SAIAA)
- Head coach: Henry Lannigan (16th season)
- Home arena: Fayerweather Gymnasium

The 1920–21 University of Virginia men's basketball team represented the University of Virginia during the 1920–21 NCAA men's basketball season. The team was led by sixteenth-year head coach Henry Lannigan, and played their home games at Fayerweather Gymnasium in Charlottesville, Virginia. Now known as the Virginia Cavaliers, the team did not have an official nickname prior to 1923.

== Schedule ==
Date time, TV	Opponent	Result	Record	Site city, state
Regular season
January 15* no, no	Hampden–Sydney	W 46–10	1–0	Fayerweather Gymnasium; Charlottesville, VA
January 17* no, no	South Carolina	W 44–9	2–0	Fayerweather Gymnasium; Charlottesville, VA
January 19 no, no	Richmond	W 33–15	3–0 (1–0)	Fayerweather Gymnasium; Charlottesville, VA
January 22 no, no	William & Mary	W 46–15	4–0 (2–0)	Fayerweather Gymnasium; Charlottesville, VA
January 27* no, no	Citadel	W 51–15	5–0 (2–0)	Fayerweather Gymnasium; Charlottesville, VA
January 29* no, no	Elon	W 60–10	6–0 (2–0)	Fayerweather Gymnasium; Charlottesville, VA
February 1* no, no	North Carolina	L 26–28	6–1 (2–0)	Fayerweather Gymnasium; Charlottesville, VA
February 2 no, no	Davidson	W 47–23	7–1 (3–0)	Fayerweather Gymnasium; Charlottesville, VA
February 5* no, no	at Navy	L 17–30	7–2 (3–0)	Dahlgren Hall; Annapolis, MD
February 5 no, no	at George Washington	W 30–23	8–2 (4–0)	Washington, DC
February 10 no, no	St. John's	W 50–20	9–2 (5–0)	Fayerweather Gymnasium; Charlottesville, VA
February 16* no, no	Wake Forest	W 35–13	10–2 (5–0)	Fayerweather Gymnasium; Charlottesville, VA
February 17* no, no	Duke	W 34–15	11–2 (5–0)	Fayerweather Gymnasium; Charlottesville, VA
February 20 no, no	vs. VMI	L 15–31	11–3 (5–1)	Roanoke, VA
February 21* no, no	Delaware	W 26–22	12–3 (5–1)	Fayerweather Gymnasium; Charlottesville, VA
February 24 no, no	at Richmond	W 35–30	13–3 (6–1)	Richmond, VA
February 25* no, no	at Duke	L 22–24	13–4 (6–1)	The Ark; Durham, NC
February 26 no, no	at North Carolina	L 12–42	13–5 (6–2)	Bynum Gymnasium; Chapel Hill, NC
*Non-conference game. (#) Tournament seedings in parentheses. All times are in Eastern Time.
