= 1921 Southern Intercollegiate Athletic Association men's basketball tournament =

- Classification: Division I
- Teams: 15
- Site: Municipal Auditorium; Atlanta, Georgia
- Champions: Kentucky Wildcats (1st title)
- Winning coach: George Buchheit (1st title)
- Southern Intercollegiate Athletic Association men's basketball tournaments

The 1921 SIAA men's basketball tournament took place February 25–March 1, 1921, at Municipal Auditorium in Atlanta. The Kentucky Wildcats won their first Southern Intercollegiate Athletic Association title, led by head coach George Buchheit.

The Kentucky Wildcats defeated the pre-tournament favorite Georgia Bulldogs, on a free throw by Bill King. Georgia beat rival Georgia Tech in the semifinals.

== Bracket ==
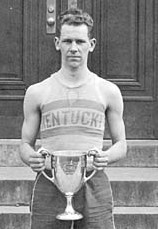
Basil Hayden holding the trophy

First round February 25
Mercer	50
South Carolina	22
Kentucky	50
Tulane	28
Furman	7
Mississippi A&M	41
Tennessee	29
Millsaps	46
Georgia	47
Newberry	23
Clemson	25
Auburn	45
Georgia Tech	53
Birmingham–Southern	11
Alabama	Bye

Quarterfinals; February 26
Mercer	25
Kentucky	49
Mississippi A&M	28
Millsaps	11
Georgia	32
Auburn	24
Georgia Tech	30
Alabama	22

Semifinals; February 28
Kentucky	28
Mississippi A&M	13
Georgia	26
Georgia Tech	21

Finals; March 1
Kentucky	20
Georgia	19

* Overtime game

=== Championship ===
March 1

Kentucky 20, Georgia 19
Pts: William King 12	Pts: Billy Anderson 11

Municipal Auditorium, Atlanta, Georgia
Attendance: 3,000
Referees: Yates and Sutton

== All-Southern Tournament Team ==
Player	Position	Class	Team
Billy Anderson	G	Senior	Georgia
Baby Roane	G	Sophomore	Georgia Tech
Bill King	F	Freshman	Kentucky
Paul Adkins	F	Senior	Kentucky
Bob Lavin	C	Junior	Kentucky

== See also ==
- List of Southern Conference men's basketball champions
