= 1920–21 Georgia Bulldogs basketball team =

Georgia Basketball Season

1920–21 Georgia Bulldogs basketball
- Conference: Southern Intercollegiate Athletic Association
- Record: 13–4 ( SIAA)
- Head coach: Herman Stegeman (2nd season)
- Captain: Buck Cheeves

The 1920–21 Georgia Bulldogs basketball team represented the University of Georgia as a member of the Southern Intercollegiate Athletic Association (SIAA) during the 1920–21 NCAA men's basketball season. Led by second-year head coach Herman Stegeman, the Bulldogs compiled an overall record of 13–4. The team captain was Kennon Mott.

== Roster ==
1920–21 Georgia Bulldogs men's basketball team
Players
Coaches

| Pos. | # | Name | Height | Weight | Year | Previous school | Hometown |
|---|---|---|---|---|---|---|---|
| | | Billy Anderson | — | — |
| | | Eddie Rawson | — | — |
| | | Paige Bennett | — | — |
| | | Buck Cheeves | — | — |
| | | J.S. Owens | — | — |
| | | Mercer Murray | — | — |
| | | Artie Pew | — | — |
| | | Jack Frost | — | — |

Head coach

Herman Stegeman

Assistant coach(es)

Legend

- (C) Team captain
- (S) Suspended
- (I) Ineligible
- (W) Walk-on
- Injured
- Current redshirt

== Schedule ==
| Date time, TV | Opponent | Result | Record | Site city, state |
|---|---|---|---|---|
| | Furman | W 69–25 | 1–0 | Athens, GA |
| 1/21/1921 | Auburn | W 31–22 | 2–0 | Athens, GA |
| 1/22/1921 | at Mercer | W 26–7 | 3–0 | Macon, GA |
| 1/28/1921 | Mercer | W 45–16 | 4–0 | Athens, GA |
| 2/4/1921 | at Macon YMCA | L 22–35 | 4–1 | |
| 2/5/1921 | Clemson | W 45–22 | 5–1 | Athens, GA |
| 2/9/1921 | at Vanderbilt | W 31–17 | 6–1 | Nashville, TN |
| 2/11/1921 | at Auburn | W 29–23 | 7–1 | Auburn, AL |
| 2/14/1921* | Camp Benning | W 20–17 | 8–1 | Athens, GA |
| 2/18/1921* | Augusta YMCA | W 74–25 | 9–1 | Athens, GA |
| 2/19/1921* | Savannah YMCA | W 55–19 | 10–1 | Athens, GA |
| 2/20/1921* | A.A.C. | L 23–33 | 10–2 | Athens, GA |
| * | at A.A.C. | L 25–37 | 10–3 | |
| | vs. Newberry; SIAA tournament first round | W 47–23 | 11–3 | Memorial Auditorium; Atlanta, GA |
| | vs. Auburn; SIAA tournament quarterfinal | W 32–24 | 12–3 | Memorial Auditorium; Atlanta, GA |
| 2/27/1921 | vs. Georgia Tech; SIAA tournament semifinal | W 26–21 | 13–3 | Memorial Auditorium; Atlanta, GA |
| 3/1/1921 | vs. Kentucky; SIAA tournament championship | L 19–20 | 13–4 | Memorial Auditorium; Atlanta, GA |
*Non-conference game. (#) Tournament seedings in parentheses.
