= 1920–21 Kentucky Wildcats men's basketball team =

Basketball team

1920–21 Kentucky Wildcats men's basketball

SIAA champion
- Conference: Southern Intercollegiate Athletic Association
- Record: 13–1 (10–1 SIAA)
- Head coach: George Buchheit (2nd season)
- Captain: Basil Hayden
- Home arena: State College Gymnasium

The 1920–21 Kentucky Wildcats men's basketball team competed on behalf of the University of Kentucky during the 1920–21 season. Basil Hayden starred for Kentucky.

== Schedule ==
1920–21 Kentucky Wildcats
Date time, TV	Opponent	Result	Record	Site (attendance) city, state
Regular season
January 12, 1921*	Kentucky Wesleyan	W 38–13	1–0	Buell Armory Gymnasium; Lexington, KY
January 15, 1921*	Cumberland	W 37–21	2–0	Buell Armory Gymnasium; Lexington, KY
January 18, 1921	Georgetown	W 38–23	3–0	Buell Armory Gymnasium; Lexington, KY
January 21, 1921	Chattanooga	W 42–10	4–0	Buell Armory Gymnasium; Lexington, KY
January 26, 1921*	at Cincinnati	W 26–19	5–0	Schmidlapp Gymnasium; Cincinnati, OH
January 29, 1921	Auburn	W 40–25	6–0	Buell Armory Gymnasium; Lexington, KY
February 8, 1921	at Centre	L 27–29	6–1	Boyle Humphrey Gymnasium; Danville, KY
February 15, 1921	at Georgetown	W 56–11	7–1	Georgetown Gymnasium; Georgetown, KY
February 18, 1921	Centre	W 20–13	8–1	Buell Armory Gymnasium; Lexington, KY
February 22, 1921	Vanderbilt	W 37–18	9–1	Buell Armory Gymnasium; Lexington, KY
SIAA tournament
February 25, 1921	Tulane; SIAA tournament first round	W 50–28	10–1	Atlanta Memorial Auditorium; Atlanta, GA
February 26, 1921	Mercer; SIAA tournament quarterfinal	W 49–25	11–1	Atlanta Memorial Auditorium; Atlanta, GA
February 28, 1921	Mississippi A&M; SIAA tournament semifinal	W 28–13	12–1	Atlanta Memorial Auditorium; Atlanta, GA
March 1, 1921	Georgia; SIAA tournament championship	W 20–19	13–1	Atlanta Memorial Auditorium; Atlanta, GA
*Non-conference game. ^{#}Rankings from AP Poll. (#) Tournament seedings in parentheses.
