= William McAvoy =

American sports coach (1884–1956)

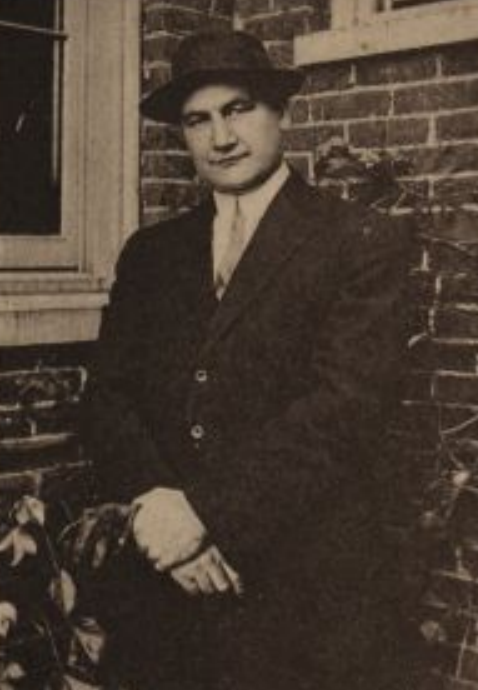
- McAvoy pictured in The Blue Hen 1913, Delaware yearbook

Biographical details
- Born: October 16, 1884; Hazleton, Pennsylvania, U.S.
- Died: September 17, 1956 (aged 71); Burlington County, New Jersey, U.S.

Playing career

Football
- 1902–1903: Bloomsburg Normal
- 1904–1906: Lafayette

Baseball
- 1903–1904: Bloomsburg Normal
- 1905–1907: Lafayette
- 1908: Rochester Bronchos
- 1909: Syracuse Stars
- 1910: Reading Pretzels
- 1910: Northampton Meadowlarks
- Positions: Fullback (football); Left fielder (baseball)

Coaching career (HC unless noted)

Football
- 1908–1916: Delaware
- 1920–1921: Drexel
- 1922–1924: Delaware
- 1925–1927: Vermont

Basketball
- 1909–1918: Delaware
- 1919–1920: Lafayette
- 1920–1922: Drexel
- 1922–1925: Delaware
- 1925–1928: Vermont
- 1928–1929: Haverford

Baseball
- 1909–1914: Delaware
- 1923–1925: Delaware

Administrative career (AD unless noted)
- 1908–1917: Delaware
- 1922–1925: Delaware

Head coaching record
- Overall: 52–70–14 (football); 108–137 (basketball); 36–77–3 (baseball)

William James McAvoy (October 16, 1884 – September 17, 1956) was an American football, basketball, and baseball coach. He served as the head football coach at the University of Delaware (1908–1916, 1922–1924), Drexel University (1920–1921), and the University of Vermont (1925–1927), compiling a career college football head coaching record of 52–70–14.

A native of Hazleton, Pennsylvania, McAvoy attended Lafayette College, where he played football as a fullback and baseball as a left fielder. In the fall of 1906, he was elected captain of the 1907 Lafayette football team, but did not return to school the following year, instead going into business. In 1908, he played as a left fielder for the Rochester Bronchos of the Eastern League.

== Head coaching record ==
=== Football ===
Year	Team	Overall	Conference	Standing	Bowl/playoffs
Delaware Fightin' Blue Hens (Independent) (1908–1916)
1908	Delaware	3–4–1			
1909	Delaware	1–6–1			
1910	Delaware	1–2–2			
1911	Delaware	2–5–2			
1912	Delaware	1–6–1			
1913	Delaware	2–4–2			
1914	Delaware	7–1–1			
1915	Delaware	6–3			
1916	Delaware	4–3–1			
Drexel (Independent) (1920–1921)
1920	Drexel	0–6			
1921	Drexel	2–3–1			
Drexel:		2–9–1			
Delaware Fightin' Blue Hens (Independent) (1922–1924)
1922	Delaware	6–3			
1923	Delaware	5–3–1			
1924	Delaware	4–3–1			
Delaware:		42–43–13			
Vermont Green and Gold / Catamounts (Independent) (1925–1927)
1925	Vermont	3–6			
1926	Vermont	3–6			
1927	Vermont	2–6			
Vermont:		8–18			
Total:		52–70–14			

=== Basketball ===
Record table
Season	Team	Overall	Conference	Standing	Postseason
Delaware (Independent) (1909–1918)
1909–10	Delaware	5–7			
1910–11	Delaware	7–6			
1911–12	Delaware	2–10			
1912–13	Delaware	1–6			
1913–14	Delaware	3–6			
1914–15	Delaware	5–7			
1915–16	Delaware	7–4			
1916–17	Delaware	8–6			
1917–18	Delaware	5–6			
Lafayette (Independent) (1919–1920)
1919–20	Lafayette	3–7			
Lafayette:		3–7 (.300)			
Drexel Blue and Gold (Independent) (1920–1922)
1920–21	Drexel				
1921–22	Drexel				
Drexel:		12–14 (.462)			
Delaware Fightin' Blue Hens (Independent) (1922–1925)
1922–23	Delaware	7–6			
1923–24	Delaware	6–8			
1924–25	Delaware	2–11			
Delaware:		58–83 (.411)			
Vermont Green and Gold / Catamounts (Independent) (1925–1928)
1925–26	Vermont	12–9			
1926–27	Vermont	11–5			
1927–28	Vermont	10–9			
Vermont:		33–23 (.589)			
Haverford (Independent) (1928–1929)
1928–29	Haverford	2–10			
Haverford:		2–10 (.167)			
Total:		108–137 (.441)			

== See also ==
- List of college football head coaches with non-consecutive tenure
