= 1920–21 Penn Quakers men's basketball team =

American college basketball season

1920–21 Penn Quakers men's basketball
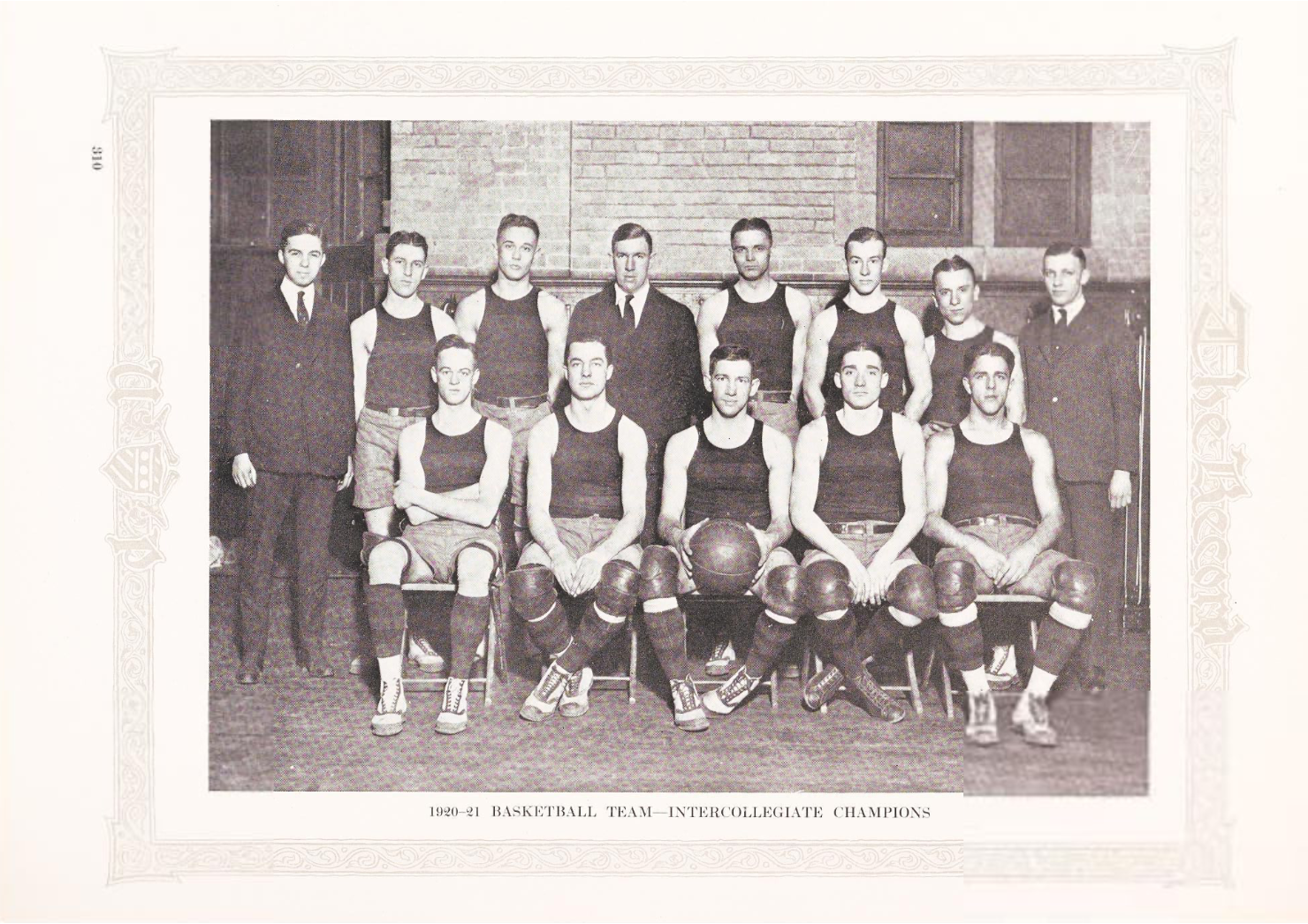
- Intercollegiate Champions

EIBL Champions Helms Foundation National Champions
- Conference: Eastern Intercollegiate Basketball League
- Record: 21–2 (9–1 EIBL)
- Head coach: Edward McNichol (1st season)
- Captain: Dan McNichol

1920–21 Eastern Intercollegiate Basketball League standings
	Conf.				Overall
Team	W		L	PCT	W		L	PCT
Penn	9	–	1	.900	21	–	2	.913
Dartmouth	7	–	3	.700	13	–	9	.591
Cornell	6	–	4	.600	12	–	10	.545
Princeton	4	–	6	.400	14	–	9	.609
Columbia	3	–	7	.300	7	–	9	.438
Yale	1	–	9	.100	9	–	17	.346

The 1920–21 Penn Quakers men's basketball team represented the University of Pennsylvania during the 1920–21 NCAA men's basketball season in the United States. The head coach was Edward McNichol, coaching in his first season with the Quakers. The team finished the season with a 21–2 record and was retroactively named the national champion by the Helms Athletic Foundation. This was Penn's second consecutive Helms national championship, the previous year's 21–1 team having later been recognized as the Helms (and Premo-Porretta Power Poll) national champion as well.

Senior Dan McNichol, Edward's younger brother, was named a consensus All-American at the end of the season.

== Schedule and results ==
Date time, TV	Rank^{#}	Opponent^{#}	Result	Record	Site city, state
Regular season
12/4/1920*		Ursinus	W 42–12	1–0	Philadelphia, PA
12/8/1920*		Temple	W 24–19	2–0	Philadelphia, PA
12/11/1920*		Muhlenberg	W 36–14	3–0	Philadelphia, PA
12/14/1920*		Drexel; Battle of 33rd Street	W 28–10	4–0	Philadelphia, PA
1/8/1921*		Syracuse	W 14–8	5–0	Philadelphia, PA
1/15/1921		Columbia	W 22–16	6–0 (1–0)	Philadelphia, PA
1/19/1921*		Catholic	W 19–17	7–0	Philadelphia, PA
1/22/1921		Dartmouth	W 26–18	8–0 (2–0)	Philadelphia, PA
1/29/1921*		Lafayette	W 37–12	9–0	Philadelphia, PA
2/2/1921*		NYU	W 24–11	10–0	Philadelphia, PA
2/5/1921*		Lehigh	W 19–10	11–0	Philadelphia, PA
2/7/1921*		VMI	W 40–15	12–0	Philadelphia, PA
2/12/1921		Cornell	L 19–20	12–1 (2–1)	Philadelphia, PA
2/16/1921		Columbia	W 19–18	13–1 (3–1)	Philadelphia, PA
2/19/1921		Cornell	W 22–20	14–1 (4–1)	Philadelphia, PA
2/22/1921		Yale	W 29–11	15–1 (5–1)	Philadelphia, PA
2/26/1921*		Delaware	W 44–13	16–1	Philadelphia, PA
3/2/1921*		Swarthmore	W 29–17	17–1	Philadelphia, PA
3/5/1921		Yale	W 48–13	18–1 (6–1)	Philadelphia, PA
3/9/1921*		Penn State	L 19–21	18–2	Philadelphia, PA
3/12/1921		Princeton; Rivalry	W 33–22	19–2 (7–1)	Philadelphia, PA
3/16/1921		Dartmouth	W 31–16	20–2 (8–1)	Philadelphia, PA
3/19/1921		Princeton; Rivalry	W 27–20	21–2 (9–1)	Philadelphia, PA
*Non-conference game. ^{#}Rankings from AP Poll. (#) Tournament seedings in parentheses.
