= 1929–30 Penn Quakers men's basketball team =

American college basketball season

1929–30 Penn Quakers men's basketball
- Conference: Eastern Intercollegiate Basketball League
- Record: 20–6 (7–3 EIBL)
- Head coach: Edward McNichol
- Home arena: The Palestra

1929–30 Eastern Intercollegiate Basketball League standings
	Conf.				Overall
Team	W		L	PCT	W		L	PCT
Columbia	9	–	1	.900	15	–	5	.750
Penn	7	–	3	.700	20	–	6	.769
Yale	4	–	6	.400	13	–	8	.619
Dartmouth	4	–	6	.400	11	–	9	.550
Princeton	3	–	7	.300	13	–	12	.520
Cornell	3	–	7	.300	6	–	12	.333

The 1929–30 Penn Quakers men's basketball team was a college basketball team that represented the University of Pennsylvania in the 1929–30 NCAA men's basketball season. The Quakers, coached by Edward McNichol, played in the Eastern Intercollegiate Basketball League and won 20 games. This was the program’s third straight 20+ win season. Leonard Tanseer was the Quakers' leading scorer, averaging 6.3 points per game.
