= 1920–21 Kansas Jayhawks men's basketball team =

American college basketball season

1920–21 Kansas Jayhawks men's basketball
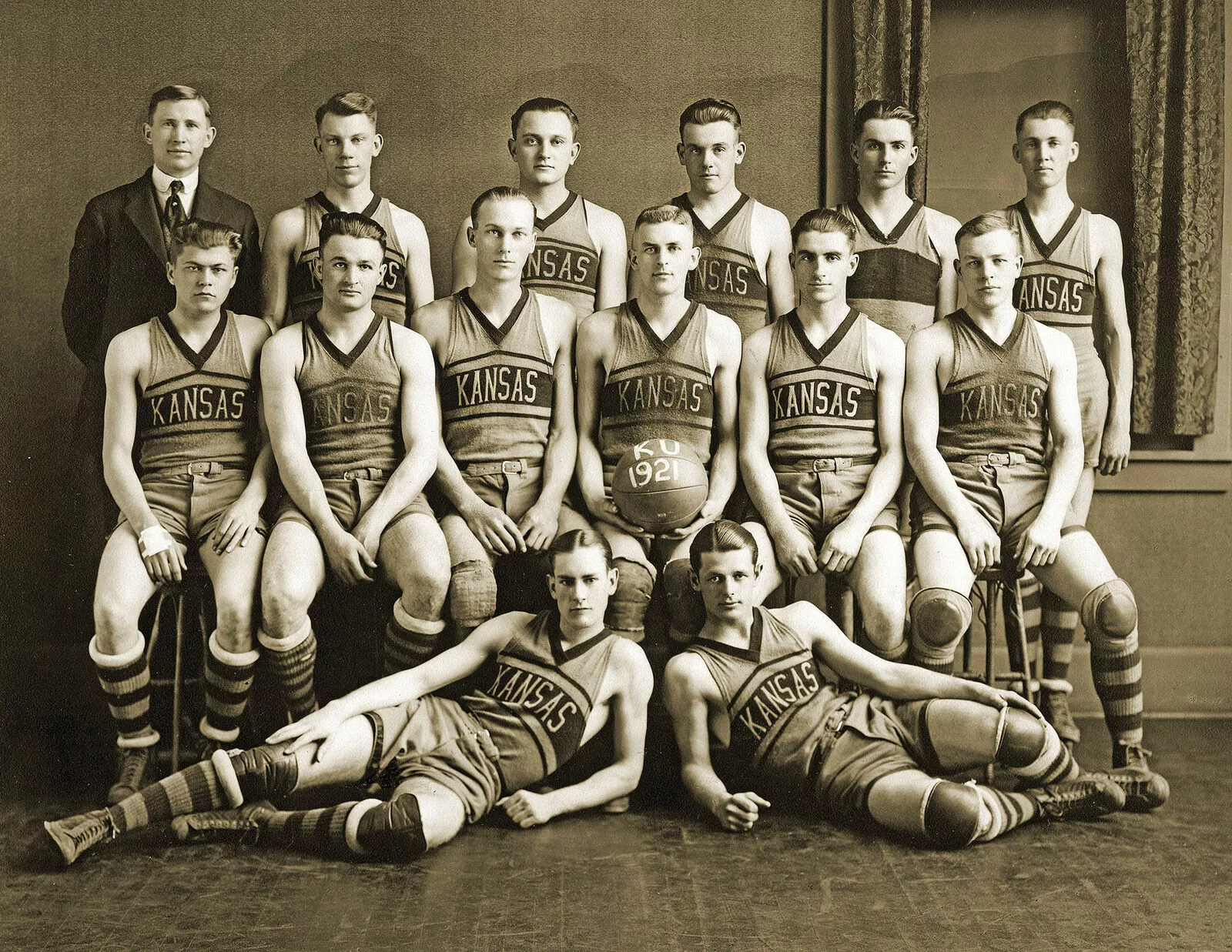
- Conference: Missouri Valley Intercollegiate Athletic Association
- Record: 10–8 (10–8 MVIAA)
- Head coach: Phog Allen (4th season)
- Captain: Ernst Uhrlaub
- Home arena: Robinson Gymnasium

1920–21 Missouri Valley Intercollegiate Athletic Association men's basketball standings
	Conf.				Overall
Team	W		L	PCT	W		L	PCT
Missouri	17	–	1	.944	17	–	1	.944
Nebraska	9	–	1	.900	15	–	3	.833
Kansas State	11	–	4	.733	14	–	5	.737
Kansas	10	–	8	.556	10	–	8	.556
Iowa State	6	–	8	.429	10	–	8	.556
Oklahoma	5	–	9	.357	10	–	8	.556
Drake	5	–	8	.385	10	–	8	.556
Grinnell	2	–	12	.143	6	–	12	.333
Washington University	2	–	16	.111	3	–	17	.150

The 1920–21 Kansas Jayhawks men's basketball team represented the University of Kansas during the 1920–21 college men's basketball season.

== Roster ==
- Roy Bennett
- Waldo Bowman
- Paul Endacott
- Armin F. Woestemeyer
- Clarence Houk
- Andrew McDonald
- Herbert Olson
- George Rody
- Adolph Rupp
- George Staplin
- Ernst Uhrlaub
- John Wulf

== Schedule and results ==
Date time, TV	Rank^{#}	Opponent^{#}	Result	Record	Site city, state
January 7		Drake	W 41–18	1-0 (1-0)	Robinson Gymnasium; Lawrence, KS
January 8		Drake	W 34–28	2-0 (2-0)	Robinson Gymnasium; Lawrence, KS
January 14		at Iowa State	W 28–13	3-0 (3-0)	State Gymnasium; Ames, IA
January 15		at Iowa State	W 17–15	4-0 (4-0)	State Gymnasium; Ames, IA
January 21		at Grinnell	W 35–20	5-0 (5-0)	State Gymnasium; Lawrence, KS
January 22		Grinnell	W 31–17	6-0 (6-0)	Robinson Gymnasium; Lawrence, KS
January 28		at Missouri; Border War	L 22–27	6-1 (6-1)	Rothwell Gymnasium; Columbia, MO
January 29		at Missouri; Border War	L 21–28	6-2 (6-2)	Rothwell Gymnasium; Columbia, MO
February 4		Kansas State; Sunflower Showdown	L 18–31	6-3 (6-3)	Robinson Gymnasium; Lawrence, KS
February 5		Kansas State; Sunflower Showdown	L 22–24	6-4 (6-4)	Robinson Gymnasium; Lawrence, KS
February 9		Washington University (MO)	W 39–28	7-4 (7-4)	Robinson Gymnasium; Lawrence, KS
February 10		Washington University (MO)	W 46–17	8-4 (8-4)	Robinson Gymnasium; Lawrence, KS
February 18		at Kansas State; Sunflower Showdown	L 30–36	8-5 (8-5)	Nichols Hall; Manhattan, KS
February 19		at Kansas State; Sunflower Showdown	L 18–26	8-6 (8-6)	Nichols Halls; Manhattan, KS
February 25		Missouri; Border War	L 17–33	8-7 (8-7)	Robinson Gymnasium; Lawrence, KS
February 26		Missouri; Border War	L 30–41	8-8 (8-8)	Robinson Gymnasium; Lawrence, KS
March 4		at Oklahoma	W 33–30	9-8 (9-8)	Norman, OK
March 5		at Oklahoma	W 37–32	10-8 (10-8)	Norman, OK
*Non-conference game. ^{#}Rankings from AP Poll. (#) Tournament seedings in parentheses.
