= 1921–22 Drexel Blue and Gold men's basketball team =

American college basketball season

1921–22 Drexel Blue and Gold men's basketball
- Conference: Independent
- Record: –
- Head coach: William McAvoy (2nd season)
- Captain: R. Everett Sidwell
- Home arena: Main Building

The 1921–22 Drexel Blue and Gold men's basketball team represented Drexel Institute of Art, Science and Industry during the 1921–22 men's basketball season. The Blue and Gold, led by 2nd year head coach William McAvoy, played their home games at Main Building.

== Roster ==
1921–22 Drexel Dragons men's basketball team
Players
Coaches

Pos.	#	Name	Height	Weight	Year	Previous school	Hometown
F	5	William Greenwood	—	—		Wilmington High School
F	2	Louis B. Weinberger	—	—
C	1	R. Everett Sidwell (C)	—	—
G	3	E.C. Straubel	—	—
G	4	Charles Connell	—	—	So
	6	Kelly	—	—
F		Siddel	—	—

Head coach

- William McAvoy (Lafayette)

Assistant coach(es)

Legend

- (C) Team captain
- (S) Suspended
- (I) Ineligible
- (W) Walk-on
- Injured
- Current redshirt

== Schedule ==
Date time, TV	Rank^{#}	Opponent^{#}	Result	Record	High points	High rebounds	High assists	Site (attendance) city, state
Regular season
December 1, 1921*; 8:15 pm		at Wilmington Collegiates	W 40–39 ^{OT}	1–0	18 – Greenwood	–	–	
December 7, 1921*; 8:15 pm		at Penn; Battle of 33rd Street	L 10–24	1–1	–	–	–	Weightman Hall; Philadelphia, PA
December 11, 1921*		at Rutgers	L 15–38	1–2	–	–	–	College Avenue Gymnasium; New Brunswick, NJ
December 12, 1921*		at Haverford; Exhibition Game	L 20–24	1–3	12 – Sidwell	–	–	
January 12, 1922*		Hahnemann	W 34–		12 – Tied	–	–	Main Building; Philadelphia, PA
January 17, 1922*		Philadelphia Pharmacy						Main Building; Philadelphia, PA
January 21, 1922*		at Crescent Athletic Club	L 18–55		8 – Weinberger	–	–	Crescent Athletic Club House; Brooklyn, NY
January 27, 1922*		Brooklyn Law	W –		–	–	–	Main Building; Philadelphia, PA
January 30, 1922*		Brooklyn Polytech	L 16–33		–	–	–	Main Building; Philadelphia, PA
February 3, 1922*		at Pratt	W 23–20		–	–	–	
February 9, 1922*		at Ursinus	L –		–	–	–	Collegeville, PA
February 11, 1922*; 8:00 pm		Haverford; Exhibition Game	W 34–23		12 – Greenwood	–	–	Main Building; Philadelphia, PA
February 16, 1922*		Juniata	L 29–38		–	–	–	Main Building; Philadelphia, PA
February 17, 1922*		New York Agricultural College	W 44–27		16 – Weinberger	–	–	Main Building; Philadelphia, PA
February 18, 1922*		Drexel Alumni						Main Building; Philadelphia, PA
February 23, 1922*		Lebanon Valley	L 30–40		–	–	–	Main Building; Philadelphia, PA
February 24, 1922*		Princeton Nassau						Main Building; Philadelphia, PA
March 1, 1922*		at Pennsylvania Military College	L 26–36		–	–	–	Chester, PA
March 8, 1922*		Ursinus	W 38–33		20 – Sidwell	–	–	Main Building; Philadelphia, PA
*Non-conference game. ^{#}Rankings from AP. (#) Tournament seedings in parentheses. All times are in Eastern Time.
