= 1920–21 Drexel Blue and Gold men's basketball team =

American college basketball season

1920–21 Drexel Blue and Gold men's basketball
- Conference: Independent
- Record: –
- Head coach: William McAvoy (1st season)
- Captain: R. Everett Sidwell
- Home arena: Main Building

The 1920–21 Drexel Blue and Gold men's basketball team represented Drexel Institute of Art, Science and Industry during the 1920–21 men's basketball season. The Blue and Gold, led by 1st year head coach William McAvoy, played their home games at Main Building.

== Roster ==
1920–21 Drexel Dragons men's basketball team
Players
Coaches

Pos.	#	Name	Height	Weight	Year	Previous school	Hometown
C		R. Everett Sidwell (C)	—	—
F		Louis B. Weinberger	—	—
F		E.C. Straubel	—	—
G		Ellis E. Ratcliffe	—	—
G		Charles Connell	—	—	Fr
		Matter	—	—
G		Marshall	—	—
G		Brackin	—	—
G		L.B. Neinberger	—	—
F		Mansfield	—	—

Head coach

- William McAvoy (Lafayette)

Assistant coach(es)

Legend

- (C) Team captain
- (S) Suspended
- (I) Ineligible
- (W) Walk-on
- Injured
- Current redshirt

== Schedule ==
Date time, TV	Rank^{#}	Opponent^{#}	Result	Record	High points	High rebounds	High assists	Site (attendance) city, state
Regular season
December 14, 1920*; 8:15 pm		at Penn; Battle of 33rd Street	L 10–28	0–1	–	–	–	Weightman Hall; Philadelphia, PA
December 17, 1920*		at Haverford	L 12–21	0–2	4 – Sidwell	–	–	Ryan Gym; Haverford, PA
December 28, 1920*		at Crescent Athletic Club (Brooklyn)	L 17–41		8 – Sidwell	–	–	Crescent Athletic Club House; Brooklyn, NY
Unknown*		Gettysburg						
Unknown*		Hahnemann	W –		–	–	–	
January 21, 1921*		Lebanon Valley	L 32–35		–	–	–	Main Building; Philadelphia, PA
January 22, 1921*		at Parkside (DE)						Wilmington, DE
January 28, 1921*		Muhlenberg	W 29–27		–	–	–	
January 29, 1921*		Princeton Nassau	W 28–17		– Ratcliffe	–	–	
1921*		Ursinus	W –		–	–	–	
February 1921*		Johns Hopkins	W 50–27		–	–	–	
February 26, 1921*		MIT	W 32–22		–	–	–	Main Building; Philadelphia, PA
*Non-conference game. ^{#}Rankings from AP. (#) Tournament seedings in parentheses. All times are in Eastern Time.

- Note: All games, except the last 6, are listed out of order
