= Edward McNichol =

American college basketball player and coach (1895–?)

Biographical details
- Born: February 20, 1895; Philadelphia, Pennsylvania, U.S.

Playing career
- 1914–1917: Penn
- Position: Guard

Coaching career (HC unless noted)
- 1920–1930: Penn

Head coaching record
- Overall: 186–63 (.747)

Accomplishments and honors

Championships
- Helms National (1921); 3× EIBL (1921, 1928–1929)

Awards
- NCAA All-American (1916); 2× EIBL First Team (1916–1917)

Edward Joseph McNichol (February 20, 1895 – after 1930) was the head men's basketball coach for the University of Pennsylvania from 1920 to 1930. His first Penn team finished the season with a 21–2 record and was retroactively named the national champion by the Helms Athletic Foundation. This was Penn's second consecutive Helms national championship, the previous year's 21–1 team having later been recognized as the Helms (and Premo-Porretta Power Poll) national champion as well.

McNichol played on Penn's basketball team from 1914 to 1917. In his junior season in 1915–16, he was named a consensus All-American by the Helms Athletic Foundation. In both 1915–16 and 1916–17 he served as team captain and was a two-time Eastern Intercollegiate Basketball League First Team selection.

After his coaching career, he served in the United States Army during World War I. According to a 1919 edition of the Year Book of the Pennsylvania Society, McNichol was a sergeant in the 469th Railroad Engineers for the Army.

== Head coaching record ==
Record table
Season	Team	Overall	Conference	Standing	Postseason
Penn Quakers (Eastern Intercollegiate Basketball League) (1920–1930)
1920–21	Penn	21–2	9–1	1st	Helms National Champions
1921–22	Penn	24–3	8–3	T–2nd	
1922–23	Penn	14–11	3–7	T–5th	
1923–24	Penn	18–8	3–7	T–5th	
1924–25	Penn	17–5	6–4	T–2nd	
1925–26	Penn	14–7	5–5	T–3rd	
1926–27	Penn	16–10	5–5	T–3rd	
1927–28	Penn	22–5	7–3	T–1st	
1928–29	Penn	20–6	8–2	1st	
1929–30	Penn	20–6	7–3	2nd	
Total:		186–63 (.747)			
National champion Postseason invitational champion Conference regular season champion Conference regular season and conference tournament champion Division regular season champion Division regular season and conference tournament champion Conference tournament champion
