= 1920–21 Michigan State Normal Normalites men's basketball team =

American college basketball season

1920–21 Michigan State Normal Normalites men's basketball

Michigan Intercollegiate Athletic Association Champions
- Conference: Michigan Intercollegiate Athletic Association
- Record: 13–4 (8–1 MIAA)
- Head coach: Elton Rynearson (4th season)
- Home arena: Gymnasium

The 1920–21 Michigan State Normal Normalites men's basketball team represented the Michigan State Normal School, now Eastern Michigan University, in the 1920–21 NCAA men's basketball season. They were readmitted back into the Michigan Intercollegiate Athletic Association for the 1920-21 season. The team finished with a record of 13–4 and won the Michigan Intercollegiate Athletic Association Championship. The team was led by head coach Elton Rynearson, in his fourth year. Boyd "Bill" Williams was the team captain.

== Roster ==
Number	Name	Position	Class	Hometown
	Harold Osborne	Center	Sophomore	Whittaker, MI
	Paul Burrell	Center	Freshman	Ypsilanti, MI
	Perry Deakin	Guard	Freshman	Detroit, MI
	Cliff Crane	Forward	Senior	Linden, MI
	Bill Williams	Forward		
	A.D. Walker	Guard	Sophomore	Cass City, MI
	Franklin Austin	Guard	Junior	Laingsburg, MI
	Berthol Mackin	Guard		
	James W. Hole	Forward		
	Marshall Wilkshire	Forward		

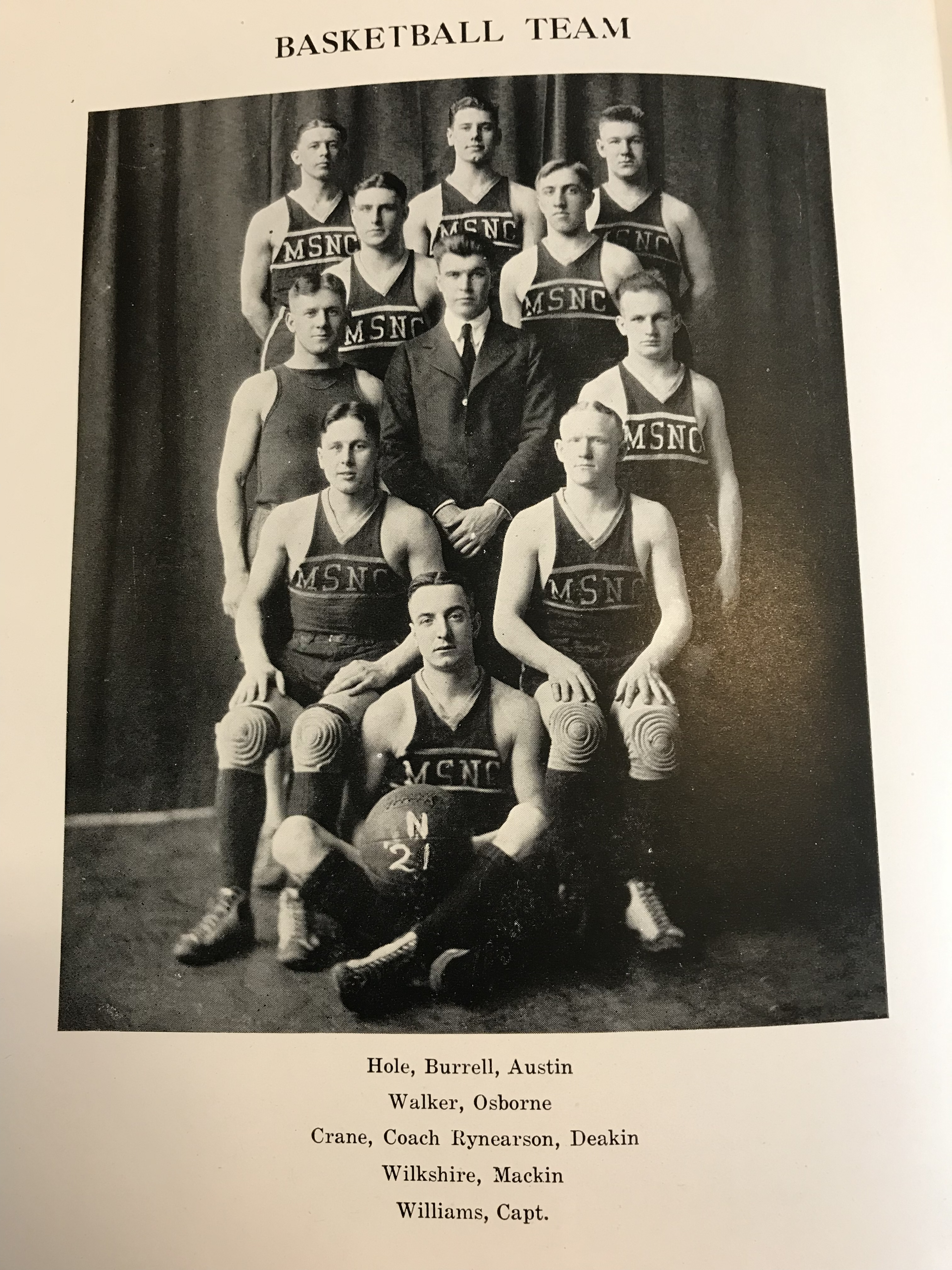
The 1920–21 team photo

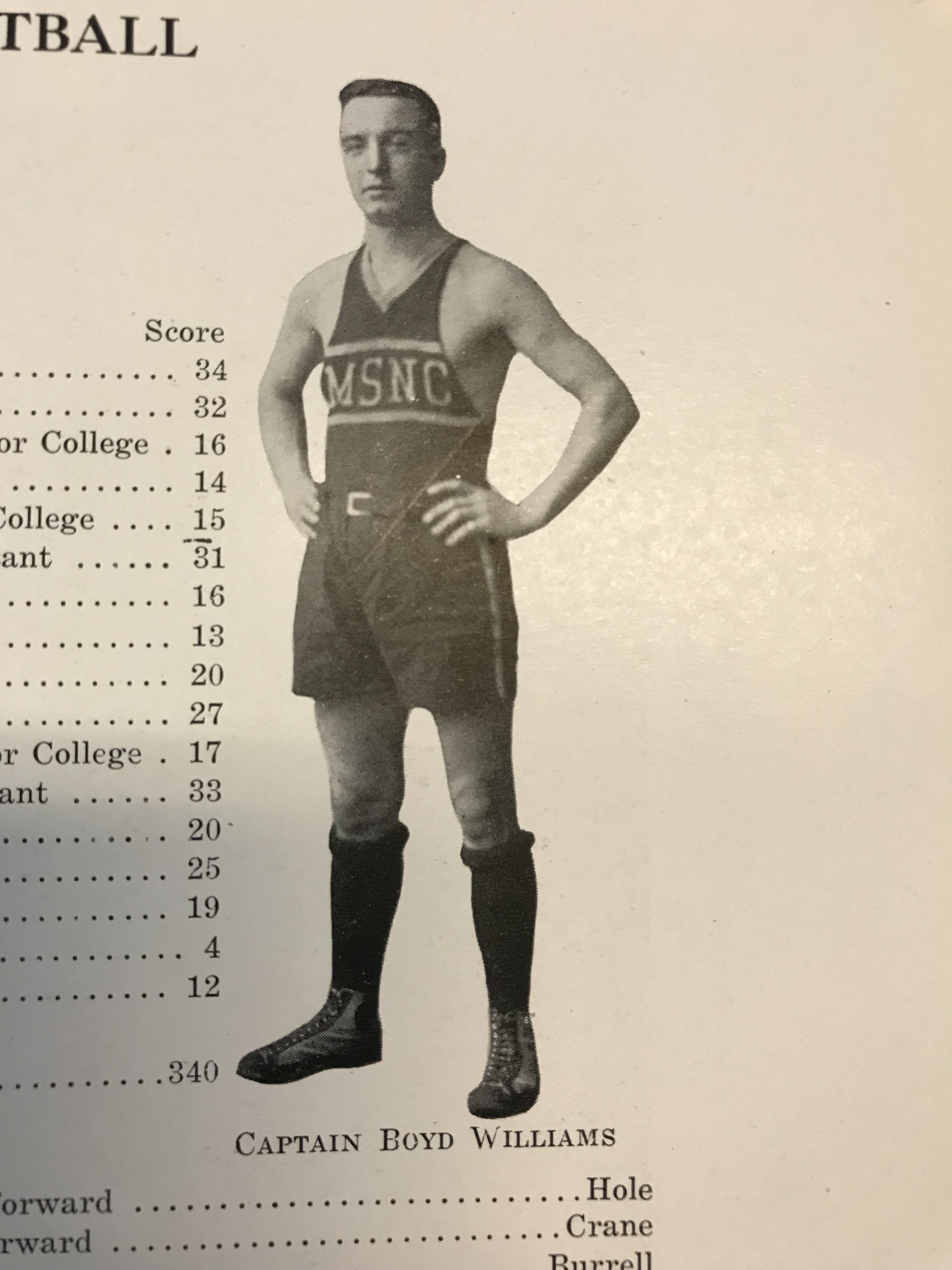
Team captain Boyd Williams

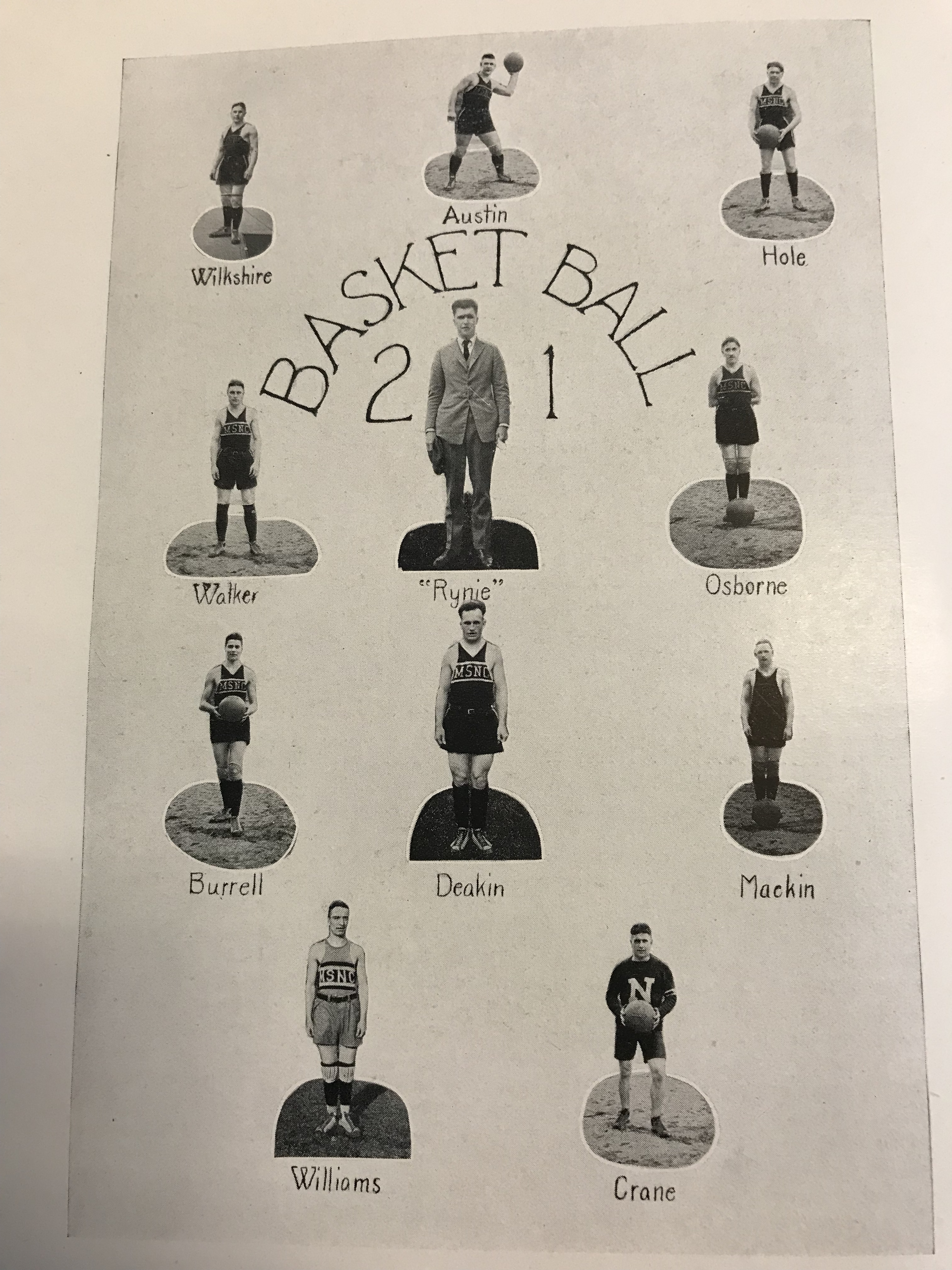
Yearbook page showing the team lineup

== Schedule ==
Date time, TV	Opponent	Result	Record	Site (attendance) city, state
Non-conference regular season
December 15, 1920*; 6:30	Alumni	W 42–34	1–0	Gymnasium; Ypsilanti, MI
January 7, 1921*	Detroit YMCA	L 23–32	1–1	Gymnasium; Ypsilanti, MI
January 1921*	Wayne State	W 21–16	2–1	Gymnasium; Ypsilanti, MI
January 19, 1921	at Hillsdale College	W 22–14	3–1 (1–0)	Hillsdale, MI
January 21, 1921	Kalamazoo College	W 18–15	4–1 (2–0)	Gymnasium; Ypsilanti, MI
January 26, 1921	at Albion College	W 20–13	5–1 (3–0)	Albion, MI
January 29, 1921	at Adrian College	W 37–20	6–1 (4–0)	Adrian, MI
February 4, 1921*	Detroit YMCA	W 29–27	7–1	Gymnasium; Ypsilanti, MI
February 12, 1921*	Central Michigan	L 26–33	7–2	Gymnasium; Ypsilanti, MI
February 14, 1921*	at Assumption University	W 30–20	8–2	Windsor, Ontario
February 16, 1921*	at Wayne State	W 18–17	9–2	Detroit, MI
February 18, 1921	Hillsdale College	W 42–25	10–2 (5–0)	Gymnasium; Ypsilanti, MI
February 24, 1921*	at Central Michigan	L 20–31	10–3	Mount Pleasant, MI
February 26, 1921	at Alma College	L 16–18	10–4 (5–1)	Alma, MI
March 3, 1921	Adrian College	W 28–19	11–4 (6–1)	Gymnasium (1,000); Ypsilanti, MI
March 4, 1921	Albion College	W 45–4	12–4 (7–1)	Gymnasium; Ypsilanti, MI
March 5, 1921; 7:30	Alma College	W 18–12	13–4 (8–1)	Gymnasium; Ypsilanti, MI
*Non-conference game. (#) Tournament seedings in parentheses. All times are in Eastern Time.

== Game Notes ==
=== January 7, 1921 ===
Eastern Echo has score of 22-32. Cliff Crane missed the game because he was coaching the Cleary University team the same night.

=== January 15, 1921 ===
Wayne State has a score of 28-13.

=== February 12, 1921 ===
Wayne State has a date of February 9, 1921 with a score of 27-33, Wayne State victory.

=== February 26, 1921 ===
EMU Media Guide has a score of 14-16.
