= 1920–21 Iowa State Cyclones men's basketball team =

American college basketball season

1920–21 Iowa State Cyclones men's basketball
- Conference: Missouri Valley Intercollegiate Athletic Association
- Record: 10–8 (6–8 MVIAA)
- Head coach: Maury Kent (1st season)
- Assistant coach: E.E. Mylin
- Home arena: State Gymnasium

1920–21 Missouri Valley Intercollegiate Athletic Association men's basketball standings
	Conf.				Overall
Team	W		L	PCT	W		L	PCT
Missouri	17	–	1	.944	17	–	1	.944
Nebraska	9	–	1	.900	15	–	3	.833
Kansas State	11	–	4	.733	14	–	5	.737
Kansas	10	–	8	.556	10	–	8	.556
Iowa State	6	–	8	.429	10	–	8	.556
Oklahoma	5	–	9	.357	10	–	8	.556
Drake	5	–	8	.385	10	–	8	.556
Grinnell	2	–	12	.143	6	–	12	.333
Washington University	2	–	16	.111	3	–	17	.150

The 1920–21 Iowa State Cyclones men's basketball team (also known informally as Ames) represented Iowa State University during the 1920–21 NCAA men's basketball season. The Cyclones were coached by Maury Kent, who was in his first and only season with the Cyclones. They played their home games at the State Gymnasium in Ames, Iowa.

They finished the season 10–8, 6–8 in Missouri Valley play to finish in fifth place.

== Roster ==
1920–21 Iowa State Cyclones men's basketball team
Players
Coaches

Pos.	#	Name	Height	Weight	Year	Hometown
F		W.J. Ahern	—	—	Jr
		W.H. Bartlett	—	—	So
		M.A. "Shorty" Boyd	—	—
C		H.T. Boyle	—	—	So
G		Jack Currie	—	—	Jr
F		"Pinky" Greene	—	—	So
F		R.B. Hubbard	—	—	Sr
C		M.N. Innes	—	—	Jr
C		W.M. Merriam	—	—	Jr
G		Orr	—	—
G		Bill Paige	—	—	Sr
F		E.M. Porter	—	—	So
		Harry Shepard (C)	—	—	Sr
G		S.N. White	—	—	Sr
G		F.W. Willimack	—	—	Sr
G		H.E. Woodward	—	—	Jr

Head coach

- Maury Kent

Assistant coach(es)

E.E. Mylin

Legend

- (C) Team captain
- (S) Suspended
- (I) Ineligible
- (W) Walk-on
- Injured
- Current redshirt

== Schedule and results ==
Date time, TV	Rank^{#}	Opponent^{#}	Result	Record	Site city, state
Regular season
December 18, 1920*		Coe	W 51–25	1–0	State Gymnasium; Ames, Iowa
January 1, 1921*		at Fort Dodge YMCA	W 21–11	2–0	Fort Dodge, Iowa
January 7, 1921		at Missouri	L 11–30	2–1 (0–1)	Rothwell Gymnasium; Columbia, Missouri
January 8, 1921		at Missouri	L 19–28	2–2 (0–2)	Rothwell Gymnasium; Columbia, Missouri
January 14, 1921		Kansas	L 13–28	2–3 (0–3)	State Gymnasium; Ames, Iowa
January 15, 1921		Kansas	L 15–17	2–4 (0–4)	State Gymnasium; Ames, Iowa
January 21, 1921; 4:30 pm		Kansas State	W 27–17	3–4 (1–4)	State Gymnasium; Ames, Iowa
January 22, 1921		Kansas State	L 21–25	3–5 (1–5)	State Gymnasium; Ames, Iowa
January 28, 1921		at Washington University (MO)	W 33–13	4–5 (2–5)	Francis Gymnasium; St. Louis, Missouri
January 29, 1921		at Washington University (MO)	W 25–21	5–5 (3–5)	Francis Gymnasium; St. Louis, Missouri
February 9, 1921		Nebraska	W 38–30	6–5 (4–5)	State Gymnasium; Ames, Iowa
February 10, 1921		Nebraska	L 23–32	6–6 (4–6)	State Gymnasium; Ames, Iowa
February 15, 1921*		at Iowa; CyHawk Rivalry	W 20–16	7–6	First Iowa Armory; Iowa City, Iowa
February 22, 1921		at Grinnell	W 25–16	8–6 (5–6)	Grinnell, Iowa
February 26, 1921		Grinnell	W 25–20	9–6 (6–6)	State Gymnasium; Ames, Iowa
March 4, 1921		at Nebraska	L 16–33	9–7 (6–7)	Grant Memorial Hall; Lincoln, Nebraska
March 5, 1921		at Nebraska	L 11–37	9–8 (6–8)	Grant Memorial Hall; Lincoln, Nebraska
March 11, 1921		Iowa; CyHawk Rivalry	W 26–18	10–8	State Gymnasium; Ames, Iowa
*Non-conference game. ^{#}Rankings from AP poll. (#) Tournament seedings in parentheses. All times are in Central Time.
