= 1920–21 Washington Sun Dodgers men's basketball team =

American college basketball season

1920–21 Washington Sun Dodgers men's basketball
- Conference: Pacific Coast Conference
- Record: 18–4 (10–4 PCC)
- Head coach: Hec Edmundson (1st season)
- Captain: Arch Talbot

1920–21 Pacific Coast Conference men's basketball standings
	Conf.				Overall
Team	W		L	PCT	W		L	PCT
Stanford	8	–	3	.727	15	–	3	.833
California	8	–	3	.727	15	–	4	.789
Washington	10	–	4	.714	18	–	4	.818
Oregon	8	–	4	.667	15	–	5	.750
Washington State	3	–	11	.214	12	–	16	.429
Oregon Agricultural	2	–	14	.125	6	–	17	.261
As of 1921

The 1920–21 Washington Sun Dodgers men's basketball team represented the University of Washington for the 1920–21 college basketball season. Led by first-year head coach Hec Edmundson, the Huskies were members of the Pacific Coast Conference and played their home games on campus in Seattle, Washington.

The Huskies were 18–4 overall in the regular season and 10–4 in conference play; fourth in the standings. Washington ended the season with eight consecutive wins, six in conference.

Edmundson joined the UW athletic staff in 1920 as track coach, and also led the Husky basketball program for 27 years; he continued as track coach for seven more, retiring in the summer of 1954. A native of Moscow, Idaho, (and an Olympian in track in 1912) he had previously coached basketball for two seasons in his hometown at his alma mater, Idaho.
