= 1920–21 Colgate men's basketball team =

American college basketball season

1920–21 Colgate Raiders men's basketball
- Conference: Independent
- Record: 16–6
- Head coach: William Reid (2nd season)
- Captain: Nels Anderson
- Home arena: none

The 1920–21 Colgate Raiders men's basketball team represented Colgate University during the 1920–21 college men's basketball season. The head coach was William Reid, coaching the Raiders in his second season. The team had finished with an overall record of 16–6. The team captain was Nels Anderson.

== Schedule ==
Date time, TV	Opponent	Result	Record	Site city, state
*	Clarkson	W 38–19	1–0	Hamilton, NY
*	RPI	W 59–26	2–0	Hamilton, NY
*	Alfred	W 85–08	3–0	Hamilton, NY
*	Hamilton	W 59–36	4–0	Hamilton, NY
*	at Williams	W 25–19	5–0	Williamstown, MA
*	at Albany State	W 56–22	6–0	
*	at RPI	L 15–21	6–1	
*	at West Virginia	W 30–28 ^{OT}	7–1	
*	Rochester	W 52–26	8–1	Hamilton, NY
*	Oneida Community LTD	W 60–16	9–1	Hamilton, NY
*	Detroit	W 37–36 ^{OT}	10–1	Erie, PA
*	Pittsburgh	L 50–69	10–2	Hamilton, NY
*	Syracuse	W 30–28	11–2	
*	Carnegie Tech	L 36–37	11–3	
*	at Oneida Community LTD	W 57–13	12–3	Hamilton, NY
*	at Creighton	L 29–32	12–4	
*	at Creighton	W 27–24	13–4	Hamilton, NY
*	at Nebraska	W 29–26	14–4	
*	at Nebraska	L 15–24	14–5	
*	at Hamilton	W 21–19	15–5	
*	at Rochester	W 27–10	16–5	Rochester, NY
*	at Syracuse	L 16–28	16–6	Archbold Gymnasium; Syracuse, NY
*Non-conference game. (#) Tournament seedings in parentheses.
