= 1916–17 Loyola Ramblers men's basketball team =

American college basketball season

1916–17 Loyola Ramblers men's basketball
- Conference: Independent
- Record: 1–3
- Head coach: unknown
- Home arena: none

The 1916–17 Loyola Ramblers men's basketball team represented Loyola University Chicago during the 1916–17 college men's basketball season. The team finished the season with an overall record of 1–3.

== Schedule ==
Date time, TV	Opponent	Result	Record	Site city, state
January 18, 1917*	Whiting College	L 21–91	0–1	Chicago, IL
January 23, 1917*	McHale K of C	W 43–20	1–1	Chicago, IL
*	Wilson Exmoors	L 27–55	1–2	Chicago, IL
February 17, 1917*	St. Viator's	L 9–29	1–3	Chicago, IL
*Non-conference game. (#) Tournament seedings in parentheses.
