= 1920–21 Kent State Normal College men's basketball team =

American college basketball season

1920–21 Kent State Normal College men's basketball
- Conference: Independent
- Record: 4–7
- Head coach: Paul G. Chandler (2nd season)

The 1919–20 Kent State Normal College men's basketball team was the men's basketball team at what is now Kent State University in Kent, Ohio, then known as Kent State Normal College.

The men's basketball team played eleven games in late 1920 and early 1921, finishing with a record of 4–7. It was the second year for coach Paul G. Chandler.

There was not yet an established nickname for teams for the college, and the school colors were the original orange and blue. Fred Shepard served as team captain with Ross Davis and Mike Jacobs as managers.

Games were held in various locations, such as the atrium of the original Administration Building (known as Cartwright Hall since 2006), in the basement of the original heating plant, and in the local Congregational Church gymnasium, as a permanent gymnasium was not built on campus until 1925.

== Schedule and results ==
Date time, TV	Opponent	Result	Record	Site city, state
December 10, 1920*	at Ashland	L 19–37	0–1	Ashland, OH
December 11, 1920*	at Baldwin-Wallace	L 7–23	0–2	Berea, OH
January 15, 1921*	at Bowling Green	W 27–22	1–2	Bowling Green, OH
January 21, 1921*	Ashland	L 19–33	1–3	Kent, OH
January 28, 1921*	Baldwin-Wallace	L 6–39	1–4	Kent, OH
February 4, 1921*	Dyke Business College	L 17–35	1–5	Kent, OH
February 2, 1921*	Davey Tree	L 12–17	1–6	Kent, OH
February 11, 1921*	Davey Tree	W 17–15	2–6	Kent, OH
February 18, 1921*	Bowling Green	W 27–25	3–6	Kent, OH
February 19, 1921*	Alumni	W 38–12	4–6	Kent, OH
February 4, 1921*	at Hiram College	L 24–42	4–7	Hiram, OH
*Non-conference game. (#) Tournament seedings in parentheses. Sources

== See also ==
- List of Kent State Golden Flashes men's basketball seasons
