= 1920–21 Trinity Blue and White men's basketball team =

American college basketball season

1920–21 Trinity Blue and White men's basketball
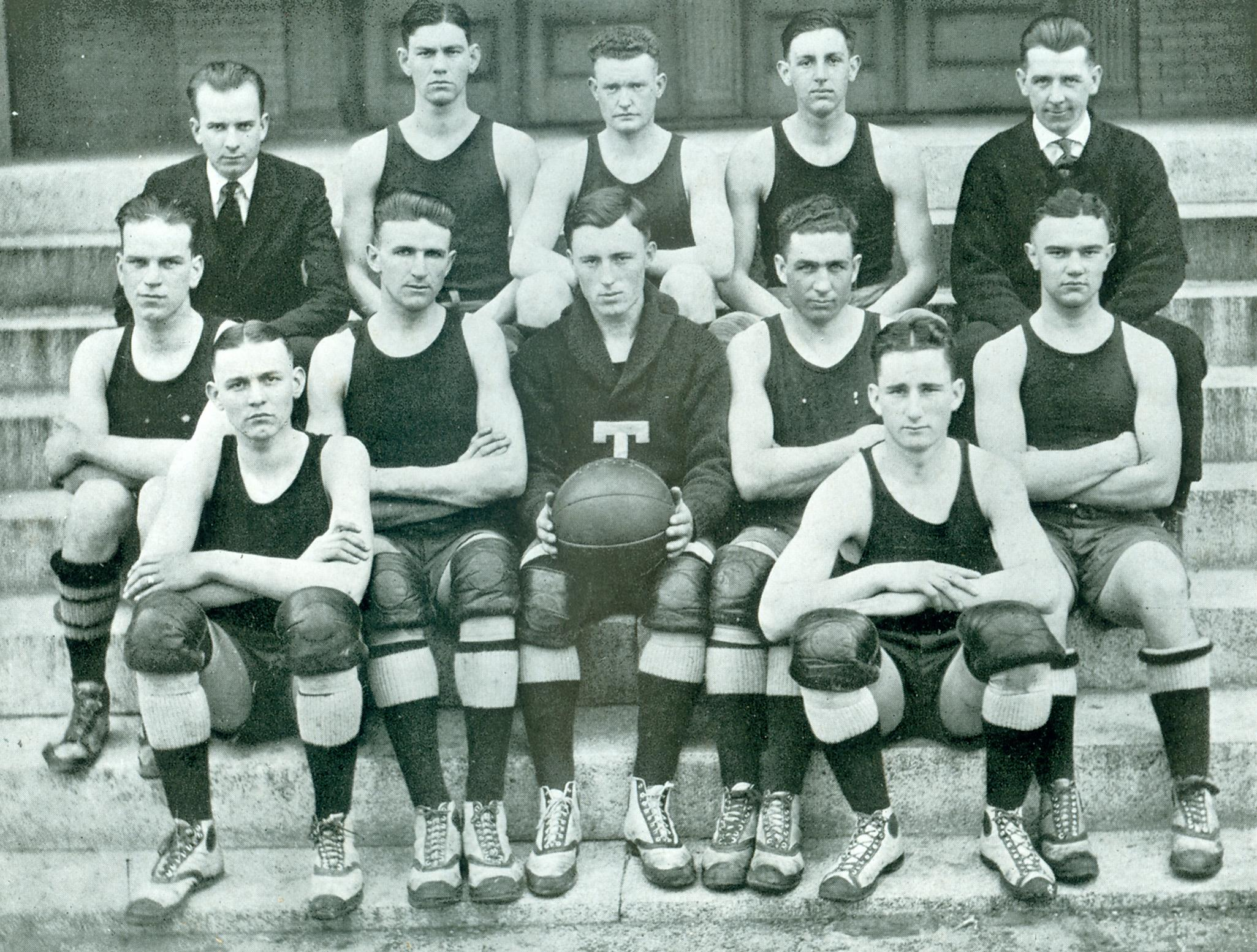
- Conference: Independent
- Record: 9–6
- Head coach: Floyd Egan (1st season)
- Captain: Loyd Hathaway
- Home arena: The Ark

The 1920–21 Trinity Blue and White's basketball team represented Trinity College (later renamed Duke University) during the 1920–21 men's college basketball season. The head coach was Floyd Egan, coaching his first season with Trinity. The team finished with an overall record of 9–6.

== Schedule ==
Date time, TV	Opponent	Result	Record	Site city, state
*	Guilford	W	1–0	The Ark; Durham, NC
*	N.C. State	W 35–11	2–0	The Ark; Durham, NC
*	Florida State	W	3–0	
*	at Washington and Lee	L	3–1	
*	at Wake Forest	W 27–20	4–1	Winston-Salem, NC
*	at VMI	L	4–2	
*	at Virginia Tech	L	4–3	
*	at N.C. State	W 34–27	5–3	
1/13/1921*	South Carolina	W 40–12	6–3	The Ark; Durham, NC
1/26/1921*	North Carolina	W 25–22	7–3	The Ark; Durham, NC
2/8/1921*	Florida	W 49–21	8–3	The Ark; Durham, NC
2/21/1921*	at Virginia	L 15–34	8–4	Charlottesville, VA
2/23/1921*	at North Carolina	L 12–44	8–5	Bynum Gym; Chapel Hill, NC
2/25/1921*	Virginia	W 24–22	9–5	
3/5/1921*	North Carolina	L 18–55	9–6	Raleigh, NC
*Non-conference game. (#) Tournament seedings in parentheses.
