= 1915–16 Loyola Ramblers men's basketball team =

American college basketball season

1915–16 Loyola Ramblers men's basketball
- Conference: Independent
- Record: 10–3–1
- Head coach: Percy Moore (1st season)
- Home arena: none

The 1915–16 Loyola Ramblers men's basketball team represented Loyola University Chicago during the 1915–16 college men's basketball season. The ramblers were led by first-year head coach Percy Moore. The team finished the season with an overall record of 10–3–1.

== Schedule ==
Date time, TV	Opponent	Result	Record	Site city, state
*	Armour Tech	W 38–23	1–0	Chicago, IL
*	First Regiment	T 18–18	1–0–1	Chicago, IL
*	Campion College	W 14–14	2–0–1	Chicago, IL
*	Chicago	W 33–16	3–0–1	Chicago, IL
*	St. Bede	W 50–11	4–0–1	Chicago, IL
*	Lane College	W 47–16	5–0–1	Chicago, IL
*	First National Bank	W 44–7	6–0–1	Chicago, IL
*	Notre Dame	L 15–24	6–1–1	Chicago, IL
*	St. Joseph's	W 72–5	7–1–1	Chicago, IL
*	St. Jariath A.A.U.	W 54–26	8–1–1	Chicago, IL
*	Illinois Athletic Club	L 26–52	8–2–1	Chicago, IL
*	Whiting College	W 34–30	9–2–1	Chicago, IL
*	Hamline College	W 23–19	10–2–1	Chicago, IL
*	Wheaton College	L 10–47	10–3–1	Chicago, IL
*Non-conference game. (#) Tournament seedings in parentheses.
