= 1914–15 Loyola Ramblers men's basketball team =

American college basketball season

1914–15 Loyola Ramblers men's basketball
- Conference: Independent
- Record: 8–3
- Home arena: none

The 1914–15 Loyola Ramblers men's basketball team represented Loyola University Chicago during the 1914–15 college men's basketball season. The team finished the season with an overall record of 8–3.

== Schedule ==
Date time, TV	Opponent	Result	Record	Site city, state
*	Chicago Teachers	W 68–23	1–0	Chicago, IL
*	First Regiment	W 32–24	2–0	Chicago, IL
*	Lombard College	L 20–21	2–1	Chicago, IL
*	Wheaton College	W 37–12	3–1	Chicago, IL
*	Elmhurst College	W 50–28	4–1	Chicago, IL
*	Lewis	L 23–26	4–2	Chicago, IL
*	St. Viator's	W 20–19	5–2	Chicago, IL
*	Notre Dame	L 18–41	5–3	Chicago, IL
*	Lewis	W 69–21	6–3	Chicago, IL
*	Lombard College	W 52–23	7–3	Chicago, IL
*	Wheaton	W 30–23	8–3	Chicago, IL
*Non-conference game. (#) Tournament seedings in parentheses.
