= 1920–21 Connecticut Aggies men's basketball team =

American college basketball season

1920–21 Connecticut Aggies men's basketball
- Conference: Athletic League of New England State Colleges
- Record: 7–9 (3–3 ALNESC)
- Head coach: M.R. Swartz (2nd season)
- Home arena: Hawley Armory

The 1920–21 Connecticut Aggies men's basketball team represented Connecticut Agricultural College, now the University of Connecticut, in the 1920–21 collegiate men's basketball season. The Aggies completed the season with a 7–9 overall record. The Aggies were members of the Athletic League of New England State Colleges, where they ended the season with a 3–3 record. The Aggies played their home games at Hawley Armory in Storrs, Connecticut, and were led by second-year head coach M.R. Swartz.

== Schedule ==
Date time, TV	Rank^{#}	Opponent^{#}	Result	Record	Site (attendance) city, state
Regular Season
*		Tufts	L 25–38	0–1	
*		Wesleyan	L 20–31	0–2	
*		Middlebury	W 33–25	1–2	
*		Springfield	L 29–32	1–3	
		Massachusetts	L 23–28	1–4 (0–1)	
*		Clark	L 20–28	1–5	
*		Tufts	W 33–23	2–5	
		Rhode Island	W 44–22	3–5 (1–1)	
*		Clark	W 39–26	4–5	
		Massachusetts	W 26–19	5–5 (2–1)	
		Rhode Island	L 18–29	5–6 (2–2)	
*		Worcester Polytech	L 17–42	5–7	
*		Trinity	L 17–21	5–8	
		New Hampshire	L 18–24	5–9 (2–3)	
		New Hampshire	W 33–30	6–9 (3–3)	
*		N.Y. State Teachers	W 29–20	7–9	
*Non-conference game. ^{#}Rankings from AP Poll. (#) Tournament seedings in parentheses. All times are in Eastern Time.

Schedule Source:
