= 1920–21 Holy Cross Crusaders men's basketball team =

American college basketball season

1920–21 Holy Cross Crusaders men's basketball
- Conference: Independent
- Record: 2–0
- Head coach: William J. Casey (1st season)
- Captain: none
- Home arena: N/A

The 1920–21 Holy Cross Crusaders men's basketball team represented The College of the Holy Cross during the 1908–09 college men's basketball season. The head coach was William Casey, coaching the crusaders in his first season.

== Schedule ==
Date time, TV	Opponent	Result	Record	Site city, state
3/05/1921*	at Boston College	W 28–26	1–0	Chestnut Hill, MA
3/11/1921*	Boston College	W 36–16	2–0	Worcester, MA
*Non-conference game. (#) Tournament seedings in parentheses.
