= 1920–21 Niagara Purple Eagles men's basketball team =

American college basketball season

1920–21 Niagara Purple Eagles men's basketball
- Conference: Independent
- Record: 11–4
- Head coach: John Blake (2nd season)

The 1920–21 Niagara Purple Eagles men's basketball team represented Niagara University during the 1920–21 NCAA college men's basketball season. The head coach was John Blake, coaching his second season with the Purple Eagles.

== Schedule ==
Date time, TV	Opponent	Result	Record	Site city, state
12/12/1920	Tuscarora Indians	W 72–20	1–0	Lewiston, NY
12/16/1920	Rochester Opt.	W 47–24	2–0	Lewiston, NY
1/06/1921	at Albany Law	W 26–18	3–0	
1/07/1921	at St. John's	W 36–19	4–0	Queens, NY
1/08/1921	at Cathedral College	W 44–28	5–0	
1/08/1921	at Crescent A.C.	L 17–33	5–1	
1/10/1921	at Seton Hall	W 48–46	6–1	South Orange, NJ
1/14/1921	at Allegheny	L 23–31	6–2	Meadville, PA
1/20/1921	Thiel	W 38–25	7–2	Lewiston, NY
1/22/1921	at Canisius	L 16–17	7–3	Buffalo, NY
2/05/1921	Detroit	W 37–15	8–3	Lewiston, NY
2/11/1921	Rochester Opt.	W 43–27	9–3	Lewiston, NY
2/22/1921	at Detroit	L 22–37	9–4	Detroit, MI
2/20/1921	St. John's	W 39–22	10–4	Lewiston, NY
2/27/1921	at St. Bonaventure	W 39–27	11–4	St. Bonaventure, NY
3/06/1921	Canisius	W 40–22	12–4	Lewiston, NY
3/13/1921	at St. Bonaventure	W 39–27	13–4	St. Bonaventure, NY
3/11/1921	Allegheny	W 28–17	14–4	Lewiston, NY
	Seton Hall	W 48–46	15–4	Lewiston, NY
*Non-conference game. (#) Tournament seedings in parentheses.
