= 1920–21 Washington State Cougars men's basketball team =

American college basketball season

1920–21 Washington State Cougars men's basketball
- Conference: Pacific Coast Conference
- Record: 12–16 (3–11 PCC)
- Head coach: Fred Bohler (13th season)

1920–21 Pacific Coast Conference men's basketball standings
	Conf.				Overall
Team	W		L	PCT	W		L	PCT
Stanford	8	–	3	.727	15	–	3	.833
California	8	–	3	.727	15	–	4	.789
Washington	10	–	4	.714	18	–	4	.818
Oregon	8	–	4	.667	15	–	5	.750
Washington State	3	–	11	.214	12	–	16	.429
Oregon Agricultural	2	–	14	.125	6	–	17	.261
As of 1921

The 1920–21 Washington State Cougars men's basketball team represented Washington State College for the 1920–21 college basketball season. Led by thirteenth-year head coach Fred Bohler, the Cougars were members of the Pacific Coast Conference and played their home games on campus in Pullman, Washington.

The Cougars were 12–16 overall in the regular season and 3–11 in conference play, fifth in the standings.
