= Willis O. Hunter =

American athletics coach and administrator (1892–1968)

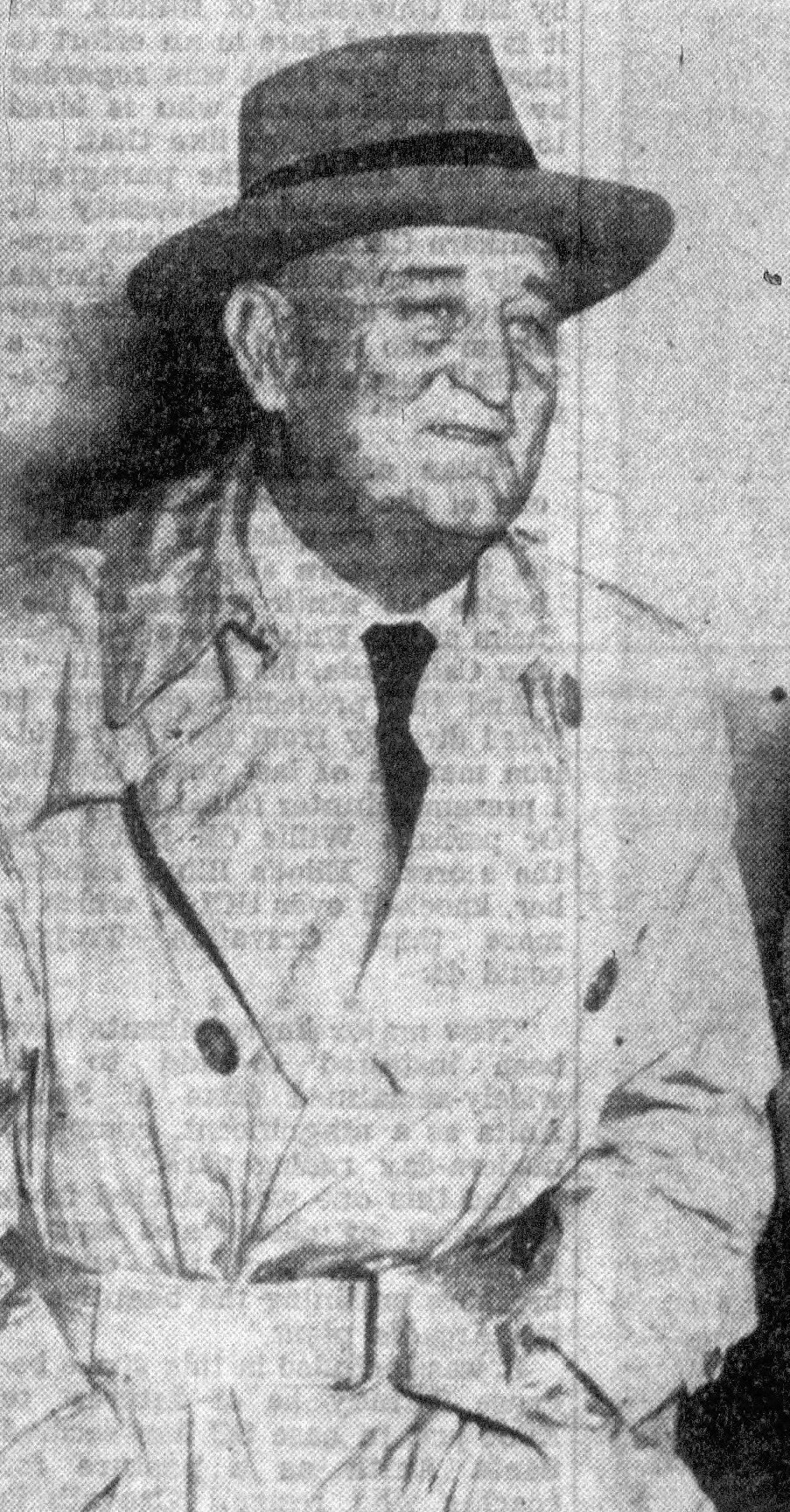
- Hunter, circa 1951

Biographical details
- Born: June 8, 1892; Mount Pleasant, Utah, U.S.
- Died: November 8, 1968 (aged 76); Altadena, California, U.S.

Playing career
- c. 1914: Oberlin
- Position: Fullback

Coaching career (HC unless noted)
- c. 1917: San Francisco Polytechnic HS (CA)
- 1919: USC (backfield)

Administrative career (AD unless noted)
- 1925–1957: USC

Willis Omenn Hunter (June 8, 1892 – November 8, 1968) was an American college athletics administrator.

Hunter was born in 1892 in Mount Pleasant, Utah. He attended Oberlin College in Ohio, where he played college football as a fullback.

After college, he became a coach at San Francisco Polytechnic High School. He was hired by the University of Southern California in 1919 as an assistant football coach. In 1925, he became USC's athletic director, a position he held for 32 years until 1957. During his tenure, the USC Trojans became a major power in intercollegiate sports, winning national championships in football, baseball, track, tennis, and other sports.

Hunter served on the NCAA's football rules committee from 1928 to 1950. He was also a member of the United States Olympic Committee in 1936, 1948, and 1952.

Hunter died in 1968.
