= 1913–14 Loyola Ramblers men's basketball team =

American college basketball season

1913–14 Loyola Ramblers men's basketball
- Conference: Independent
- Record: 0–2
- Head coach: unknown
- Home arena: none

The 1913–14 Loyola Ramblers men's basketball team represented Loyola University Chicago during the 1913–14 college men's basketball season. The team finished the season with an overall record of 0–2.

== Schedule ==
| Date time, TV | Opponent | Result | Record | Site city, state |
|---|---|---|---|---|
| February 7, 1914* | Loyola Academy | W 47-23 | 0–1 | Chicago, IL |
| February 10, 1914* | Loras | W 37-17 | 0–2 | Chicago, IL |
*Non-conference game. (#) Tournament seedings in parentheses.
