= George Buchheit =

American basketball coach (1898–1972)

- The Illio, 1920

Biographical details
- Born: March 22, 1898; Beardstown, Illinois, U.S.
- Died: May 24, 1972 (aged 74); Springfield, Illinois, U.S.

Playing career

Football
- 1918: Illinois
- Position: End

Coaching career (HC unless noted)

Football
- 1932–1935: Bloomsburg
- 1936: Bloomsburg (line)
- 1940–1941: Bloomsburg
- 1945: Bloomsburg

Basketball
- 1919–1924: Kentucky
- 1924–1928: Duke
- 1932–1943: Bloomsburg
- 1944–1946: Bloomsburg

Head coaching record
- Overall: 15–26–4 (football); 163–132 (basketball)

George Clifford Buchheit (March 22, 1898 – May 24, 1972) was an American college basketball coach. He was the head of the Kentucky Wildcats men's basketball team of the University of Kentucky from 1920 to 1924, where he compiled a 44–27 record. From 1924 to 1928, Buchheit was the head coach of the Duke Blue Devils men's basketball team of Duke University.

From 1932 to 1945, he was the head coach for the Bloomsburg University of Pennsylvania football team and compiled a 15–27–4 record.

Buchheit attended University of Illinois.

== Head coaching record ==
=== Football ===
Year	Team	Overall	Conference	Standing	Bowl/playoffs
Bloomsburg Maroon and Gold / Huskies (Independent) (1932–1933)
1932	Bloomsburg	1–3–2			
1933	Bloomsburg	2–5			
Bloomsburg Huskies (Pennsylvania State Teachers Conference) (1934–1935)
1934	Bloomsburg	4–3–1	4–3–1	6th	
1935	Bloomsburg	4–3–1	4–3–1	6th	
Bloomsburg Huskies (Pennsylvania State Teachers College Conference) (1940–1941)
1940	Bloomsburg	1–6	1–6	12th	
1941	Bloomsburg	1–4	1–4	11th	
Bloomsburg Huskies (Independent) (1945)
1945	Bloomsburg	2–2			
Bloomsburg:		15–26–4	10–16–2		
Total:		15–26–4			

=== Basketball ===
Record table
Season	Team	Overall	Conference	Standing	Postseason
Kentucky Wildcats (Southern Intercollegiate Athletic Association) (1919–1921)
1919–20	Kentucky	5–7	—	—	—
1920–21	Kentucky	13–1	—	—	—
Kentucky Wildcats (Southern Conference) (1921–1924)
1921–22	Kentucky	10–5	3–1	3rd	—
1922–23	Kentucky	3–10	0–5	18th	—
1923–24	Kentucky	13–3	6–2	5th	—
Kentucky:		44–27	9–8		
Duke Blue Devils (No Conference) (1924–1928)
1924–25	Duke	4–9	—	—	—
1925–26	Duke	8–12	—	—	—
1926–27	Duke	4–10	—	—	—
1927–28	Duke	9–5	—	—	—
Duke:		25–36			
Total:		69–63			
National champion Postseason invitational champion Conference regular season champion Conference regular season and conference tournament champion Division regular season champion Division regular season and conference tournament champion Conference tournament champion
