= 1920–21 William & Mary Indians men's basketball team =

American college basketball season

1920–21 William & Mary Indians men's basketball
- Conference: Independent
- Record: 8–3
- Head coach: James G. Driver (2nd season)

The 1920–21 William & Mary Indians men's basketball team represented the College of William & Mary in intercollegiate basketball during the 1920–21 season. Under the second year of head coach James G. Driver (who concurrently served as the head baseball coach), the team finished the season with an 8–3 record. This was the 15th season of the collegiate basketball program at William & Mary, whose nickname is now the Tribe.

== Schedule ==
Date time, TV	Rank^{#}	Opponent^{#}	Result	Record	Site city, state
Regular season
*		at Hampton Legion	W 41–22	1–0	Hampton, VA
*		at George Washington	L 32–40	1–1	Washington, DC
*		at Virginia	L 15–46	1–2	Charlottesville, VA
*		Parkview A.C. Ports	L 23–34	1–3	Williamsburg, VA
*		at Newport News YMCA	W 25–18	2–3	Newport News, VA
*		Randolph–Macon	W 53–26	3–3	Williamsburg, VA
*		Camp Eustis	W 41–17	4–3	Williamsburg, VA
2/12/1920*		Richmond	W 45–20	5–3	Williamsburg, VA
*		at Medical College of Virginia	W 45–20	6–3	Richmond, VA
*		at Randolph–Macon	W 28–14	7–3	Ashland, VA
2/22/1920*		at Richmond	W 38–23	8–3	Richmond, VA
*Non-conference game. ^{#}Rankings from AP Poll. (#) Tournament seedings in parentheses.
