= 1920–21 Loyola Ramblers men's basketball team =

American college basketball season

1920–21 Loyola Ramblers men's basketball
- Conference: Independent
- Record: 7–4
- Head coach: Bill Feeney (1st season)
- Home arena: none

The 1920–21 Loyola Ramblers men's basketball team represented Loyola University Chicago during the 1920–21 NCAA men's basketball season. The Ramblers were led by first-year head coach Bill Feeney. The team finished the season with an overall record of 7–4.

== Schedule ==
Date time, TV	Opponent	Result	Record	Site city, state
*	Crane College	L 10–25	1–0	Chicago, IL
*	Campion	W 32–15	1–1	Chicago, IL
*	Quigley Seminary	L 14–15	1–2	Chicago, IL
*	St. Bede	W 44–18	2–2	Chicago, IL
*	Northwestern Dental	W 30–21	3–2	Chicago, IL
*	Crane College	L 14–17	3–3	Chicago, IL
*	American College of PE	W 31–14	4–3	Chicago, IL
*	Cathedral College	W 29–8	5–3	Chicago, IL
*	Notre Dame Dental	W 31–21	6–3	Chicago, IL
*	St. Viator's	L 18–28	6–4	Chicago, IL
*	Hahnemann Medical	W 60–8	7–4	Chicago, IL
*Non-conference game. (#) Tournament seedings in parentheses.
