= 1920–21 Missouri Tigers men's basketball team =

American college basketball season

1920–21 Missouri Tigers men's basketball
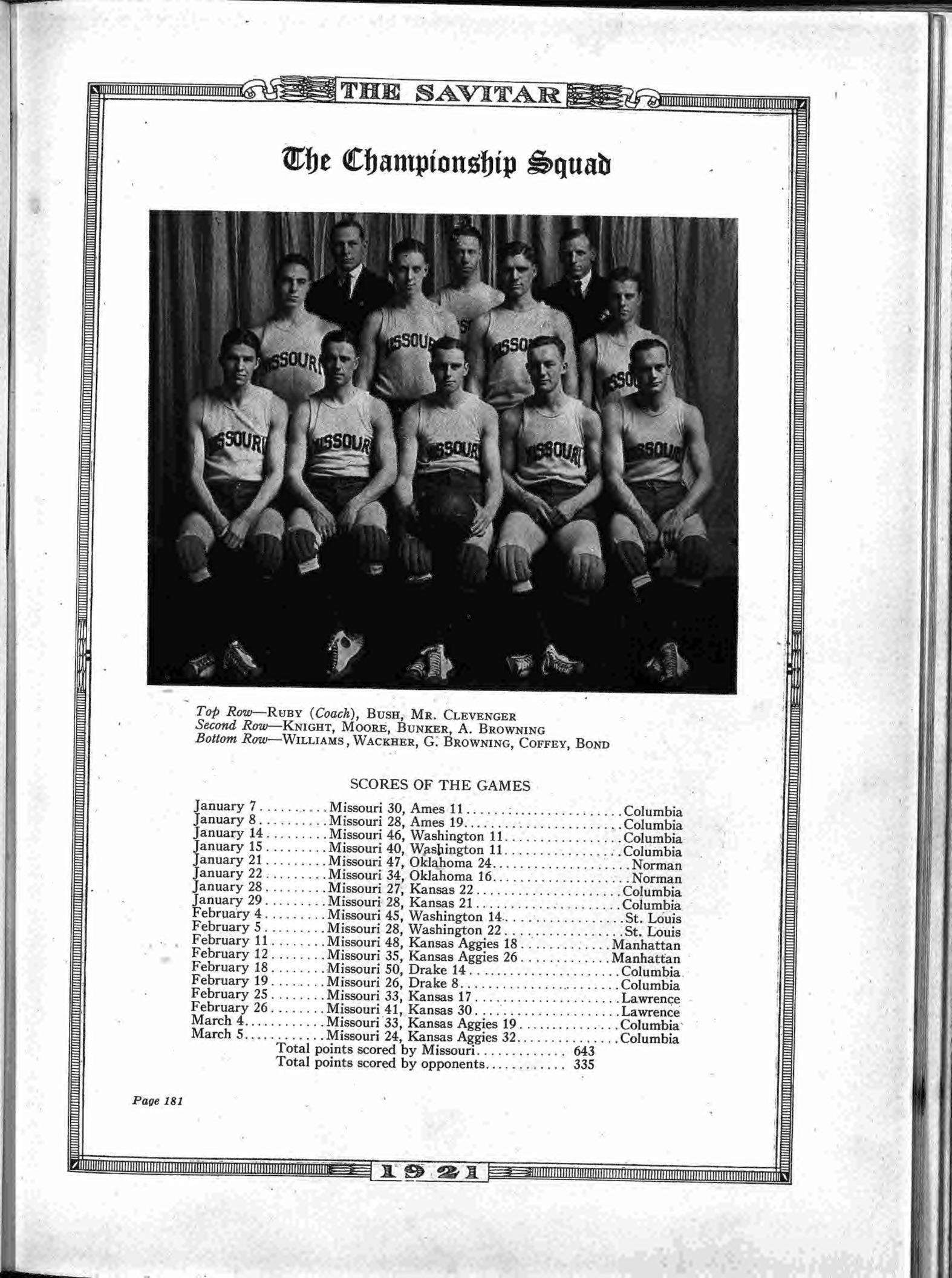
- Conference: Missouri Valley Conference
- Record: 17–1 (17–1 MVIAA)
- Head coach: J. Craig Ruby (1st season)

1920–21 Missouri Valley Intercollegiate Athletic Association men's basketball standings
	Conf.				Overall
Team	W		L	PCT	W		L	PCT
Missouri	17	–	1	.944	17	–	1	.944
Nebraska	9	–	1	.900	15	–	3	.833
Kansas State	11	–	4	.733	14	–	5	.737
Kansas	10	–	8	.556	10	–	8	.556
Iowa State	6	–	8	.429	10	–	8	.556
Oklahoma	5	–	9	.357	10	–	8	.556
Drake	5	–	8	.385	10	–	8	.556
Grinnell	2	–	12	.143	6	–	12	.333
Washington University	2	–	16	.111	3	–	17	.150

The 1920–21 Missouri Tigers men's basketball team represented the University of Missouri in intercollegiate basketball during the 1920–21 season. The team finished the season with a 17–1 record and was retroactively listed as the top team of the 1920–21 season by the Premo-Porretta Power Poll. It was head coach Craig Ruby's first season coaching the team.
