= Basil Hayden =

American basketball player and coach (1899–2003)

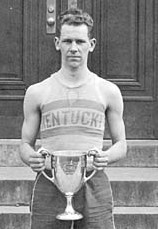
- Basil Hayden in 1921, after winning the Southern Intercollegiate Athletic Association Championships

Biographical details
- Born: May 19, 1899; Stanford, Kentucky, U.S.
- Died: January 9, 2003 (aged 103); Paris, Kentucky, U.S.

Playing career
- 1919–1922: Kentucky
- Position: Forward

Coaching career (HC unless noted)
- 1922–1923: Kentucky Wesleyan
- 1923–1926: George Rogers Clark HS
- 1926–1927: Kentucky

Head coaching record
- Overall: 11–14 (college only)

Accomplishments and honors

Championships
- SIAA (1921)

Awards
- All-American (1921)

Basil Ewing Hayden (May 19, 1899 – January 9, 2003) was an American college basketball player and coach. A Kentucky native, he began playing the sport in the sixth grade and, after a year at Transylvania University, transferred to the University of Kentucky to study chemistry and play on the school's basketball squad. He captained the team to victory at the Southern Intercollegiate Athletic Association Championship and was named an All-American for his efforts – the first basketball player to earn the honor at the University of Kentucky.

After graduating in 1922 Hayden took on a number of different jobs and was called to coach the University of Kentucky's basketball team in 1926 following the departure of Ray Eklund. After a 3–13 record in his first year he was replaced with John Mauer and returned to his previous occupations. When he died in 2003, at the age of 103, he was the University of Kentucky's oldest former athlete, and his jersey is among those hung in the school's Rupp Arena.

== Early life ==
Hayden was born in Stanford, Kentucky; his father Joseph was a grocer, and his mother Annie (née: Brown) was a tutor. He moved to Paris, Kentucky at an early age and began playing basketball in the sixth grade, which he continued upon entering Paris High School. He was drafted into the United States Army during World War I, but the conflict ended before he was shipped out. He entered Transylvania University in 1918, intending to become a minister, but switched to the University of Kentucky the following year to study industrial chemistry. While there, he played tennis and competed in the javelin throw, setting a school record.

== Basketball career ==
Hayden joined the school's basketball team for the 1919–1920 season and was the squad's leading scorer with 133 points in 12 games, leading to an average of 11.8 points per game; no other player on the team scored more than 56 points or had an average greater than 7. While he slipped to 9.71 points per game the following year (and finished second in both points and average to rookie William King), he found success captaining the team to the Southern Intercollegiate Athletic Association Championship – the University of Kentucky's first victory at a major basketball tournament. He was named an All-American in 1921, the first University of Kentucky basketball player to be so honored. He also had his highest-scoring game ever that season, scoring 20 points against Georgetown College. He injured his knee in the high jump prior to his final 1921–1922 season but still finished with an average of 4.92 points per game, the third best average on the team that season and the fourth highest number of points. At the peak of his playing career he was 5'11", weighed 165 pounds, and was nicknamed "The Blond Adonis". His overall career statistics saw him amass 333 points in 39 games – an average of about 8.5 points per game.

After his graduation Hayden moved to Detroit to work for Dodge but returned to Kentucky after the first summer because of homesickness. During the 1922–23 basketball season he coached at Kentucky Wesleyan College which was in Winchester at the time. In his one season at Kentucky Wesleyan he went 8–1. He then taught and coached at George Rogers Clark High School while taking a job in the insurance business in Richmond, Kentucky. In 1926 he was called to replace Ray Eklund as the head basketball coach at the University of Kentucky but was given only one week to prepare for the task with a team made up of unskilled members. The squad consisted primarily of football players, many of whom lacked the incentive to fully participate. The team finished with a 3–13 record, winning once against the University of Florida and twice against Centre College. When Harry Gamage was named the new head coach of the university's football squad, he had Hayden replaced with John Mauer. The team would not have another losing season until 1988–89 under Eddie Sutton.

== Later life ==
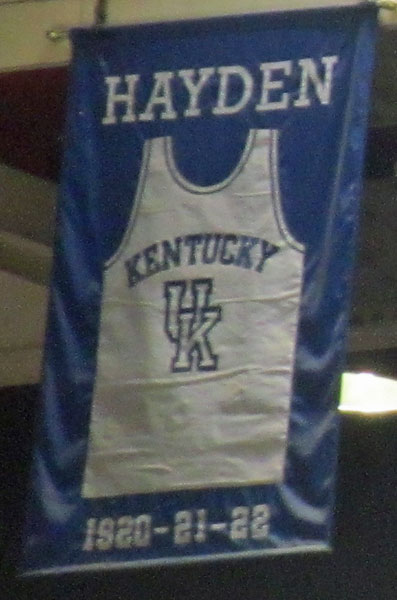
A jersey honoring Hayden hangs in Rupp Arena.

After his experiment with coaching, Hayden went returned to the insurance business and also worked as a banker, accountant, a hospital administrator, school teacher, and Kentucky state bank inspector. He also worked as the treasurer of a Methodist church until his mid-70s. He was a lifetime member of Rotary International and the Kappa Sigma fraternity. He was married to Mary Hardin for 67 years until her death; he would remarry to Edna Lytle. At the time of his death on January 9, 2003, at the age of 103, his jersey was one of 41 retired jerseys hanging in Rupp Arena, (with his name only, as the jerseys did not have numbers during his era), and he was the oldest living former University of Kentucky athlete. As of 2009, he is the only one of the 49 University of Kentucky basketball All-Americans to have been born in the 19th century, as well as probably being the shortest. He is a member of the Paris High School Greyhound Hall of Fame.

== Head coaching record ==
=== Basketball ===
Record table
Season	Team	Overall	Conference	Standing	Postseason
Kentucky Wesleyan Panthers (Independent) (1922–1923)
1922–23	Kentucky Wesleyan	8–1			
Kentucky Wesleyan:		8–1			
Kentucky Wildcats (Southern Conference) (1926–1927)
1926–27	Kentucky	3–13	1–6	18th	
Kentucky:		3–13	1–6		
Total:		11–14			
