= 1923 Michigan Agricultural Aggies football team =

American college football season

1923 Michigan Agricultural Aggies football
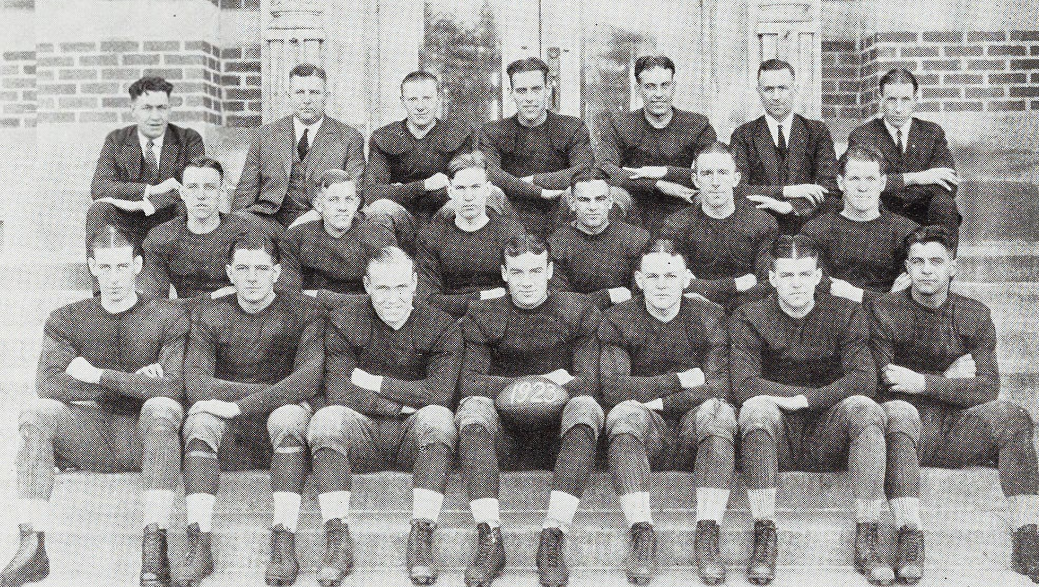
- Conference: Independent
- Record: 3–5
- Head coach: Ralph H. Young (1st season)
- Captain: Maurice Taylor
- Home stadium: Aggie Stadium

1923 Midwestern college football independents records
	Conf.			Overall
Team	W	L	T	W		L		T
Marquette		–		8	–	0	–	0
Michigan Mines		–		2	–	0	–	0
Notre Dame		–		9	–	1	–	0
Western State Normal		–		6	–	1	–	1
Haskell		–		11	–	2	–	1
Butler		–		7	–	2	–	0
Central Michigan		–		5	–	1	–	2
Baldwin–Wallace		–		5	–	2	–	1
Cincinnati		–		6	–	3	–	0
Loyola (IL)		–		6	–	3	–	0
Saint Louis		–		5	–	3	–	1
Detroit		–		4	–	3	–	2
Wabash		–		4	–	3	–	2
John Carroll		–		4	–	4	–	1
Valparaiso		–		2	–	2	–	1
Dayton		–		4	–	5	–	0
Michigan Agricultural		–		3	–	5	–	0
Fairmount		–		2	–	4	–	2
Kent State		–		0	–	5	–	0

The 1923 Michigan Agricultural Aggies football team was an American football team that represented Michigan Agricultural College (MAC), now known as Michigan State University, as an independent during the 1923 college football season. In their first year under head coach Ralph H. Young, the Aggies compiled a 3–5 record and were outscored by a total of 144 to 56. It was the Aggies' 28th season of intercollegiate football.

MAC opened its season with a 34–0 loss to Amos Alonzo Stagg's Chicago Maroons. The Aggies also suffered one-sided losses to Wisconsin (21–0), rival Michigan (37–0), and Creighton (27–7). The team's only victories were in games with Lake Forest (21–6), Albion (13–0), and Detroit (2–0). After the victory over Detroit in the final game of the season, MAC's students were criticized for their "deplorable" actions as "an ordinary mob" resulting in the destruction of private property and a "battle with the police." The Lansing State Journal wrote that the students needed "a good spanking."

Key players included end Ray "Stub" Kipke, the younger brother of Michigan's All-American halfback Harry Kipke, and quarterback Roland Richards.

MAC played its games in a new, but not fully completed, concrete Aggie Stadium with a seating capacity of 16,000 for the 1923 season. The stadium was officially dedicated in 1924.

== Schedule ==
Date	Opponent	Site	Result	Attendance	Source
September 29	at Chicago	Stagg Field; Chicago, IL	L 0–34	22,000	
October 6	Lake Forest	Aggie Stadium; East Lansing, MI	W 21–6	>8,000	
October 13	at Wisconsin	Camp Randall Stadium; Madison, WI	L 0–21		
October 20	Albion	Aggie Stadium; East Lansing, MI	W 13–0		
October 27	at Michigan	Ferry Field; Ann Arbor, MI (rivalry)	L 0–37		
November 3	Ohio Wesleyan	Aggie Stadium; East Lansing, MI	L 14–19		
November 10	Creighton^{†}	Aggie Stadium; East Lansing, MI	L 7–27		
November 17	at Detroit	University of Detroit Stadium; Detroit, MI	W 2–0		
^{†}Homecoming

== Before the season ==
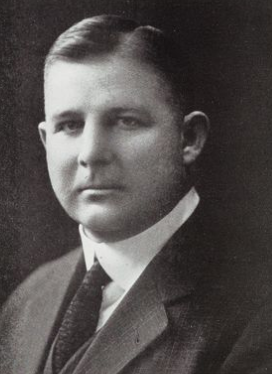
Newly hired head coach, Ralph H. Young

With dissatisfaction among MAC alumni after the football team went 6–10–2 between 1921 and 1922, head coach Albert Barron stepped down after the 1922 season. Ralph H. Young was hired as both athletic director and head coach of the school's major sports, including football, with his duties set to commence on September 1. (Note: Barron had served as acting athletic director following Chester Brewer's resignation.) Young came to MAC following a successful tenure of six years (combined) (Note: Young coached at Kalamazoo from 1916 to 1917 and from 1919 to 1922.) at Kalamazoo College. He led Kalamazoo's football team to an overall record of 33–16–2 and won three Michigan Intercollegiate Athletic Association (MIAA) championships. He also briefly served as the head football coach for DePauw in 1915, giving him a combined overall record of 38–19–2.

Young's first staff move was to hire former All-Western Ohio State guard Tarzan Taylor as the school's line coach. Taylor had just finished winning back-to-back APFA/NFL championships with the Chicago Staleys and Canton Bulldogs, respectively. Young also retained renowned football, basketball, and baseball coach Mysterious Walker to be the team's freshman coach, after spending the previous season as the team's backfield coach. Former MAC star fullback George E. Julian offered to unofficially look over the backfield.

Michigan Agricultural played its previous 23 seasons at Old College Field, but prior to the 1923 season, construction began on a new $160,000 stadium. The stadium was temporarily referred to as Aggie Stadium before being dedicated in 1924 as College Field. The stadium was only partially completed upon the team's home-opener on October 6 but was still able to hold 16,000 people.

== Game summaries ==
=== Chicago ===
Week 1: Michigan Agricultural at Chicago

Team	1	2	3	4	Total
Michigan Agricultural	0	0	0	0	0
• Chicago	14	5	0	14	33

- Date: September 29
- Location: Stagg Field
  Chicago, IL
- Game attendance: 22,000
- Referee: Horatio B. Hackett (Army)

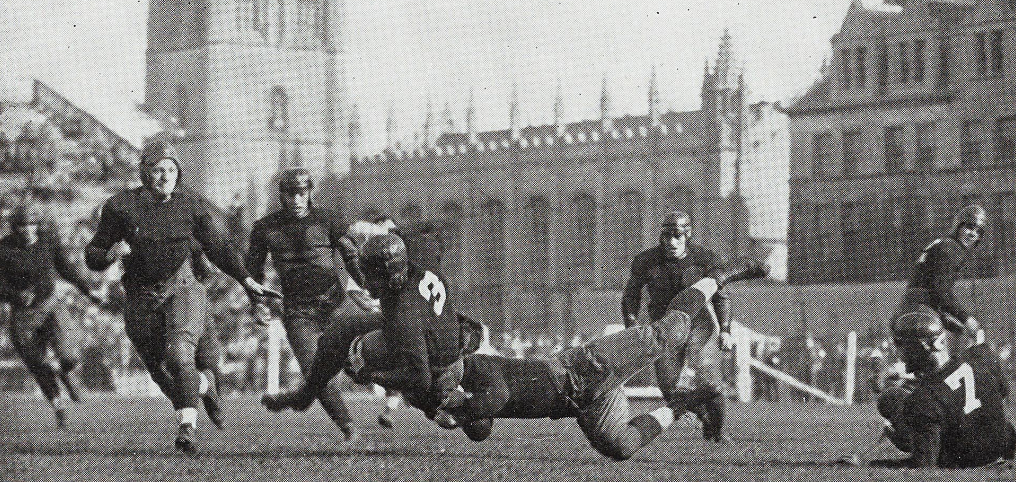
Chicago's Bill Zorn being tackled during the team's game

Michigan Agricultural opened its 1923 season against the University of Chicago at Stagg Field, and lost to the Maroons 34–0 in what was Ralph H. Young's first game as head coach of the Aggies. In a game dominated by Chicago in every aspect, Michigan Agricultural did not score a single point throughout the entire game.

The Maroons throttled the Aggies with two 20-yard touchdown passes in the first quarter. The dominance continued throughout the game as Chicago captain Jimmy Pyott scored following a fumble by the Aggies. End Campbell Dickson paved the way for the Chicago victory as he scored three of the team's five touchdowns. Michigan Agricultural did not complete a single pass, as their one completion was called back for an offsides penalty, while also throwing three interceptions.

The starting lineup was Ray Kipke (left end), Vivian Hultman (left tackle), Donald Haskins (left guard), Harold Eckerman (center), Maurice Taylor (right guard), Edward Eckert (right tackle), Allen Edmunds (right end) Roland Richards (quarterback), Elton Neller (Note: Incorrectly spelt as Keller in some sources.) (left halfback), Vern Schmyser (right halfback), Ernest Lioret (fullback).

=== Lake Forest ===
Week 2: Lake Forest at Michigan Agricultural

Team	1	2	3	4	Total
Lake Forest	0	0	6	0	6
• Michigan Agricultural	14	7	0	0	21

- Date: October 6
- Location: Aggie Stadium
  East Lansing, MI
- Game attendance: >8,000
- Referee: Ray (Illinois)

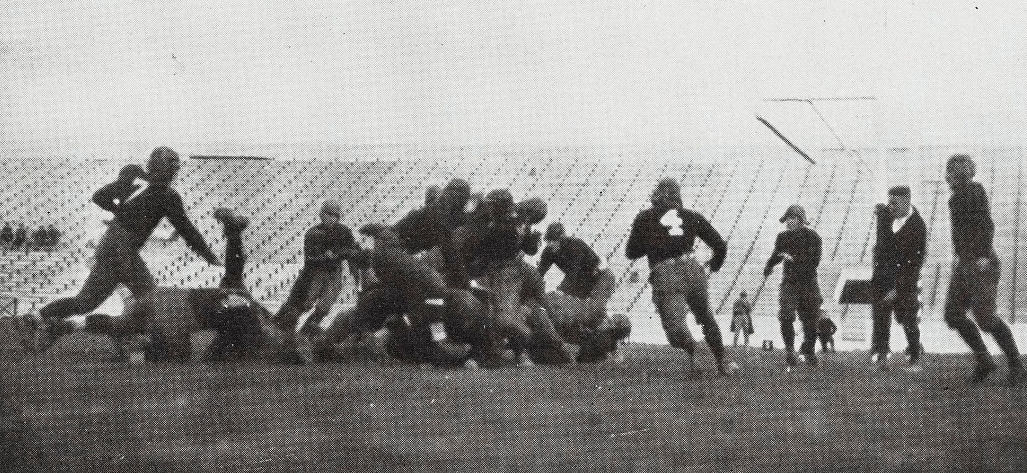
Photo from the game against Lake Forest

On October 6, MAC defeated the team from Lake Forest College, 21–6, in the first game played at the newly-constructed Aggie Stadium. In the first quarter, the Aggies faked a kick from the 30-yard line, Roland Richards throwing a touchdown pass to Ray Kipke in the end zone. On the next play after the kickoff, Kipke ran for 40 yards to the Lake Forest five-yard line. Vern Schmyser then ran for the touchdown. The Aggies scored their third touchdown in the second quarter on a 25-yard touchdown pass from Richards to Kipke. Lake Forest scored its points in the third quarter on a 60-yard drive capped with a touchdown run by Bell.

The starting lineup was Ray Kipke (left end), Maurice Taylor (left tackle), Vivian Hultman (left guard), Harold Eckerman (center), Paul Hackett (right guard), Donald Haskins (right tackle), (Note: Incorrectly referred to as Hasken in some sources.) Allen Edmunds (right end), Roland Richards (quarterback), Elton Neller (left halfback), Vern Schmyser (right halfback), Ernest Lioret (fullback).

=== Wisconsin ===
Week 3: Michigan Agricultural at Wisconsin

Team	1	2	3	4	Total
Michigan Agricultural	0	0	0	0	0
• Wisconsin	0	7	0	14	21

- Date: October 13
- Location: Camp Randall Stadium
  Madison, WI
- Referee: W. D. Knight (Dartmouth)

Prior to the game, MAC captain Maurice Taylor was ruled out for the game due to a leg injury he had suffered prior to the season.

On October 13, MAC lost to Wisconsin, 21–0, at Camp Randall Stadium in Madison, Wisconsin. On their opening possession, the Aggies drove to Wiconsin's five-yard line but failed to score. MAC quarterback Roland Richards was injured in the first quarter and did not return to the game. The Aggies managed only four first downs in the game. Wisconsin's first touchdown followed a muffed punt by Hultman from the end zone, the ball going out of bounds at MAC's 15-yeard line.

=== Albion ===
Week 4: Albion at Michigan Agricultural

Team	1	2	3	4	Total
Albion	0	0	0	0	0
• Michigan Agricultural	0	0	7	6	13

- Date: October 20
- Location: Aggie Stadium
  East Lansing, MI
- Referee: Costello (Georgetown)

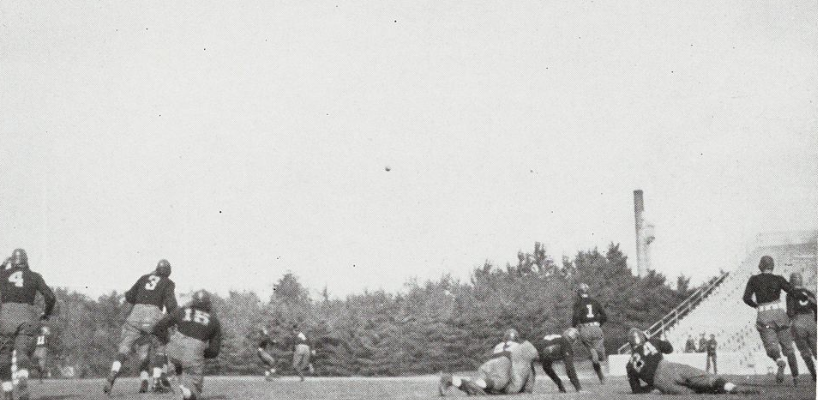
Albion punting

On October 20, MAC defeated the team from Albion College, 13–0, in the second game played at the new Aggie Stadium. The Aggies scored both of its touchdowns after blocking Albion punts. After a scoreless first half, Robinson blocked an Albion punt in the third quarter, and Ray Kipke recovered the ball on Albion's 27-yard line. On the next play, Roland Richards threw a touchdown pass to Hugh Robinson. In the fourth quarter, Vivian Hultman blocked the second punt and recovered the ball at the 33-yard line. Vern Schmyser scored on a short run.

The starting lineup was Ray Kipke (left end), Edward Eckert (left tackle), Vivian Hultman (left guard), Harold Eckerman (center), Maurice Taylor (right guard), Donald Haskins (right tackle), Allen Edmunds (right end), (Note: Incorrectly spelt as Edmonds in some sources.) Boeheringer (quarterback), (Note: Listed as the starter, but is not mentioned in the 1924 Wolverine Yearbook.) Vern Schmyser (left halfback), Arthur Beckley (right halfback), Elton Neller (fullback).

=== Michigan ===
Week 5: Michigan Agricultural at Michigan

Team	1	2	3	4	Total
Michigan Agricultural	0	0	0	0	0
• Michigan	24	6	7	0	37

- Date: October 27
- Location: Ferry Field
  Ann Arbor, MI
- Referee: Harry Costello

Leading up to the team's rivalry game, captain Maurice Taylor returned to his position as a tackle after being moved into the guard spot while nursing his leg injury. Edward Eckert, who started at tackle in Taylor's place, was hospitalized before the game due to an illness.

On October 27, 1923, the Aggies lost to Michigan, 37–0, at Ferry Field. Harry Kipke's "broken field running figured prominently in Michigan's scoring." Richard Vick started in place of Herb Steger, who was held in reserve for the Iowa game the following week. A newspaper account of the game reported that Vick "played brilliantly, plunging and passing for repeated gains," revealing "a wealth of strength among the Michigan reserves." The 1924 Michiganensian reported that the Aggies "furnished a good practice game" and noted the every player on the Michigan bench was able to play in the game.

=== Ohio Wesleyan ===
Week 6: Ohio Wesleyan at Michigan Agricultural

Team	1	2	3	4	Total
• Ohio Wesleyan	3	13	0	3	19
Michigan Agricultural	0	0	7	7	14

- Date: November 3
- Location: Aggie Stadium
  East Lansing, MI
- Referee: Nichols (Oberlin)

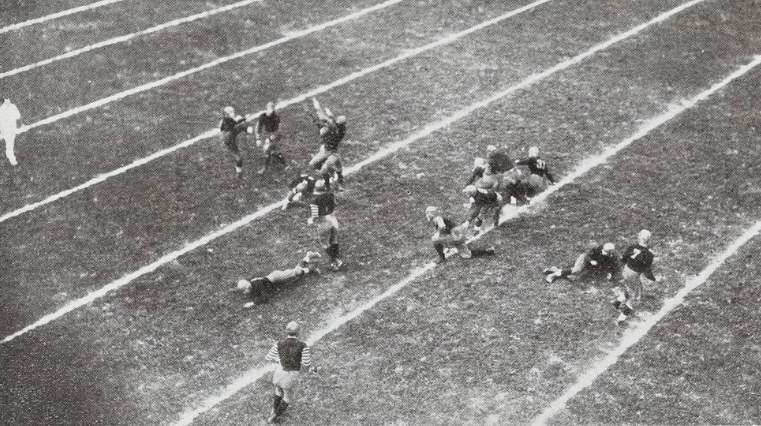
Punter Arthur Beckley punting against Ohio Wesleyan

On November 3, MAC lost to Ohio Wesleyan, 19–14. Two of MAC's starters, Hugh Robinson and Edward Eckert, missed the game due to illness. The Battling Bishops jumped to a 16–0 lead at halftime. The Aggies battled back with two second-half touchdown receptions by Ray Kipke.

The starters for MAC were Ray Kipke (left end), Spikeman (left tackle), M. Taylor (left guard), Eckerman (center), Hultman (right tackle), Hasking (right tackle), Edmonds (right end), Lyman (quarterback), Neller (left halfback), Schmyser (right halfback), and Beckley (fullback).

=== Creighton ===
Week 7: Creighton at Michigan Agricultural

Team	1	2	3	4	Total
• Creighton	13	7	0	7	27
Michigan Agricultural	0	0	0	6	6

- Date: November 10
- Location: Aggie Stadium
  East Lansing, MI
- Referee: Ray (Illinois)

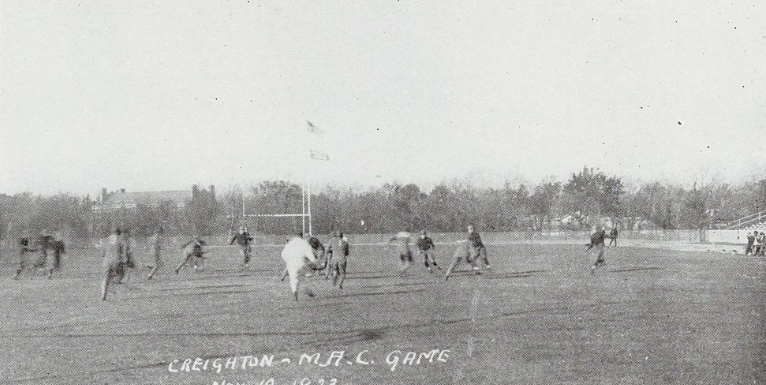
Creighton kicking off to MAC during the team's homecoming game

On November 10, MAC lost to Creighton, 27–6, spoiling the Aggies' homecoming celebration at Aggie Stadium. Creighton's backs intercepted five passes in the game. Creighton scored twice in the first quarter, the second touchdown being scored on a 35-yard interception return. In the third quarter, the Aggies drove 67 yards for a touchdown, Roland Richards scoring on a short run. In the fourth quarter, Creighton returned an interception 40 yards for a touchdown to seal the victory.

MAC starting lineup in the game was Ray Kipke (left end), Roy Spiekerman (left tackle), Vivian Hultman (left guard), Harold Eckerman (center), Maurice Taylor (right guard), Donald Haskins (right tackle), Allen Edmonds (right end), Roland Richards (quarterback), Arthur Beckley (left halfback), Vern Schmyser (right halfback), and Elton Neller (fullback).

=== Detroit ===
Week 8: Michigan Agricultural at Detroit

Team	1	2	3	4	Total
• Michigan Agricultural	2	0	0	0	2
Detroit	0	0	0	0	0

- Date: November 17
- Location: University of Detroit Stadium
  Detroit, MI
- Referee: E. C. Eldridge (Michigan)

On November 17, MAC concluded its season with a 2–0 victory over the Detroit Titans in Detroit. The Aggies scored off Detroit's first possession. On fourth down, Detroit tried to kick, but the pass from center went over Barrett's head and into the end zone. Barrett picked up the ball and tried to run, but he was tackled behind the goal line for a safety. Neither team was able to score any points on offense.

Throughout the game, Detroit struggled to even pass the 50-yard line as MAC's punter, Arthur Beckley, routinely pinned the team deep in its own territory.

After the victory, MAC's students were criticized for their "deplorable" actions as "an ordinary mob" resulting in the destruction of private property and a "battle with the police." The Lansing State Journal wrote that the students needed "a good spanking."

== Personnel ==
=== Roster ===
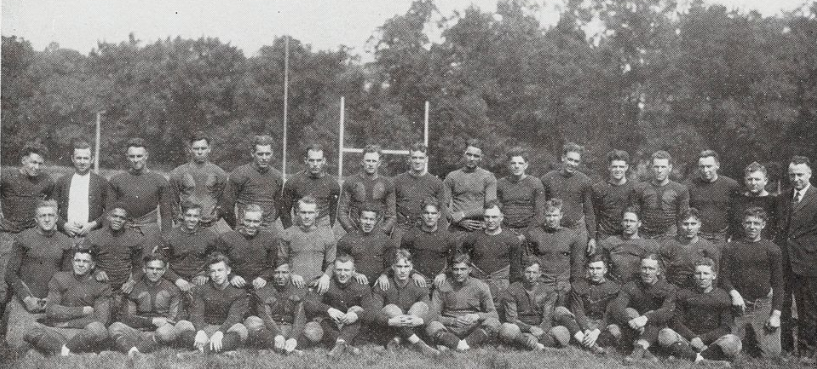
The full team during September training

Michigan Agricultural Aggies 1923 roster
Guards: Vivian Hultman; Paul Hackett; Tackles: Maurice Taylor (C); Edward Eckert; Roy Spickerman; Donald Haskins	Center: Harold Eckerman; Ends: Allen Edmunds; Ray Kipke; Hugh Robinson	Backs: Elton Neller; Ernest Lioret; Arthur Beckley; Roland Richards; Vern Schmyser; Richard Lyman

=== Coaching staff ===
Name	Position	Seasons at Michigan Agricultural	Alma Mater
Ralph H. Young	Head coach	1	Washington & Jefferson College
Tarzan Taylor	Line coach	1	Ohio State (1921)
Mysterious Walker	Freshmen coach	2	Chicago (1907)
C. D. Miller	Manager		
Jack Heppinstall	Trainer		
George E. Julian	Backfield coach (unofficial)	1	Michigan Agricultural (1915)

== Freshmen team ==
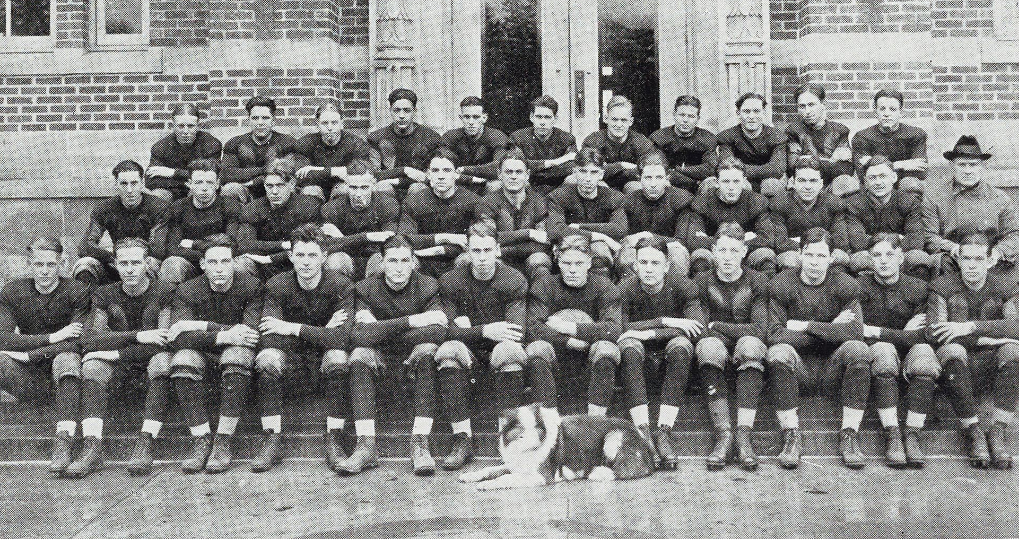
1923 Michigan Agricultural Aggies freshman team

The freshman team played a three-game schedule and finished with an overall record of 2–1. The team began their season losing to Grand Rapids Junior College, 20–0, before beating the Assumption College of the University of Western Ontario, 13–6, and Highland Park Junior College, 37–6. The team was coached by Mysterious Walker and fullback E. A. Juhl was the captain.

=== Roster ===
Michigan Agricultural Aggies 1923 freshman roster
Guards: G. R. Smith; C. L. Cole (Note: Also played as an end.); C. E. Gerdel; E. A. Wenner; Tackles: G. C. Pierce; F. Card	Center: J. W. Slaughter; C. E. Keefer; Ends: C. Fredericks; Ivan Collett; O. B. Evans; T. L. Sherburne	Backs: E. A. Juhl (C); J. A. Hands; M. L. Schultz; Hugh Hart; W. H. Snyder; L. E. Laubaugh; L. M. Wolfinger; C. E. Limpert; Bohn Grim
