= 1923 Central Michigan Normalites football team =

American college football season

1923 Central Michigan Normalites football
- Conference: Independent
- Record: 5–1–2
- Head coach: Wallace Parker (3rd season)

1923 Midwestern college football independents records
| | Conf. | | | Overall |
| Team | W | L | T | W | | L | | T |
|---|---|---|---|---|---|---|---|---|
| Marquette | | – | | 8 | – | 0 | – | 0 |
| Michigan Mines | | – | | 2 | – | 0 | – | 0 |
| Notre Dame | | – | | 9 | – | 1 | – | 0 |
| Western State Normal | | – | | 6 | – | 1 | – | 1 |
| Haskell | | – | | 11 | – | 2 | – | 1 |
| Butler | | – | | 7 | – | 2 | – | 0 |
| Central Michigan | | – | | 5 | – | 1 | – | 2 |
| Baldwin–Wallace | | – | | 5 | – | 2 | – | 1 |
| Cincinnati | | – | | 6 | – | 3 | – | 0 |
| Loyola (IL) | | – | | 6 | – | 3 | – | 0 |
| Saint Louis | | – | | 5 | – | 3 | – | 1 |
| Detroit | | – | | 4 | – | 3 | – | 2 |
| Wabash | | – | | 4 | – | 3 | – | 2 |
| John Carroll | | – | | 4 | – | 4 | – | 1 |
| Valparaiso | | – | | 2 | – | 2 | – | 1 |
| Dayton | | – | | 4 | – | 5 | – | 0 |
| Michigan Agricultural | | – | | 3 | – | 5 | – | 0 |
| Fairmount | | – | | 2 | – | 4 | – | 2 |
| Kent State | | – | | 0 | – | 5 | – | 0 |

The 1923 Central Michigan Normalites football team represented Central Michigan Normal School, later renamed Central Michigan University, as an independent during the 1923 college football season. In their third season under head coach Wallace Parker, the Central Michigan football team compiled a 5–1–2 record, shut out five of eight opponents, and outscored all opponents by a combined total of 160 to 24. The team's sole loss was to Albion by a 14–7 score.

== Schedule ==
| Date | Opponent | Site | Result |
|---|---|---|---|
| October 5 | Bay City Junior College | Mount Pleasant, MI | W 37–0 |
| October 13 | at Albion | Albion, MI | L 7–14 |
| October 20 | at Grand Rapids | Grand Rapids, MI | T 0–0 |
| October 27 | Michigan State Normal | Mount Pleasant, MI (rivalry) | W 27–3 |
| November 10 | at Northern State Teachers | Marquette, MI | W 34–0 |
| November 17 | Olivet | Mount Pleasant, MI | W 34–0 |
| November 24 | at Alma | Alma, MI | T 0–0 |
| November 29 | at Detroit City College | Detroit, Michigan | W 21–7 |
