= 1923 Western State Normal Hilltoppers football team =

American college football season

1923 Western State Normal Hilltoppers football
- Conference: Independent
- Record: 6–1–1
- Head coach: Milton Olander (2nd season)
- Captain: Harry Potter
- Home stadium: Normal field

1923 Midwestern college football independents records
	Conf.			Overall
Team	W	L	T	W		L		T
Marquette		–		8	–	0	–	0
Michigan Mines		–		2	–	0	–	0
Notre Dame		–		9	–	1	–	0
Western State Normal		–		6	–	1	–	1
Haskell		–		11	–	2	–	1
Butler		–		7	–	2	–	0
Central Michigan		–		5	–	1	–	2
Baldwin–Wallace		–		5	–	2	–	1
Cincinnati		–		6	–	3	–	0
Loyola (IL)		–		6	–	3	–	0
Saint Louis		–		5	–	3	–	1
Detroit		–		4	–	3	–	2
Wabash		–		4	–	3	–	2
John Carroll		–		4	–	4	–	1
Valparaiso		–		2	–	2	–	1
Dayton		–		4	–	5	–	0
Michigan Agricultural		–		3	–	5	–	0
Fairmount		–		2	–	4	–	2
Kent State		–		0	–	5	–	0

The 1923 Western State Normal Hilltoppers football team represented Western State Normal School (later renamed Western Michigan University) as an independent during the 1923 college football season. In their second and final season under head coach Milton Olander, the Hilltoppers compiled a 6–1–1 record and outscored their opponents, 160 to 21. Halfback Harry Potter was the team captain.

== Schedule ==
Date	Time	Opponent	Site	Result	Attendance	Source
September 29	2:15 p.m.	Notre Dame freshmen	Normal field; Kalamazoo, MI	W 15–0		
October 6	2:45 p.m.	Valparaiso	Normal field; Kalamazoo, MI	W 6–0		
October 11	3:00 p.m.	Alma	Normal field; Kalamazoo, MI	W 21–7	6,000	
October 19		at St. Viator	Bourbonnais, IL	T 7–7		
October 27		at Western Kentucky State Normal	Bowling Green, KY	W 26–0		
November 10	2:00 p.m.	Earlham^{†}	Normal field; Kalamazoo, MI	W 46–0		
November 17	2:00 p.m.	Chicago YMCA College	Normal field; Kalamazoo, MI	W 32–0		
November 29		at Albion	Alumni Field; Albion, MI	L 6–7		
^{†}Homecoming; All times are in Central time
