= 1923 Marquette Golden Avalanche football team =

American college football season

1923 Marquette Golden Avalanche football
- Conference: Independent
- Record: 8–0
- Head coach: Frank Murray (2nd season)

1923 Midwestern college football independents records
	Conf.			Overall
Team	W	L	T	W		L		T
Marquette		–		8	–	0	–	0
Michigan Mines		–		2	–	0	–	0
Notre Dame		–		9	–	1	–	0
Western State Normal		–		6	–	1	–	1
Haskell		–		11	–	2	–	1
Butler		–		7	–	2	–	0
Central Michigan		–		5	–	1	–	2
Baldwin–Wallace		–		5	–	2	–	1
Cincinnati		–		6	–	3	–	0
Loyola (IL)		–		6	–	3	–	0
Saint Louis		–		5	–	3	–	1
Detroit		–		4	–	3	–	2
Wabash		–		4	–	3	–	2
John Carroll		–		4	–	4	–	1
Valparaiso		–		2	–	2	–	1
Dayton		–		4	–	5	–	0
Michigan Agricultural		–		3	–	5	–	0
Fairmount		–		2	–	4	–	2
Kent State		–		0	–	5	–	0

The 1923 Marquette Golden Avalanche football team was an American football team that represented Marquette University as an independent during the 1923 college football season. In its second season under head coach Frank Murray, the team compiled an 8–0 record, shut out six of eight opponents, and outscored all opponents by a total of 162 to 12. It was Marquette's second consecutive undefeated season. During the combined 1922 and 1923 seasons, Marquette had a 16-0-1 record and shutout 13 of 16 opponents, giving up only 15 points.

Quarterback Red Dunn was the team's leader. He later played eight years in the National Football League and led the Chicago Cardinals and Green Bay Packers to NFL championships in 1925, 1929, 1930, and 1931.

== Schedule ==
Date	Time	Opponent	Site	Result	Attendance	Source
October 6		Saint Mary's (MN)	Milwaukee, WI	W 33–0		
October 13		Ripon	Milwaukee, WI	W 31–0		
October 20		Carroll (WI)	Milwaukee, WI	W 16–0		
October 27	1:00 p.m.	at Boston College	Braves Field; Boston, MA	W 7–6		
November 3		at Detroit	Dinan Field; Detroit, MI	W 18–6	12,000	
November 10		North Dakota	Milwaukee, WI	W 24–0		
November 17		South Dakota State	Milwaukee, WI	W 13–0		
November 29		Vermont	Milwaukee, WI	W 20–0		
All times are in Central time

== Game summaries ==
=== Marquette ===
On October 6, Marquette opened its season with a 33–0 victory over Saint Mary's College of Winona, Minnesota. Marquette started only four of its regulars. Quarterback and team captain Red Dunn scored 20 points on three touchdowns and two kicks for points after touchdown.

=== Ripon ===
On October 13, Marquette defeated Ripon College of Ripon, Wisconsin, by a 31–0 score in a game played on Marquette's field in Milwaukee. The Marquette defense was described as "a stone wall", preventing Ripon from making a single first down. Marquette backs Red Dunn and Leichtfuss made extensive gains. Dunn scored a touchdown and kicked four extra points. Additional touchdowns were scored by Duford, Skemp, and Dilwig. Ripon had previously played to scoreless ties in both 1921 and 1922.

=== Carroll ===
On October 20, Marquette shut out the team from Carroll College of Waukesha, Wisconsin, by a 16–0 score in a game played on Marquette's field in Milwaukee.

=== Boston College ===
On October 27, Marquette defeated Boston College, 7–6, at Braves Field in Boston. Quarterback Red Dunn sustained a break in his left arm at the elbow early in the game. He then returned to the game in the second half with his arm in a cast and led Marquette to victory. Both teams scored a touchdown. Marquette's touchdown came after Kennedy recovered a fumble on the three-yard line. Leichtfuss scored the touchdown, and Dunn kicked the extra point that proved to be the difference in the game. It was the first time a team from Wisconsin won a football game in the East.

=== Detroit ===
On November 3, Marquette defeated the University of Detroit Titans, 18–6, before 12,000 spectators in Detroit. Marquette scored "by every method known to football", including a touchdown pass in the first quarter, a field goal in the second quarter, a rushing touchdown in the third quarter, and a safety in the fourth quarter. Detroit's points were scored shortly before halftime on an 85-yard run by halfback Bill Brett. Marquette star Red Dunn remained on the bench for the game due to the broken arm sustained in the Boston College game.
