= 1923 Detroit Titans football team =

American college football season

1923 Detroit Titans football
- Conference: Independent
- Record: 4–3–2
- Head coach: Germany Schulz (1st season)
- Home stadium: University of Detroit Stadium

1923 Midwestern college football independents records
	Conf.			Overall
Team	W	L	T	W		L		T
Marquette		–		8	–	0	–	0
Michigan Mines		–		2	–	0	–	0
Notre Dame		–		9	–	1	–	0
Western State Normal		–		6	–	1	–	1
Haskell		–		11	–	2	–	1
Butler		–		7	–	2	–	0
Central Michigan		–		5	–	1	–	2
Baldwin–Wallace		–		5	–	2	–	1
Cincinnati		–		6	–	3	–	0
Loyola (IL)		–		6	–	3	–	0
Saint Louis		–		5	–	3	–	1
Detroit		–		4	–	3	–	2
Wabash		–		4	–	3	–	2
John Carroll		–		4	–	4	–	1
Valparaiso		–		2	–	2	–	1
Dayton		–		4	–	5	–	0
Michigan Agricultural		–		3	–	5	–	0
Fairmount		–		2	–	4	–	2
Kent State		–		0	–	5	–	0

The 1923 Detroit Titans football team represented the University of Detroit as an independent during the 1923 college football season. The team compiled a 4–3–2 record and outscored its opponents by a combined total of 140 to 39.

James F. Duffy retired as the University of Detroit's head football coach after the 1922 season. In January 1923, Germany Schulz was hired as the new head coach. Schulz had played as a center for the University of Michigan and was later inducted into the College Football Hall of Fame.

== Schedule ==
Date	Opponent	Site	Result	Attendance	Source
September 29	Alma	University of Detroit Stadium; Detroit, MI	W 15–0	10,000	
October 6	Kalamazoo	University of Detroit Stadium; Detroit, MI	W 73–0		
October 13	Wilmington (OH)	University of Detroit Stadium; Detroit, MI	W 27–0		
October 27	Washington & Jefferson	University of Detroit Stadium; Detroit, MI	L 0–6		
November 3	Marquette	University of Detroit Stadium; Detroit, MI	L 6–18		
November 10	Carnegie Tech	University of Detroit Stadium; Detroit, MI	T 6–6	10,000	
November 17	Michigan Agricultural	University of Detroit Stadium; Detroit, MI	L 0–2		
November 24	at John Carroll	Dunn Field; Cleveland, OH	T 0–0		
November 29	Gonzaga	University of Detroit Stadium; Detroit, MI	W 13–7	15,000	
