= List of Western Michigan Broncos head football coaches =

The following is the list of Western Michigan Broncos head football coaches. The Western Michigan Broncos football team represents Western Michigan University (WMU) in the National Collegiate Athletic Association (NCAA) Football Bowl Subdivision. WMU has fielded a football team since 1906.

The Broncos have had 17 head coaches in their history. William H. Spaulding and Al Molde have the most wins in WMU history with 62. WMU has three conference championships and has competed in 12 bowl games, winning two and losing ten.

== Key ==
Key to symbols in coaches list
General		Overall		Conference		Postseason (Note: Although the first Rose Bowl Game was played in 1902, it has been continuously played since the 1916 game, and is recognized as the oldest bowl game by the NCAA. "—" indicates any season prior to 1916 when postseason games were not played.)	
No.	Order of coaches (Note: A running total of the number of head coaches, with coaches who served separate tenures being counted only once. Interim head coaches are represented with "Int" and are not counted in the running total. "—" indicates the team played but either without a coach or no coach is on record. "X" indicates an interim year without play.)	GC	Games coached	CW	Conference wins	PW	Postseason wins
DC	Division championships	OW	Overall wins	CL	Conference losses	PL	Postseason losses
CC	Conference championships	OL	Overall losses	CT	Conference ties	PT	Postseason ties
NC	National championships	OT	Overall ties (Note: Overtime rules in college football were introduced in 1996, making ties impossible in the period since.)	C%	Conference winning percentage		
†	Elected to the College Football Hall of Fame	O%	Overall winning percentage (Note: When computing the win–loss percentage, a tie counts as half a win and half a loss.)				

== Head coaches ==
Through the 2025 season

Number	Head coach	Career	Seasons	W	L	T	Win%	CW	CL	CT	CWin%	CC	DC	BG	Ref
1	Tubby Meyers	1906	1	1	2	0	.333	–	–	–	–	–	–	0	
2	William H. Spaulding	1907–1921	15	62	25	3	.706	–	–	–	–	–	–	0	
3	Milton Olander	1922–1923	2	12	1	1	.893	–	–	–	–	–	–	0	
4	Earl Martineau	1924–1928	5	26	10	2	.711	–	–	–	–	–	–	0	
5	Mike Gary	1929–1941	13	59	34	5	.616	–	–	–	–	–	–	0	
6	John Gill	1942–1952	11	50	34	1	.594	8	15	0	.348	0	–	0	
7	Jack Petoskey	1953–1956	4	8	25	2	.257	4	17	1	.205	0	–	0	
8	Merle Schlosser	1957–1963	7	28	33	3	.461	17	23	2	.429	0	–	0	
9	Bill Doolittle	1964–1974	11	58	49	2	.541	24	34	2	.417	1	–	1	
10	Elliot Uzelac	1975–1981	7	38	39	0	.494	30	30	0	.500	0	–	0	
11	Jack Harbaugh	1982–1986	5	25	27	3	.482	19	22	3	.466	0	–	0	
12	Al Molde	1987–1996	10	62	47	2	.568	48	32	1	.599	1	–	1	
13	Gary Darnell	1997–2004	8	46	46	–	.500	35	29	–	.547	0	2	0	
14	Bill Cubit	2005–2012	8	51	46	–	.526	36	27	–	.571	0	0	3	
15	P. J. Fleck	2013–2016	4	30	22	–	.577	21	11	–	.656	1	2	3	
16	Tim Lester	2017–2022	6	37	32	–	.536	26	20	–	.565	0	0	3	
17	Lance Taylor	2023–present	3	20	19	–	.513	15	9	–	.625	1	1	0	2
TOTALS			120	613	492	24	.554	279	265	9	.513	4	5	14	
