= 1923 Wooster Presbyterians football team =

American college football season

1923 Wooster Presbyterians football

OAC co-champion
- Conference: Ohio Athletic Conference
- Record: 9–0 (8–0 OAC)
- Head coach: Lawrence C. Boles (9th season)
- Home stadium: Severance Stadium

1923 Ohio Athletic Conference football standings
	Conf.					Overall
Team	W		L		T	W		L		T
Wooster $	8	–	0	–	0	9	–	0	–	0
Ohio Wesleyan	5	–	0	–	0	6	–	2	–	0
Wittenberg	5	–	1	–	0	7	–	1	–	0
Hiram	5	–	2	–	0	5	–	2	–	0
Cincinnati	5	–	2	–	0	6	–	3	–	0
Otterbein	4	–	3	–	0	5	–	3	–	0
Western Reserve	5	–	4	–	0	5	–	4	–	0
Muskingum	3	–	3	–	0	5	–	3	–	0
Oberlin	3	–	3	–	1	4	–	3	–	1
Mount Union	3	–	3	–	0	5	–	4	–	0
Denison	2	–	2	–	2	3	–	3	–	2
Ohio Northern	3	–	4	–	0	6	–	4	–	0
Akron	2	–	3	–	1	4	–	3	–	1
Ohio	2	–	4	–	1	3	–	5	–	1
St. Xavier	1	–	2	–	0	4	–	4	–	0
Miami (OH)	1	–	4	–	1	3	–	4	–	1
Kenyon	1	–	5	–	0	1	–	6	–	0
Heidelberg	0	–	5	–	0	3	–	5	–	0
Case	0	–	8	–	0	0	–	9	–	0
$ – Conference champion

The 1923 Wooster Presbyterians football team was an American football team that represented the College of Wooster of Wooster, Ohio, as a member of the Ohio Athletic Conference (OAC) during the 1923 college football season. In their ninth year under head coach Lawrence C. Boles, the Presbyterians compiled a perfect 9–0 record (8–0 in conference games), tied with Ohio Wesleyan for the OAC championship, shut out five of nine opponents, and outscored all opponents by a total of 193 to 29. It was Wooster's third perfect season under Boles, the Presbyterians having also accomplished the feat in 1919 and 1920.

Four players from the 1923 Wooster team received first- or second-team honors on the 1923 All-Ohio football team: John Marion Swigart at quarterback (ABJ-1, INS-2); Stanley R. Welty at halfback (ABJ-2, INS-1); Willie Flattery at tackle (ABJ-1, INS-1); and G. Donald Starn at fullback (ABJ-2, INS-3).

Swigart, who weighed only 148 pounds, was a triple-threat man who was known as an excellent open field runner, an excellent punter, and "a sure-handed defensive back." He was later inducted into the College of Wooster Athletic Hall of Fame.

The team played its home games at Severance Stadium in Wooster, Ohio.

== Schedule ==
Date	Opponent	Site	Result	Attendance	Source
September 29	Ashland*	Severance Stadium; Wooster, OH	W 7–0		
October 6	at Otterbein	Westerville, OH	W 21–0		
October 13	Miami (OH)^{†}	Severance Stadium; Wooster, OH	W 13–0	5,000	
October 20	Case	Severance Stadium; Wooster, OH	W 31–6		
October 27	at Cincinnati	Carson Field; Cincinnati, OH	W 20–7	> 7,500	
November 3	at Western Reserve	Van Horn Field; Cleveland, OH	W 16–9		
November 10	at Akron	Buchtel Field; Akron, OH	W 8–0		
November 24	Denison	Severance Stadium; Wooster, OH	W 32–0		
November 29	at Mount Union	Alliance, OH	W 45–7		
*Non-conference game; ^{†}Homecoming

== Game summaries ==
=== Ashland ===
On September 29, Wooster opened its 1923 campaign with a 7–0 non-conference victory over Ashland at Severance Stadium in Wooster, Ohio. Wooster captain Stanley R. Welty scored the game's only touchdown in the second quarter. It was Wooster's lowest point total of the 1923 season.

=== Otterbein ===
On October 6, Wooster defeated Otterbein, 21–0, in its first conference game, played in Westerville, Ohio. Neither team scored in the first half, as Wooster failed to make a first down. Halfback Hurst and fullback Starns each scored touchdowns in the third quarter with Swigart converting both extra point kicks. Swigart was called "the outstanding player on the Wooster team."

=== Miami (OH) ===
On October 13, Wooster defeated Miami (OH), 13–0, before a crowd of 5,000 in Wooster's annual homecoming game. Team captain and halfback Stanley Welty scored the first Wooster touchdown in the first quarter. Later, in the third quarter, fullback Donald Starn fumbled the ball into Miami's end zone, and Siskowic fell on the loose ball and was credited with the touchdown. The Cleveland Plain Dealer opined that tackle Willie Flattery had played "probably the best game of his career."

=== Case ===
On October 20, Wooster defeated the Case Scientists, 31–6, in a home game at Wooster. Hurst, playing at left halfback, led Wooster's rushing attack. Starn scored the first touchdown on the first play of the second quarter. Hurst scored Wooster's second touchdown in the third quarter. Smith also drop-kicked a field goal in the third quarter. Sears ran 26 yards for Wooster's final touchdown in the fourth quarter.

=== Cincinnati ===
On October 27, Wooster defeated the Cincinnati Bearcats, 20–7, before a crowd of over 7,600 spectators at Carson Field in Cincinnati. The Bearcats drove four times inside Wooster's five-yard line, out-gained Wooster by 370 yards to 154 yards, and exceeded Wooster by 17 first downs to eight. Yet, Wooster prevailed.

=== Western Reserve ===
On November 3, Wooster defeated Western Reserve, 16–9, at Van Horn Field in Cleveland. Wooster tallied 24 first downs in the game while holding Western Reserve to zero. Despite the lack of first downs, Western Reserve led, 9–0, at halftime. One minute into the game, Western Reserve recovered a fumble and returned it 34 yards to Wooster's six-yard line and then kicked a field goal. Hap Davis of Western Reserve then ran 75 yards for a touchdown. Welty scored two touchdowns for Woster in the second half. Swigart also drop-kicked a field goal from approximately 33 yards.

=== Akron ===
On November 10, Wooster defeated Akron, 8–0, at Buchtel Field in Akron, Ohio. The field was in poor condition, being described as "a quagmire in spots and very slippery." In the early minutes of the game, Akron halfback Jenkins had difficulty handling an errant snap and was forced to ground the ball behind his goal line for a safety. Halfback Hurst then scored a touchdown, and quarterback Swigart missed the extra point kick. Akron made only one first down in the first three quarters.

=== Denison ===
On November 24, Wooster defeated Denison, 32–0, at home in Wooster. Hurst scored two touchdowns, including a 40-yard run around right end. Swigart returned a punt 55 yards for a touchdown in the fourth quarter.

=== Mount Union ===
On November 29, Wooster ended its season with a 45–7 victory over Mount Union at Alliance, Ohio. Sears scored three touchdowns for Wooster. Swigart made two touchdowns and kicked two extra points. Gabriel and Starn made one touchdown each. The victory clinched a tie for the OAC championship.
