= 1923 Loyola University Chicago football team =

American college football season

1923 Loyola University Chicago football
- Conference: Independent
- Record: 6–3
- Head coach: Roger Kiley (1st season)
- Home stadium: Loyola Field

1923 Midwestern college football independents records
	Conf.			Overall
Team	W	L	T	W		L		T
Marquette		–		8	–	0	–	0
Michigan Mines		–		2	–	0	–	0
Notre Dame		–		9	–	1	–	0
Western State Normal		–		6	–	1	–	1
Haskell		–		11	–	2	–	1
Butler		–		7	–	2	–	0
Central Michigan		–		5	–	1	–	2
Baldwin–Wallace		–		5	–	2	–	1
Cincinnati		–		6	–	3	–	0
Loyola (IL)		–		6	–	3	–	0
Saint Louis		–		5	–	3	–	1
Detroit		–		4	–	3	–	2
Wabash		–		4	–	3	–	2
John Carroll		–		4	–	4	–	1
Valparaiso		–		2	–	2	–	1
Dayton		–		4	–	5	–	0
Michigan Agricultural		–		3	–	5	–	0
Fairmount		–		2	–	4	–	2
Kent State		–		0	–	5	–	0

The 1923 Loyola University Chicago football team was an American football team that represented Loyola University Chicago as an independent during the 1923 college football season. Led by Roger Kiley in his first season as head coach, the Loyola compiled an overall record of 6–3. In January 1923, Kiley was hired from Notre Dame to serve as head coach for Loyola.

== Schedule ==
Date	Opponent	Site	Result	Attendance	Source
October 6	Campion College	Loyola Field; Chicago, IL	W 7–0		
October 13	Central Normal	Loyola Field; Chicago, IL	W 66–2		
October 20	Saint Joseph's (IN)	Loyola Field; Chicago, IL	W 66–0		
October 26	Lewis Institute	Loyola Field; Chicago, IL	W 52–0		
November 3	St. Viator	Loyola Field; Chicago, IL	L 9–26		
November 10	at Saint Louis	Sportsman's Park; St. Louis, MO	L 6–14	5,000	
November 17	Rose Poly	Loyola Field; Chicago, IL	W 31–0		
November 29	St. Ambrose	Loyola Field; Chicago, IL	W 6–0		
