= 1923 Kent State Silver Foxes football team =

American college football season

1923 Kent State Silver Foxes football
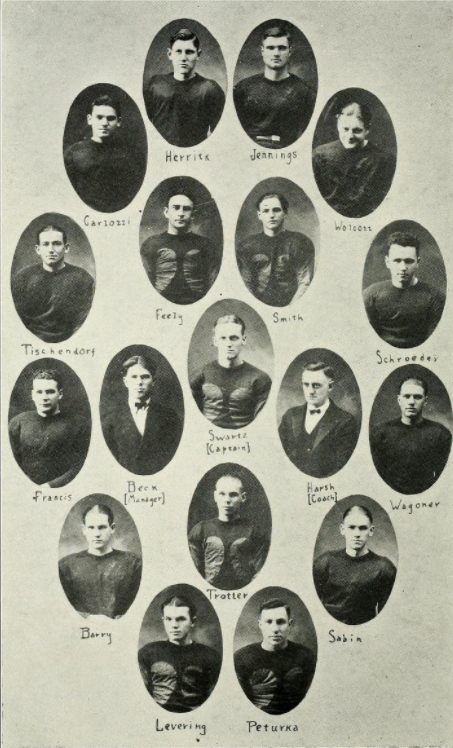
- Conference: Independent
- Record: 0–5
- Head coach: Frank Harsh (1st season)
- Home stadium: Rockwell Field

1923 Midwestern college football independents records
	Conf.			Overall
Team	W	L	T	W		L		T
Marquette		–		8	–	0	–	0
Michigan Mines		–		2	–	0	–	0
Notre Dame		–		9	–	1	–	0
Western State Normal		–		6	–	1	–	1
Haskell		–		11	–	2	–	1
Butler		–		7	–	2	–	0
Central Michigan		–		5	–	1	–	2
Baldwin–Wallace		–		5	–	2	–	1
Cincinnati		–		6	–	3	–	0
Loyola (IL)		–		6	–	3	–	0
Saint Louis		–		5	–	3	–	1
Detroit		–		4	–	3	–	2
Wabash		–		4	–	3	–	2
John Carroll		–		4	–	4	–	1
Valparaiso		–		2	–	2	–	1
Dayton		–		4	–	5	–	0
Michigan Agricultural		–		3	–	5	–	0
Fairmount		–		2	–	4	–	2
Kent State		–		0	–	5	–	0

The 1923 Kent State Silver Foxes football team represented Kent State during the 1923 college football season. In its first season under head coach Frank Harsh, the team compiled a 0–5 record, but did score the first touchdown in program history. Harsh was both coach of the football team and the school's director of athletics.

The Chestnut Burr for 1924 summarized the 1923 football season as follows:

Victory is not essential to success! . . . This is by way of introducing the 1923 football season at Kent State, the record of which shows no victories, but a season which may well be considered the most successful in school history.

There are many reasons why Kent State was not victorious on the gridiron during the past year. The squad was small and without experience. The starting of school one month later than usual prevented the all-important conditioning period. The team that was coached to start the season was early riddled by injuries and withdrawals. Light and inexperienced, the Blue and Gold was forced to meet on the gridiron some of the most formidable elevens in the Ohio Conference.
Please don't misinterpret: this is not written as a defense — the 1923 Kent State football team needs no defense.
Whatever may have been Coach Harsh's contributions in his first year at the helm of Kent State football, there is no gainsaying that the greatest was "FIGHT." Bruised, battered and beaten, Kent State's gallant warriors of the moleskin never relinquished that "FIGHT" and they were battling in the last minute of the last game with a spirit that augurs nothing but victory in the future. The Silver Foxes of 1923 gave to their school its first touchdown, but they also gave something infinitely more than that. They created a fighting spirit that will live — an undying determination that will make the football record at Kent State in the future a thing of joy.

All hail the season of 1923 which witnessed the birth of an unconquerable spirit! Honor the players of 1923 and enshrine them in memory's treasure-house!

== Schedule ==
Date	Opponent	Site	Result	Source
October 6	at Akron	Akron, OH (rivalry)	L 0–32	
October 13	at Baldwin–Wallace	Berea, OH	L 0–118	
	West Liberty	Kent, OH	L 6–7	
November 1	Slippery Rock	Kent, OH	L 0–82	
November 10	at Indiana (PA)	Indiana, PA	L 0–21	
