= 1923 Saint Louis Billikens football team =

American college football season

1923 Saint Louis Billikens football
- Conference: Independent
- Record: 5–3–1
- Head coach: Dan J. Savage (1st season)
- Captain: Quirk (right guard)
- Home stadium: High School Field, Sportsman's Park

1923 Midwestern college football independents records
	Conf.			Overall
Team	W	L	T	W		L		T
Marquette		–		8	–	0	–	0
Michigan Mines		–		2	–	0	–	0
Notre Dame		–		9	–	1	–	0
Western State Normal		–		6	–	1	–	1
Haskell		–		11	–	2	–	1
Butler		–		7	–	2	–	0
Central Michigan		–		5	–	1	–	2
Baldwin–Wallace		–		5	–	2	–	1
Cincinnati		–		6	–	3	–	0
Loyola (IL)		–		6	–	3	–	0
Saint Louis		–		5	–	3	–	1
Detroit		–		4	–	3	–	2
Wabash		–		4	–	3	–	2
John Carroll		–		4	–	4	–	1
Valparaiso		–		2	–	2	–	1
Dayton		–		4	–	5	–	0
Michigan Agricultural		–		3	–	5	–	0
Fairmount		–		2	–	4	–	2
Kent State		–		0	–	5	–	0

The 1923 Saint Louis Billikens football team was an American football team that represented Saint Louis University as an independent during the 1923 college football season. Under the coaching of Dan J. Savage, the Billikens compiled a 5–3–1 record and outscored their opponents, 150 to 97. Notable games included a scoreless tie with the Ole Miss, a 40–0 loss to West Virginia, and a 13–0 loss to Notre Dame.

== Schedule ==
Date	Time	Opponent	Site	Result	Attendance	Source
September 29	3:30 p.m.	Cape Girardeau Normal	High School Field; St. Louis, MO	W 27–0	1,200	
October 6	3:00 p.m.	Jonesboro Aggies	High School Field; St. Louis, MO	W 39–0		
October 13	2:30 p.m.	Illinois College	St. Louis, MO	W 32–7	3,000	
October 20		Missouri	Sportsman's Park; St. Louis, MO	T 0–0	8,000–10,000	
October 27		Ole Miss	Sportsman's Park; St. Louis, MO	W 28–3	5,000	
November 3		at St. Xavier	Cincinnati, OH	L 10–20		
November 10		Loyola (IL)	Sportsman's Park; St. Louis, MO	W 14–6	5,000	
November 17		at West Virginia	Morgantown, WV	L 0–48	5,000	
November 29		Notre Dame	Sportsman's Park; St. Louis, MO	L 0–13	9,333	
All times are in Central time

== Freshman team schedule ==
Date	Opponent	Site	Result	Source
November 10	Scott Field		W 7–6	
