= 1923 Butler Bulldogs football team =

American college football season

1923 Butler Bulldogs football
- Conference: Independent
- Record: 7–2
- Head coach: Harlan Page (4th season)
- Captain: Harold Hungate
- Home stadium: Irwin Field

1923 Midwestern college football independents records
| | Conf. | | | Overall |
| Team | W | L | T | W | | L | | T |
|---|---|---|---|---|---|---|---|---|
| Marquette | | – | | 8 | – | 0 | – | 0 |
| Michigan Mines | | – | | 2 | – | 0 | – | 0 |
| Notre Dame | | – | | 9 | – | 1 | – | 0 |
| Western State Normal | | – | | 6 | – | 1 | – | 1 |
| Haskell | | – | | 11 | – | 2 | – | 1 |
| Butler | | – | | 7 | – | 2 | – | 0 |
| Central Michigan | | – | | 5 | – | 1 | – | 2 |
| Baldwin–Wallace | | – | | 5 | – | 2 | – | 1 |
| Cincinnati | | – | | 6 | – | 3 | – | 0 |
| Loyola (IL) | | – | | 6 | – | 3 | – | 0 |
| Saint Louis | | – | | 5 | – | 3 | – | 1 |
| Detroit | | – | | 4 | – | 3 | – | 2 |
| Wabash | | – | | 4 | – | 3 | – | 2 |
| John Carroll | | – | | 4 | – | 4 | – | 1 |
| Valparaiso | | – | | 2 | – | 2 | – | 1 |
| Dayton | | – | | 4 | – | 5 | – | 0 |
| Michigan Agricultural | | – | | 3 | – | 5 | – | 0 |
| Fairmount | | – | | 2 | – | 4 | – | 2 |
| Kent State | | – | | 0 | – | 5 | – | 0 |

The 1923 Butler Bulldogs football team was an American football team that represented Butler University as an independent during the 1923 college football season. The team played its home games at Irwin Field in Indianapolis. In coach Harlan Page's 4th year, the Bulldogs posted a 7–2 record, went undefeated at home in 7 contests, and outscored their opponents 142 to 81. Their two losses were against national champion Illinois, and Indiana state champion Notre Dame.

== Schedule ==
| Date | Opponent | Site | Result | Attendance | Source |
|---|---|---|---|---|---|
| September 22 | Hanover | Irwin Field; Indianapolis, IN | W 39–0 | 6,000 | |
| September 29 | Chicago YMCA | Irwin Field; Indianapolis, IN | W 26–6 | | |
| October 6 | Franklin (IN) | Irwin Field; Indianapolis, IN | W 13–7 | 10,000 | |
| October 13 | at Illinois | Illinois Field; Champaign, IL | L 7–21 | 12,000 | |
| October 20 | Bethany (WV)^{†} | Irwin Field; Indianapolis, IN | W 16–0 | | |
| October 27 | Wabash | Irwin Field; Indianapolis, IN | W 2–0 | 15,000 | |
| November 10 | DePauw | Irwin Field; Indianapolis | W 13–0 | 1,000+ | |
| November 17 | at Notre Dame | Cartier Field; South Bend, IN ("State Championship") | L 7–34 | 10,000 | |
| November 24 | Haskell | Irwin Field; Indianapolis, IN | W 19–13 | | |
^{†}Homecoming

== Freshman team schedule ==
| Date | Opponent | Site | Result | Source |
|---|---|---|---|---|
| November 3 | DePauw Freshman | Irwin Field; Indianapolis, IN | L 6–31 | |
| November 17 | Franklin Freshman | Irwin Field; Indianapolis, IN | W 19–7 | |
