= 1923 Notre Dame Fighting Irish football team =

American college football season

1923 Notre Dame Fighting Irish football
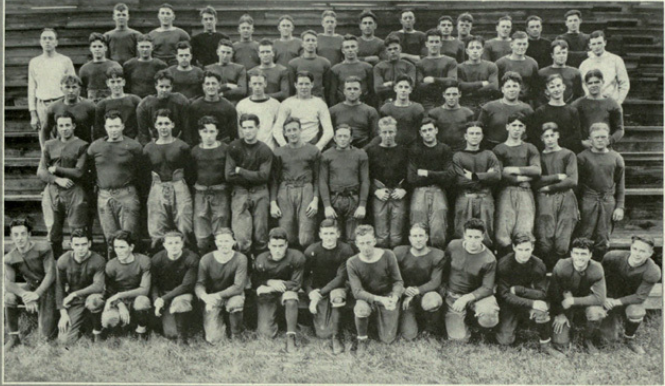

Indiana state champion
- Conference: Independent
- Record: 9–1
- Head coach: Knute Rockne (6th season)
- Offensive scheme: Notre Dame Box
- Base defense: 7–2–2
- Captain: Harvey Brown
- Home stadium: Cartier Field

1923 Midwestern college football independents records
	Conf.			Overall
Team	W	L	T	W		L		T
Marquette		–		8	–	0	–	0
Michigan Mines		–		2	–	0	–	0
Notre Dame		–		9	–	1	–	0
Western State Normal		–		6	–	1	–	1
Haskell		–		11	–	2	–	1
Butler		–		7	–	2	–	0
Central Michigan		–		5	–	1	–	2
Baldwin–Wallace		–		5	–	2	–	1
Cincinnati		–		6	–	3	–	0
Loyola (IL)		–		6	–	3	–	0
Saint Louis		–		5	–	3	–	1
Detroit		–		4	–	3	–	2
Wabash		–		4	–	3	–	2
John Carroll		–		4	–	4	–	1
Valparaiso		–		2	–	2	–	1
Dayton		–		4	–	5	–	0
Michigan Agricultural		–		3	–	5	–	0
Fairmount		–		2	–	4	–	2
Kent State		–		0	–	5	–	0

The 1923 Notre Dame Fighting Irish football team was an American football team that represented the University of Notre Dame as an independent during the 1923 college football season. In their sixth season under head coach Knute Rockne, the Irish compiled a 9–1 record and outscored opponents by a total of 275 to 37. They defeated national powers Army, Princeton, Georgia Tech, and Purdue, but lost to Nebraska.

Key players included quarterback Harry Stuhldreher, halfback Don Miller, fullback Elmer Layden, center Adam Walsh, tackle Joe Bach, and guard Harvey Brown.

The team played its home games on Cartier Field in Notre Dame, Indiana.

== Schedule ==
Date	Opponent	Site	Result	Attendance	Source
September 29	Kalamazoo	Cartier Field; Notre Dame, IN	W 74–0	10,000	
October 7	Lombard	Cartier Field; Notre Dame, IN	W 14–0	8,000	
October 13	vs. Army	Ebbets Field; Brooklyn, NY (rivalry)	W 13–0	30,000	
October 20	at Princeton	Palmer Stadium; Princeton, NJ	W 25–2	30,000	
October 27	Georgia Tech	Cartier Field; Notre Dame, IN (rivalry)	W 35–7	20,000	
November 3	Purdue	Cartier Field; Notre Dame, IN (rivalry)	W 34–7	20,000	
November 10	at Nebraska	Memorial Stadium; Lincoln, NE (rivalry)	L 7–14	30,000	
November 17	Butler	Cartier Field; Notre Dame, IN	W 34–7	10,000	
November 24	at Carnegie Tech	Forbes Field; Pittsburgh, PA	W 26–0	30,000	
November 29	at Saint Louis	Sportsman's Park; St. Louis, MO	W 13–0	9,333	

== Personnel ==
=== Players ===
- Joe Bach, tackle, 180 pounds
- Dutch Bergman, halfback
- Harvey Brown, captain and guard, 165 pounds
- Cerney, fullback
- Collins, end, 172 pounds
- Connell, halfback
- Clem Crowe, end
- Jim Crowley, halfback, 162 pounds
- Hauser, halfback
- Enright
- Noble Kizer, guard, 165 pounds
- Elmer Layden, fullback, 168 pounds
- Livergood
- Willie Maher, halfback
- Gene Mayl, end, 180 pounds
- McGrath
- Don Miller, halfback, 168 pounds
- Murphy, end
- Eugene Oberst, tackle, 180 pounds
- Regan, center
- Gus Stange, tackle
- Harry Stuhldreher, quarterback, 148 pounds
- George Vergara
- Adam Walsh, center, 180 pounds

=== Coaching staff ===
- Head coach: Knute Rockne
