= List of Saint Louis Billikens men's basketball seasons =

This is a list of seasons completed by the Saint Louis Billikens men's college basketball team.

== Seasons ==
Record table
Season	Coach	Overall	Conference	Standing	Postseason
George Keogan (Independent) (1914–1916)
1914–15	George Keogan	9–6			
1915–16	George Keogan	13–6			
Armin Fischer (Independent) (1916–1921)
1916–17	Armin Fischer	5–6			
1917–18	Armin Fischer	3–12			
1918–19	Armin Fischer	4–8			
1919–20	Armin Fischer	2–11			
1920–21	Armin Fischer	12–6			
Steve O’Rourke (Independent) (1921–1922)
1921–22	Steve O’Rourke	4–9			
Dan J. Savage (Independent) (1922–1926)
1922–23	Dan J. Savage	5–5			
1923–24	Dan J. Savage	8–2			
1924–25	Dan J. Savage	14–2			
1925–26	Dan J. Savage	9–4			
Squint Hunter (Independent) (1926–1927)
1926–27	Squint Hunter	0–14			
Harry Regent (Independent) (1927–1928)
1927–28	Harry Regent	11–11			
Mike Nyikos (Independent) (1928–1936)
1928–29	Mike Nyikos	14–4			
1929–30	Mike Nyikos	14–6			
1930–31	Mike Nyikos	13–6			
1931–32	Mike Nyikos	13–6			
1932–33	Mike Nyikos	9–9			
1933–34	Mike Nyikos	10–8			
1934–35	Mike Nyikos	11–5			
1935–36	Mike Nyikos	9–11			
Ed Davidson (Independent) (1936–1937)
1936–37	Ed Davidson	6–15			
Ed Davidson (Missouri Valley Conference) (1937–1938)
1937–38	Ed Davidson	9–20	2–12	8th	
Jack Sterret (Missouri Valley Conference) (1938–1940)
1938–39	Jack Sterret	5–16	3–11	7th	
1939–40	Jack Sterret	4–14	2–10	7th	
Bob Klenck (Missouri Valley Conference) (1940–1943)
1940–41	Bob Klenck	3–14	2–10	7th	
1941–42	Bob Klenck	8–12	4–6	4th	
1942–43	Bob Klenck	11–10	3–7	4th	
1943–44	No team	^{[Note A]}	^{[Note A]}	^{[Note A]}	
Dukes Duford (Missouri Valley Conference) (1944–1945)
1944–45	Dukes Duford	10–4	^{[Note A]}	^{[Note A]}	
John Flanigan (Missouri Valley Conference) (1945–1947)
1945–46	John Flanigan	13–11	6–5	3rd	
1946–47	John Flanigan	18–11	11–1	1st	NCAA Regional Playoff^{[Note B]}
Eddie Hickey (Missouri Valley Conference) (1947–1958)
1947–48	Eddie Hickey	24–3	8–2	2nd	NIT Champion
1948–49	Eddie Hickey	22–4	8–2	2nd	NIT Quarterfinal
1949–50	Eddie Hickey	17–9	8–4	2nd	
1950–51	Eddie Hickey	22–8	11–3	T–2nd	NIT Quarterfinal
1951–52	Eddie Hickey	23–8	9–1	1st	NIT first round NCAA Elite Eight
1952–53	Eddie Hickey	16–11	5–5	T–3rd	
1953–54	Eddie Hickey	15–12	4–6	4th	
1954–55	Eddie Hickey	20–8	8–2	T–1st	NIT Quarterfinal
1955–56	Eddie Hickey	18–7	8–4	2nd	NIT first round
1956–57	Eddie Hickey	19–9	12–2	1st	NCAA University Division Sweet Sixteen
1957–58	Eddie Hickey	16–10	9–5	3rd	
John Benington (Missouri Valley Conference) (1958–1965)
1958–59	John Benington	20–6	10–4	3rd	NIT Quarterfinal
1959–60	John Benington	19–8	9–5	3rd	NIT Quarterfinal
1960–61	John Benington	21–9	7–5	4th	NIT Runner-up
1961–62	John Benington	11–15	5–7	5th	
1962–63	John Benington	16–12	6–6	4th	
1963–64	John Benington	13–12	6–6	5th	
1964–65	John Benington	18–9	9–5	T–2nd	NIT first round
Joe "Buddy" Brehmer (Missouri Valley Conference) (1965–1969)
1965–66	Joe "Buddy" Brehmer	15–10	8–6	4th	
1966–67	Joe "Buddy" Brehmer	13–13	5–9	6th	
1967–68	Joe "Buddy" Brehmer	15–11	9–7	5th	
1968–69	Joe "Buddy" Brehmer	6–20	5–11	8th	
Robert Polk (Missouri Valley Conference) (1969–1974)
1969–70	Robert Polk	9–17	5–11	7th	
1970–71	Robert Polk	17–12	9–5	T–1st	
1971–72	Robert Polk	18–8	9–5	3rd	
1972–73	Robert Polk	19–7	10–4	3rd	
1973–74	Robert Polk	9–16	4–8	7th	
Randy Albrecht (Independent) (1974–1975)
1974–75	Randy Albrecht	12–14			
Randy Albrecht (Metro Conference) (1975–1977)
1975–76	Randy Albrecht	13–14	0–2	6th	
1976–77	Randy Albrecht	7–19	1–5	6th	
Ron Coleman (Metro Conference) (1977–1978)
1977–78	Ron Coleman	7–20	2–10	6th	
Ron Ekker (Metro Conference) (1978–1982)
1978–79	Ron Ekker	10–17	3–7	6th	
1979–80	Ron Ekker	12–15	4–8	5th	
1980–81	Ron Ekker	9–18	3–9	7th	
1981–82	Ron Ekker	6–21	1–11	7th	
Rich Grawer (Midwestern City/Collegiate Conference) (1982–1991)
1982–83	Rich Grawer	5–23	2–12	7th	
1983–84	Rich Grawer	12–16	5–9	6th	
1984–85	Rich Grawer	13–15	6–8	6th	
1985–86	Rich Grawer	18–12	8–4	2nd	
1986–87	Rich Grawer	25–10	7–5	T–3rd	NIT second round
1987–88	Rich Grawer	14–14	5–5	T–3rd	
1988–89	Rich Grawer	27–10	8–4	2nd	NIT Runner-up
1989–90	Rich Grawer	21–12	9–5	T–3rd	NIT Runner-up
1990–91	Rich Grawer	19–14	8–6	T–3rd	
Rich Grawer (Great Midwest Conference) (1991–1992)
1991–92	Rich Grawer	5–23	0–10	6th	
Charlie Spoonhour (Great Midwest Conference) (1992–1995)
1992–93	Charlie Spoonhour	12–17	1–9	6th	
1993–94	Charlie Spoonhour	23–6	8–4	2nd	NCAA Division I first round
1994–95	Charlie Spoonhour	23–8	8–4	2nd	NCAA Division I second round
Charlie Spoonhour (Conference USA) (1995–1999)
1995–96	Charlie Spoonhour	16–14	4–10	3rd (Blue)	NIT first round
1996–97	Charlie Spoonhour	11–18	4–10	3rd (Blue)	
1997–98	Charlie Spoonhour	22–11	11–5	3rd (American)	NCAA Division I second round
1998–99	Charlie Spoonhour	15–16	8–8	5th (American)	
Lorenzo Romar (Conference USA) (1999–2002)
1999–00	Lorenzo Romar	19–14	7–9	T–5th (American)	NCAA Division I first round
2000–01	Lorenzo Romar	17–14	8–8	T–4th (American)	
2001–02	Lorenzo Romar	15–16	9–7	4th (American)	
Brad Soderberg (Conference USA) (2002–2005)
2002–03	Brad Soderberg	16–14	9–7	T–3rd (American)	NIT first round
2003–04	Brad Soderberg	19–13	9–7	T–6th	NIT second round
2004–05	Brad Soderberg	9–21	6–10	10th	
Brad Soderberg (Atlantic 10 Conference) (2005–2007)
2005–06	Brad Soderberg	16–13	10–6	T–3rd	
2006–07	Brad Soderberg	20–13	8–8	T–6th	
Rick Majerus (Atlantic 10 Conference) (2007–2012)
2007–08	Rick Majerus	16–15	7–9	T–9th	
2008–09	Rick Majerus	18–14	8–8	8th	
2009–10	Rick Majerus	23–13	11–5	4th	CBI Runner-up
2010–11	Rick Majerus	12–19	6–10	T–10th	
2011–12	Rick Majerus	26–8	12–4	2nd	NCAA Division I second round
Jim Crews (Atlantic 10 Conference) (2012–2016)
2012–13	Jim Crews	28–7	13–3	1st	NCAA Division I second round
2013–14	Jim Crews	27–7	13–3	1st	NCAA Division I second round
2014–15	Jim Crews	11–21	3–15	14th	
2015–16	Jim Crews	11–21	5–13	T–12th	
Travis Ford (Atlantic 10 Conference) (2016–2024)
2016–17	Travis Ford	12–21	6–12	11th	
2017–18	Travis Ford	17–16	9–9	5th	
2018–19	Travis Ford	23–13	10–8	6th	NCAA Division I first round
2019–20	Travis Ford	23–8	12–6	4th	No postseason held
2020–21	Travis Ford	14–7	6–4	4th	NIT first round
2021–22	Travis Ford	23–12	12–6	5th	NIT first round
2022–23	Travis Ford	21–12	12–6	T–2nd	
2023–24	Travis Ford	13–20	5–13	T–13th	
Josh Schertz (Atlantic 10 Conference) (2024–present)
2024–25	Josh Schertz	19–15	11–7	T–5th	NIT first round
2025–26	Josh Schertz	29–6	15–3	T–1st	NCAA Division I second round
Total:		1,550–1,301			
National champion Postseason invitational champion Conference regular season champion Conference regular season and conference tournament champion Division regular season champion Division regular season and conference tournament champion Conference tournament champion

^A.The MVC also cancelled the season due to World War II.
^B. The regional playoff was not counted as an official NCAA tourney game.
