= 1923 Dayton Flyers football team =

American college football season

1923 Dayton Flyers football
- Conference: Independent
- Record: 4–5
- Head coach: Harry Baujan (1st season)
- Home stadium: Varsity Field

1923 Midwestern college football independents records
	Conf.			Overall
Team	W	L	T	W		L		T
Marquette		–		8	–	0	–	0
Michigan Mines		–		2	–	0	–	0
Notre Dame		–		9	–	1	–	0
Western State Normal		–		6	–	1	–	1
Haskell		–		11	–	2	–	1
Butler		–		7	–	2	–	0
Central Michigan		–		5	–	1	–	2
Baldwin–Wallace		–		5	–	2	–	1
Cincinnati		–		6	–	3	–	0
Loyola (IL)		–		6	–	3	–	0
Saint Louis		–		5	–	3	–	1
Detroit		–		4	–	3	–	2
Wabash		–		4	–	3	–	2
John Carroll		–		4	–	4	–	1
Valparaiso		–		2	–	2	–	1
Dayton		–		4	–	5	–	0
Michigan Agricultural		–		3	–	5	–	0
Fairmount		–		2	–	4	–	2
Kent State		–		0	–	5	–	0

The 1923 Dayton Flyers football team was an American football team that represented the University of Dayton as an independent during the 1923 college football season. The team compiled a 4–5 record.

Harry Baujan was hired as Dayton's head football coach prior to the 1923 season. He had played football under Knute Rockne at Notre Dame. In his first game as head coach, Baujan led Dayton to a 161-0 victory over the Indiana Central Normal School.

Baujan served as Dayton's head coach through the 1946 season and was posthumously inducted into the College Football Hall of Fame in 1990.

== Schedule ==
Date	Opponent	Site	Result	Source
September 29	Indiana Central Normal	Varsity Field; Dayton, OH	W 161–0	
October 6	Duquesne	South Park Field; Dayton, OH	W 27–0	
October 13	Transylvania	Varsity Field; Dayton, OH	W 35–0	
October 20	Marietta	Varsity Field; Dayton, OH	L 0–6	
October 27	at Canisius	Canisius Field; Buffalo, NY	L 0–12	
November 3	John Carroll	Dunn Field; Cleveland, OH	L 0–27	
November 17	at Lafayette	Easton, PA	L 0–45	
November 24	Wilmington	Varsity Field; Dayton, OH	W 34–0	
November 29	at Ashland	Ashland, OH	L 2–12	
