= 1923 Haskell Indians football team =

American college football season

1923 Haskell Indians football
- Conference: Independent
- Record: 11–2–1
- Head coach: Dick Hanley (2nd season)
- Captain: John Levi
- Home stadium: Haskell Field

1923 Midwestern college football independents records
	Conf.			Overall
Team	W	L	T	W		L		T
Marquette		–		8	–	0	–	0
Michigan Mines		–		2	–	0	–	0
Notre Dame		–		9	–	1	–	0
Western State Normal		–		6	–	1	–	1
Haskell		–		11	–	2	–	1
Butler		–		7	–	2	–	0
Central Michigan		–		5	–	1	–	2
Baldwin–Wallace		–		5	–	2	–	1
Cincinnati		–		6	–	3	–	0
Loyola (IL)		–		6	–	3	–	0
Saint Louis		–		5	–	3	–	1
Detroit		–		4	–	3	–	2
Wabash		–		4	–	3	–	2
John Carroll		–		4	–	4	–	1
Valparaiso		–		2	–	2	–	1
Dayton		–		4	–	5	–	0
Michigan Agricultural		–		3	–	5	–	0
Fairmount		–		2	–	4	–	2
Kent State		–		0	–	5	–	0

The 1923 Haskell Indians football team was an American football team that represented the Haskell Institute (later renamed Haskell Indian Nations University) as an independent during the 1923 college football season. In its second season under head coach Dick Hanley, the team compiled an 11–2–1 record, shut out eight opponents, and outscored all opponents by a total of 496 to 62.

For the second consecutive season, fullback John Levi, also known as "Skee", was the team captain. He was also selected by Football World and Athletic World magazines as the first-team fullback on the 1923 All-America team. Haskell players finished first and second in the US in scoring: John Levi with 149 points and end Ansel Carpenter, aka "White Weasel", with 104 points. Carpenter caught a record-breaking 55-yard pass from Levi in 1923 and developed a reputation as "one of the surest kickers in the game."

Other notable players on Haskell's 1923 team included George Levi and Elkins at halfback, Scott at quarterback, King at center, Jack Norton, aka "Charging Skunk", and Kilbuck at guard, and Peratrovich, Nix, and Theodore "Tiny" Roebuck at tackle. John Levi were inaugural inductees in 1971 into the American Indian Athletic Hall of Fame.

== Schedule ==
Date	Time	Opponent	Site	Result	Attendance	Source
September 22		Kansas City University	Haskell Field; Lawrence, KS	W 98–0		
September 28		at Pittsburg State	Pittsburg, KS	W 34–0		
October 5		Warrensburg State	Haskell Field; Lawrence, KS	W 89–0		
October 13		at Minnesota	Northrop Field; Minneapolis, MN	L 12–13	15,000	
October 20		Friends	Haskell Field; Lawrence, KS	W 63–0		
October 27		at Fairmount	Wichita, KS	W 20–3		
November 3	2:30 p.m.	at Creighton	Creighton Field; Omaha, NE	W 26–0	8,000	
November 9		Still	Haskell Field; Lawrence, KS	W 34–7		
November 17		vs. Quantico Marines	Yankee Stadium; New York, NY	T 14–14	10,000	
November 24		at Butler	Irwin Field; Indianapolis, IN	L 13–19		
November 29		at St. Xavier	Corcoran Field; Cincinnati, OH	W 38–0		
December 8		at Tulsa	Tulsa, OK	W 35–0	5,000	
December 12		vs. Oklahoma Baptist	Muskogee, OK	W 13–0		
December 25		at Olympic Club	Washington Park; Los Angeles, CA	W 7–6		
All times are in Central time
