= 1923 North Dakota Agricultural Bison football team =

American college football season

1923 North Dakota Agricultural Bison football
- Conference: North Central Conference
- Record: 2–4–1 (1–3 NCC)
- Head coach: Stanley Borleske (4th season)
- Captain: Ben Rumpeltes
- Home stadium: Dacotah Field

1923 North Central Conference football standings
	Conf.					Overall
Team	W		L		T	W		L		T
Morningside $	3	–	1	–	0	5	–	2	–	0
North Dakota	2	–	1	–	0	5	–	3	–	0
Des Moines	2	–	1	–	1	5	–	4	–	1
South Dakota State	2	–	3	–	0	3	–	4	–	0
Creighton	1	–	2	–	0	5	–	5	–	0
North Dakota Agricultural	1	–	2	–	0	2	–	4	–	1
South Dakota	1	–	3	–	1	4	–	3	–	1
Nebraska Wesleyan *	1	–	0	–	1	6	–	1	–	2
$ – Conference champion; * – ineligible for conference title; too few games played

The 1923 North Dakota Agricultural Bison football team was an American football team that represented North Dakota Agricultural College (now known as North Dakota State University) in the North Central Conference (NCC) during the 1923 college football season. In its fourth, nonconsecutive season under head coach Stanley Borleske, the team compiled a 2–4–1 record (1–3 against NCC opponents) and tied for fifth place out of eight teams in the NCC. The team played its home games at Dacotah Field in Fargo, North Dakota.

== Schedule ==
Date	Opponent	Site	Result	Source
September 29	Jamestown*	Dacotah Field; Fargo, ND	W 21–0	
October 6	Superior Normal*	Dacotah Field; Fargo, ND	L 0–2	
October 13	South Dakota State	Dacotah Field; Fargo, ND (rivalry)	W 14–13	
October 20	at Des Moines*	Des Moines, IA	T 0–0	
October 27	at North Dakota	Grand Forks, ND (rivalry)	L 3–10	
November 3	Morningside	Dacotah Field; Fargo, ND	L 0–12	
November 10	at St. Thomas (MN)	Cadet Field; St. Paul, MN	L 0–26	
*Non-conference game
