= 1923 Creighton Blue and White football team =

American college football season

1923 Creighton Blue and White football
- Conference: North Central Conference
- Record: 5–5 (1–2 NCC)
- Head coach: Chet A. Wynne (1st season)
- Home stadium: Creighton Field

1923 North Central Conference football standings
	Conf.					Overall
Team	W		L		T	W		L		T
Morningside $	3	–	1	–	0	5	–	2	–	0
North Dakota	2	–	1	–	0	5	–	3	–	0
Des Moines	2	–	1	–	1	5	–	4	–	1
South Dakota State	2	–	3	–	0	3	–	4	–	0
Creighton	1	–	2	–	0	5	–	5	–	0
North Dakota Agricultural	1	–	2	–	0	2	–	4	–	1
South Dakota	1	–	3	–	1	4	–	3	–	1
Nebraska Wesleyan *	1	–	0	–	1	6	–	1	–	2
$ – Conference champion; * – ineligible for conference title; too few games played

The 1923 Creighton Blue and White football team was an American football team that represented Creighton University in the North Central Conference (NCC) during the 1923 college football season. In its first season under head coach Chet A. Wynne, the team compiled a 5–5 record (1–2 against conference opponents). The team played its home games in Omaha, Nebraska.

== Schedule ==
Date	Time	Opponent	Site	Result	Attendance	Source
September 30		at Midland*	Fremont, NE	W 13–0		
October 6		at Kansas*	Memorial Stadium; Lawrence, KS	L 0–6		
October 13		at Kansas State*	Memorial Stadium; Manhattan, KS	L 0–6		
October 20		at South Dakota State	Brookings, SD	L 20–27		
October 27	2:30 p.m.	Des Moines	Omaha, NE	L 6–7	4,500	
November 3	2:30 p.m.	Haskell*^{†}	Creighton Field; Omaha, NE	L 0–26	8,000	
November 10		at Michigan Agricultural*	East Lansing, MI	W 27–6		
November 17	2:30 p.m.	South Dakota	Omaha, NE	W 34–0	4,000	
November 24		at Oklahoma A&M*	Lewis Field; Stillwater, OK	W 13–2		
December 1		at Grinnell*	Grinnell, IA	W 14–0		
*Non-conference game; ^{†}Homecoming; All times are in Central time
