= 1923 Kalamazoo Baptists football team =

American college football season

1923 Kalamazoo Baptists football
- Conference: Michigan Intercollegiate Athletic Association
- Record: 0–10 (0–5 MIAA)
- Head coach: Maynard Street (1st season)

1923 Michigan Intercollegiate Athletic Association football standings
	Conf.					Overall
Team	W		L		T	W		L		T
Alma $	5	–	0	–	0	6	–	2	–	1
Albion	4	–	1	–	0	7	–	2	–	0
Olivet	3	–	2	–	0	5	–	3	–	1
Hillsdale	1	–	3	–	1	3	–	4	–	1
Michigan State Normal	1	–	3	–	1	2	–	5	–	1
Kalamazoo	0	–	5	–	0	0	–	10	–	0
$ – Conference champion

The 1923 Kalamazoo Baptists football team was an American football team that represented Kalamazoo College during the 1923 college football season. In Maynard Street's first year as head coach, the Baptists compiled a record overall record of 0–10 with a mark of 0–5 in conference play, placing last out of six teams in the MIAA. The season record of 0–10 remains the worst in program history.

== Schedule ==
Date	Time	Opponent	Site	Result	Attendance	Source
September 30		at Notre Dame*	Cartier Field; Notre Dame, IN	L 0–74	10,000	
October 6		at Detroit*	Dinan Field; Detroit, MI	L 0–73		
October 13		at Olivet	Olivet, MI	L 7–29		
October 20	2:30 p.m.	Morningside*	Kalamazoo College campus; Kalamazoo, MI	L 0–68		
October 27		at Marietta*	Marietta, OH	L 0–56		
November 3		Michigan State Normal	Kalamazoo, MI	L 3–19		
November 10		at Hillsdale	Hillsdale, MI	L 13–27		
November 17		at Alma	Alma, MI	L 0–38		
November 24		Albion	Kalamazoo, MI	L 7–21		
November 29		at Lombard*	Galesburg, IL	L 0–70		
*Non-conference game; All times are in Central time
