= 1923 Michigan State Normal Normalites football team =

American college football season

1923 Michigan State Normal Normalites football
- Conference: Michigan Intercollegiate Athletic Association
- Record: 2–5–1 (1–3–1 MIAA)
- Head coach: James M. Brown (1st season)
- Captain: Malcolm I. Dickie

1923 Michigan Intercollegiate Athletic Association football standings
| | Conf. | | | | | Overall |
| Team | W | | L | | T | W | | L | | T |
|---|---|---|---|---|---|---|---|---|---|---|
| Alma $ | 5 | – | 0 | – | 0 | 6 | – | 2 | – | 1 |
| Albion | 4 | – | 1 | – | 0 | 7 | – | 2 | – | 0 |
| Olivet | 3 | – | 2 | – | 0 | 5 | – | 3 | – | 1 |
| Hillsdale | 1 | – | 3 | – | 1 | 3 | – | 4 | – | 1 |
| Michigan State Normal | 1 | – | 3 | – | 1 | 2 | – | 5 | – | 1 |
| Kalamazoo | 0 | – | 5 | – | 0 | 0 | – | 10 | – | 0 |
$ – Conference champion

The 1923 Michigan State Normal Normalites football team represented Michigan State Normal College (later renamed Eastern Michigan University) during the 1923 college football season. In their first season under head coach James M. Brown, the Normalites compiled a record of 2–5–1 and were outscored by their opponents by a combined total of 104 to 55. Malcolm I. Dickie was the team captain.

== Schedule ==
| Date | Opponent | Site | Result |
|---|---|---|---|
| September 29 | Adrian* | Ypsilanti, MI | W 13–0 |
| October 6 | at Toledo* | Toledo, OH | L 0–13 |
| October 13 | Hillsdale | Ypsilanti, MI | T 6–6 |
| October 20 | Alma | Ypsilanti, MI | L 0–19 |
| October 27 | at Central Michigan* | Mount Pleasant, MI (rivalry) | L 3–27 |
| November 3 | at Kalamazoo | Kalamazoo, MI | W 19–3 |
| November 17 | Albion | Ypsilanti, MI | L 7–21 |
| November 22 | at Olivet | Olivet, MI | L 7–15 |
*Non-conference game
