= Lawrence C. Boles =

American football player and coach (1883–1945)

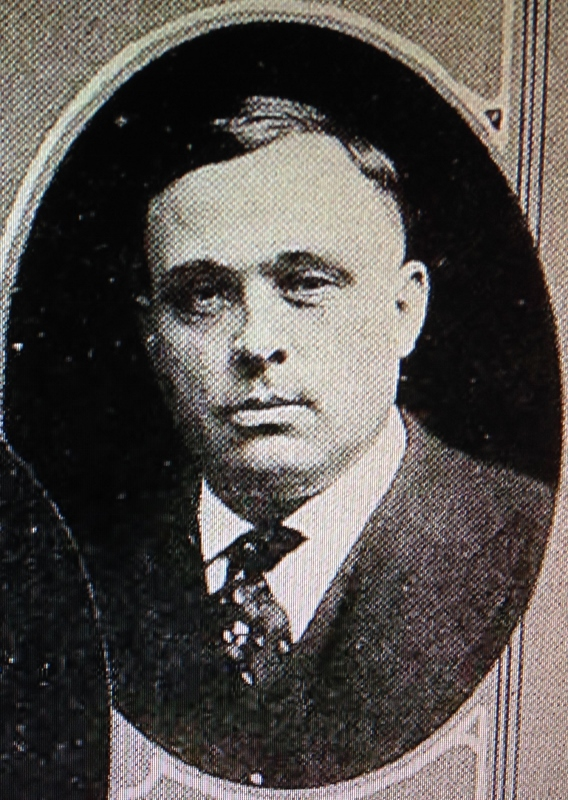

Biographical details
- Born: September 9, 1883; Blanchester, Ohio, U.S.
- Died: August 19, 1945 (aged 61)

Playing career
- 1902–1903: Ohio Wesleyan

Coaching career (HC unless noted)

Football
- 1906: London HS (OH)
- 1907–1912: Fostoria HS (OH)
- 1913–1914: East HS (OH)
- 1915–1925: Wooster
- 1927–1939: Wooster

Basketball
- 1915–1926: Wooster

Administrative career (AD unless noted)
- 1915–?: Wooster

Head coaching record
- Overall: 134–50–19 (college football); 86–74 (college basketball); 66–7–4 (high school football)

Accomplishments and honors

Championships
- 5 OAC (1919–1920, 1923, 1934, 1938)

Lawrence Casper Boles (September 9, 1883 – August 19, 1945) was an American college football player and coach. He served as the head coach at the College of Wooster from 1915 to 1925 and again from 1927 to 1939, compiling a record of 134–50–19. Boles was also the head basketball coach at Wooster from 1915 to 1926, tallying a mark of 86–74.

== Early life and family ==
Boles was born on September 9, 1883, in Blanchester, Ohio. He was the son of Wilson Homer Boles (July 17, 1848 – May 2, 1912) and Anna "Annie "Girton Boles (August 22, 1853 – January 31, 1941). Boles married Lillian C. Cochran (June 20, 1884 – Jul 5, 1974). The couple had a daughter named Carmen (1909–1969).

== Coaching career ==
Boles began his coaching career at London High School in London, Ohio, where he led the football team to a record of 6–1 in the fall of 1906. From 1907 to 1912, he was the football coach at Fostoria High School in Fostoria, Ohio, guiding his teams to a mark of 47–4–2 in six seasons. In 1913 and 1914, Boles coached football at East High School his Cleveland, compiling a record of 13–2–2 in two seasons.

== Death ==
Boles died on August 19, 1945.

== Head coaching record ==
=== College football ===
Year	Team	Overall	Conference	Standing	Bowl/playoffs
Wooster Presbyterians (Ohio Athletic Conference) (1915–1925)
1915	Wooster	3–3–2	3–1–2	T–4th	
1916	Wooster	6–2	5–2	5th	
1917	Wooster	6–0–3	5–0–3	2nd	
1918	Wooster	6–1	5–1	T–3rd	
1919	Wooster	8–0	7–0	1st	
1920	Wooster	9–0	7–0	1st	
1921	Wooster	6–2	6–2	5th	
1922	Wooster	8–1	7–1	4th	
1923	Wooster	9–0	7–0	1st	
1924	Wooster	6–2–2	5–2–1	5th	
1925	Wooster	6–2	5–1	3rd	
Wooster Presbyterians / Fighting Scots (Ohio Athletic Conference) (1927–1938)
1927	Wooster	6–2	5–2	6th	
1928	Wooster	2–4–2	2–2–2	5th	
1929	Wooster	5–2–1	5–2–1	6th	
1930	Wooster	5–3–1	4–1–1	3rd	
1931	Wooster	4–5	2–4	13th	
1932	Wooster	5–1–2	4–1–2	6th	
1933	Wooster	7–1–1	7–1–1	2nd	
1934	Wooster	8–1	8–0	1st	
1935	Wooster	3–4–2	3–3–2	T–9th	
1936	Wooster	3–6	3–5	15th	
1937	Wooster	6–2	5–2	6th	
1938	Wooster	5–0–3	5–0–2	1st	
1939	Wooster	2–6	2–4	T–13th	
Wooster:		134–50–19	117–37–17		
Total:		134–50–19			
National championship Conference title Conference division title or championship game berth
