= 1923 South Dakota State Jackrabbits football team =

American college football season

1923 South Dakota State Jackrabbits football
- Conference: North Central Conference
- Record: 2–5 (1–4 NCC)
- Head coach: Charles A. West (5th season)

1923 North Central Conference football standings
	Conf.					Overall
Team	W		L		T	W		L		T
Morningside $	3	–	1	–	0	5	–	2	–	0
North Dakota	2	–	1	–	0	5	–	3	–	0
Des Moines	2	–	1	–	1	5	–	4	–	1
South Dakota State	2	–	3	–	0	3	–	4	–	0
Creighton	1	–	2	–	0	5	–	5	–	0
North Dakota Agricultural	1	–	2	–	0	2	–	4	–	1
South Dakota	1	–	3	–	1	4	–	3	–	1
Nebraska Wesleyan *	1	–	0	–	1	6	–	1	–	2
$ – Conference champion; * – ineligible for conference title; too few games played

The 1923 South Dakota State Jackrabbits football team was an American football team that represented South Dakota State College in the North Central Conference (NCC) during the 1923 college football season. In its fifth season under head coach Charles A. West, the team compiled a 2–5 record, finished fourth in the NCC, and outscored opponents by a total of 94 to 78.

== Schedule ==
Date	Opponent	Site	Result
October 6	Dakota Wesleyan*	Brookings, SD	W 44–0
October 13	at North Dakota Agricultural	Dacotah Field; Fargo, ND (rivalry)	L 13–14
October 20	Creighton	Brookings, SD	L 0–13
October 27	at South Dakota	Vermillion, SD (rivalry)	W 7–0
November 3	North Dakota	Brookings, SD	L 6–12
November 10	at Morningside	Sioux City, IA	L 24–26
November 17	Marquette*	Milwaukee, WI	L 0–13
*Non-conference game
