= 1923 South Dakota Coyotes football team =

American college football season

1923 South Dakota Coyotes football
- Conference: North Central Conference
- Record: 4–3–1 (1–3–1 NCC)
- Head coach: Stub Allison (2nd season)

1923 North Central Conference football standings
	Conf.					Overall
Team	W		L		T	W		L		T
Morningside $	3	–	1	–	0	5	–	2	–	0
North Dakota	2	–	1	–	0	5	–	3	–	0
Des Moines	2	–	1	–	1	5	–	4	–	1
South Dakota State	2	–	3	–	0	3	–	4	–	0
Creighton	1	–	2	–	0	5	–	5	–	0
North Dakota Agricultural	1	–	2	–	0	2	–	4	–	1
South Dakota	1	–	3	–	1	4	–	3	–	1
Nebraska Wesleyan *	1	–	0	–	1	6	–	1	–	2
$ – Conference champion; * – ineligible for conference title; too few games played

The 1923 South Dakota Coyotes football team was an American football team that represented the University of South Dakota in the North Central Conference (NCC) during the 1923 college football season. In its second season under head coach Stub Allison, the team compiled a 4–3–1 record (1–3–1 against NCC opponents), finished in seventh place out of eight teams in the NCC, and outscored opponents by a total of 119 to 60.

== Schedule ==
Date	Time	Opponent	Site	Result	Attendance	Source
September 29		Northern State*	Vermillion, SD	W 27–0		
October 6		Yankton*	Vermillion, SD	W 48–0		
October 13		at North Dakota	Grand Forks, ND (rivalry)	W 13–7		
October 20		Nebraska Wesleyan	Vermillion, SD	T 0–0		
October 27		South Dakota State	Vermillion, SD (rivalry)	L 0–7		
November 10		at Dakota Wesleyan*	Mitchell, SD	W 31–2		
November 17	2:30 p.m.	at Creighton	Omaha, NE	L 0–34	4,000	
November 29		at Morningside	Sioux City, IA	L 0–10		
*Non-conference game; All times are in Central time
