= 1923 St. Xavier Saints football team =

American college football season

1923 St. Xavier Saints football
- Conference: Ohio Athletic Conference
- Record: 4–4 (1–2 OAC)
- Head coach: Joseph A. Meyer (4th season)
- Home stadium: Corcoran Field

1923 Ohio Athletic Conference football standings
	Conf.					Overall
Team	W		L		T	W		L		T
Wooster $	8	–	0	–	0	9	–	0	–	0
Ohio Wesleyan	5	–	0	–	0	6	–	2	–	0
Wittenberg	5	–	1	–	0	7	–	1	–	0
Hiram	5	–	2	–	0	5	–	2	–	0
Cincinnati	5	–	2	–	0	6	–	3	–	0
Otterbein	4	–	3	–	0	5	–	3	–	0
Western Reserve	5	–	4	–	0	5	–	4	–	0
Muskingum	3	–	3	–	0	5	–	3	–	0
Oberlin	3	–	3	–	1	4	–	3	–	1
Mount Union	3	–	3	–	0	5	–	4	–	0
Denison	2	–	2	–	2	3	–	3	–	2
Ohio Northern	3	–	4	–	0	6	–	4	–	0
Akron	2	–	3	–	1	4	–	3	–	1
Ohio	2	–	4	–	1	3	–	5	–	1
St. Xavier	1	–	2	–	0	4	–	4	–	0
Miami (OH)	1	–	4	–	1	3	–	4	–	1
Kenyon	1	–	5	–	0	1	–	6	–	0
Heidelberg	0	–	5	–	0	3	–	5	–	0
Case	0	–	8	–	0	0	–	9	–	0
$ – Conference champion

The 1923 St. Xavier Saints football team was an American football team that represented St. Xavier College (now known as Xavier University) as a member of the Ohio Athletic Conference (OAC) during the 1923 college football season. In their fourth year under head coach Joseph A. Meyer, the Saints compiled a 4–4 record.

== Schedule ==
Date	Opponent	Site	Result	Source
October 6	Western Kentucky State Normal*	Corcoran Field; Cincinnati, OH	W 21–14	
October 13	Ohio	Corcoran Field; Cincinnati, OH	W 15–7	
October 20	John Carroll*	Corcoran Field; Cincinnati, OH	W 13–9	
November 3	Saint Louis*	Corcoran Field; Cincinnati, OH	W 20–10	
November 10	at Navy*	Worden Field; Annapolis, MD	L 0–61	
November 17	at Ohio Wesleyan	Edwards Field; Delaware, OH	L 12–40	
November 24	Otterbein	Corcoran Field; Cincinnati, OH	L 6–7	
November 29	Haskell*	Corcoran Field; Cincinnati, OH	L 0–38	
*Non-conference game
