= Maynard Street =

American football and basketball coach (1898–1993)

- Street pictured in The Boiling Pot 1924, Kalamazoo yearbook

Biographical details
- Born: December 12, 1898; Lamberton, Minnesota, U.S.
- Died: January 5, 1993 (aged 94); Rice, Minnesota, U.S.
- Education: Carleton College

Coaching career (HC unless noted)

Football
- 1923–1924: Kalamazoo

Basketball
- 1923–1925: Kalamazoo

Head coaching record
- Overall: 2–16 (football); 15–14 (basketball)

John Maynard Street (December 12, 1898 – January 5, 1993) was an American college football and college basketball coach. He served as the head football coach at Kalamazoo College in Kalamazoo, Michigan for two seasons, from 1923 to 1924, compiling a record of 2–16.

Street was a stand-out football and basketball player and track athlete at Carleton College from 1916 to 1919, until doctors found he had a heart murmur half-way through the football season.

== Head coaching record ==
=== Football ===
Year	Team	Overall	Conference	Standing	Bowl/playoffs
Kalamazoo Baptists (Michigan Intercollegiate Athletic Association) (1923–1924)
1923	Kalamazoo	0–10	0–5	6th	
1924	Kalamazoo	2–6	0–5	6th	
Kalamazoo:		2–16	0–10		
Total:		2–16			
