= 1923 North Dakota Flickertails football team =

American college football season

1923 North Dakota Flickertails football
- Conference: North Central Conference
- Record: 5–3 (2–1 NCC)
- Head coach: Paul J. Davis (5th season)

1923 North Central Conference football standings
	Conf.					Overall
Team	W		L		T	W		L		T
Morningside $	3	–	1	–	0	5	–	2	–	0
North Dakota	2	–	1	–	0	5	–	3	–	0
Des Moines	2	–	1	–	1	5	–	4	–	1
South Dakota State	2	–	3	–	0	3	–	4	–	0
Creighton	1	–	2	–	0	5	–	5	–	0
North Dakota Agricultural	1	–	2	–	0	2	–	4	–	1
South Dakota	1	–	3	–	1	4	–	3	–	1
Nebraska Wesleyan *	1	–	0	–	1	6	–	1	–	2
$ – Conference champion; * – ineligible for conference title; too few games played

The 1923 North Dakota Flickertails football team, also known as the Nodaks, was an American football team that represented the University of North Dakota as a member of the North Central Conference (NCC) during the 1923 college football season. In their fifth year under head coach Paul J. Davis, the Flickertails compiled a 5–3 record (2–1 against NCC opponents), finished in second place out of eight teams in the NCC, and outscored opponents by a total of 157 to 92. The team played its home games at the University field.

== Schedule ==
Date	Opponent	Site	Result	Attendance	Source
September 29	Moorhead Normal	University field; Grand Forks, ND	W 30–6		
October 6	Jamestown	University field; Grand Forks, ND	W 89–7		
October 13	South Dakota^{†}	University field; Grand Forks, ND (rivalry)	L 6–13		
October 20	at Minnesota	Northrop Field; Minneapolis, MN	L 0–27	14,000	
October 27	North Dakota Agricultural	University field; Grand Forks, ND (rivalry)	W 10–3		
November 3	at South Dakota State	Brookings, SD	W 12–6		
November 10	at Marquette	Milwaukee, WI	L 0–27		
November 17	at Carleton	Northfield, MN	W 10–3		
^{†}Homecoming
