= 1923 University of Akron football team =

American college football season

1923 Akron football
- Conference: Ohio Athletic Conference
- Record: 4–3–1 (2–3–1 OAC)
- Head coach: Fred Sefton (9th season)
- Captain: Ed Kregenow
- Home stadium: Buchtel Field

1923 Ohio Athletic Conference football standings
	Conf.					Overall
Team	W		L		T	W		L		T
Wooster $	8	–	0	–	0	9	–	0	–	0
Ohio Wesleyan	5	–	0	–	0	6	–	2	–	0
Wittenberg	5	–	1	–	0	7	–	1	–	0
Hiram	5	–	2	–	0	5	–	2	–	0
Cincinnati	5	–	2	–	0	6	–	3	–	0
Otterbein	4	–	3	–	0	5	–	3	–	0
Western Reserve	5	–	4	–	0	5	–	4	–	0
Muskingum	3	–	3	–	0	5	–	3	–	0
Oberlin	3	–	3	–	1	4	–	3	–	1
Mount Union	3	–	3	–	0	5	–	4	–	0
Denison	2	–	2	–	2	3	–	3	–	2
Ohio Northern	3	–	4	–	0	6	–	4	–	0
Akron	2	–	3	–	1	4	–	3	–	1
Ohio	2	–	4	–	1	3	–	5	–	1
St. Xavier	1	–	2	–	0	4	–	4	–	0
Miami (OH)	1	–	4	–	1	3	–	4	–	1
Kenyon	1	–	5	–	0	1	–	6	–	0
Heidelberg	0	–	5	–	0	3	–	5	–	0
Case	0	–	8	–	0	0	–	9	–	0
$ – Conference champion

The 1923 Akron football team was an American football team that represented the University of Akron in the Ohio Athletic Conference (OAC) during the 1923 college football season. In its ninth season under head coach Fred Sefton, the team compiled a 4–3–1 record (2–3–1 against conference opponents) and outscored opponents by a total of 92 to 37. Quarterback Ed Kregenow was the team captain.

== Schedule ==
Date	Opponent	Site	Result	Source
October 6	Kent State*	Buchtel Field; Akron, OH (rivalry)	W 32–0	
October 13	Toledo*	Buchtel Field; Akron, OH	W 10–3	
October 20	at Denison	Granville, OH	L 0–7	
October 27	Mount Union	Buchtel Field; Akron, OH	W 17–0	
November 3	at Ohio Northern	Ada, OH	W 20–0	
November 10	Wooster	Buchtel Field; Akron, OH	L 0–8	
November 17	at Miami (OH)	Miami Field; Oxford, OH	T 13–13	
November 24	Ohio Wesleyan	Buchtel Field; Akron, OH	L 0–6	
*Non-conference game
