= 1923 Ohio Green and White football team =

American college football season

1923 Ohio Green and White football
- Conference: Ohio Athletic Conference
- Record: 3–5–1 (2–4 OAC)
- Head coach: John C. Heldt (1st season)

1923 Ohio Athletic Conference football standings
	Conf.					Overall
Team	W		L		T	W		L		T
Wooster $	8	–	0	–	0	9	–	0	–	0
Ohio Wesleyan	5	–	0	–	0	6	–	2	–	0
Wittenberg	5	–	1	–	0	7	–	1	–	0
Hiram	5	–	2	–	0	5	–	2	–	0
Cincinnati	5	–	2	–	0	6	–	3	–	0
Otterbein	4	–	3	–	0	5	–	3	–	0
Western Reserve	5	–	4	–	0	5	–	4	–	0
Muskingum	3	–	3	–	0	5	–	3	–	0
Oberlin	3	–	3	–	1	4	–	3	–	1
Mount Union	3	–	3	–	0	5	–	4	–	0
Denison	2	–	2	–	2	3	–	3	–	2
Ohio Northern	3	–	4	–	0	6	–	4	–	0
Akron	2	–	3	–	1	4	–	3	–	1
Ohio	2	–	4	–	1	3	–	5	–	1
St. Xavier	1	–	2	–	0	4	–	4	–	0
Miami (OH)	1	–	4	–	1	3	–	4	–	1
Kenyon	1	–	5	–	0	1	–	6	–	0
Heidelberg	0	–	5	–	0	3	–	5	–	0
Case	0	–	8	–	0	0	–	9	–	0
$ – Conference champion

The 1923 Ohio Green and White football team represented Ohio University as a member of the Ohio Athletic Conference (OAC) during the 1923 college football season. Led by first-year head coach John C. Heldt, the Green and White compiled an overall record of 3–5–1 with a mark of 2–4 in conference play.

== Schedule ==
Date	Opponent	Site	Result	Source
September 29	Rio Grande*	Athens, OH	W 20–0	
October 6	at Oberlin	Oberlin, OH	L 0–6	
October 13	at St. Xavier	Corcoran Field; Cincinnati, OH	L 7–15	
October 20	Cincinnati	Athens, OH	L 7–13	
October 26	Western Reserve	Athens, OH	W 7–0	
November 3	Kenyon	Athens, OH	W 14–0	
November 10	at Ohio Wesleyan	Delaware, OH	L 0–40	
November 17	at Denison	Granville, OH	T 7–7	
November 29	Marietta*	Athens, OH	L 3–7	
*Non-conference game
