= 1923 Miami Redskins football team =

American college football season

1923 Miami Redskins football
- Conference: Ohio Athletic Conference
- Record: 3–4–1 (1–4–1 OAC)
- Head coach: Harry W. Ewing (2nd season)
- Home stadium: Miami Field

1923 Ohio Athletic Conference football standings
	Conf.					Overall
Team	W		L		T	W		L		T
Wooster $	8	–	0	–	0	9	–	0	–	0
Ohio Wesleyan	5	–	0	–	0	6	–	2	–	0
Wittenberg	5	–	1	–	0	7	–	1	–	0
Hiram	5	–	2	–	0	5	–	2	–	0
Cincinnati	5	–	2	–	0	6	–	3	–	0
Otterbein	4	–	3	–	0	5	–	3	–	0
Western Reserve	5	–	4	–	0	5	–	4	–	0
Muskingum	3	–	3	–	0	5	–	3	–	0
Oberlin	3	–	3	–	1	4	–	3	–	1
Mount Union	3	–	3	–	0	5	–	4	–	0
Denison	2	–	2	–	2	3	–	3	–	2
Ohio Northern	3	–	4	–	0	6	–	4	–	0
Akron	2	–	3	–	1	4	–	3	–	1
Ohio	2	–	4	–	1	3	–	5	–	1
St. Xavier	1	–	2	–	0	4	–	4	–	0
Miami (OH)	1	–	4	–	1	3	–	4	–	1
Kenyon	1	–	5	–	0	1	–	6	–	0
Heidelberg	0	–	5	–	0	3	–	5	–	0
Case	0	–	8	–	0	0	–	9	–	0
$ – Conference champion

The 1923 Miami Redskins football team was an American football team that represented Miami University as a member of the Ohio Athletic Conference (OAC) during the 1923 college football season. In its second and final season under head coach Harry W. Ewing, Miami compiled a 3–4–1 record (1–4–1 against conference opponents) and finished in 16th place out of 19 teams in the OAC.

== Schedule ==
Date	Opponent	Site	Result	Attendance	Source
September 29	Georgetown (KY)*	Miami Field; Oxford, OH	W 22–0		
October 6	Alumni-frosh*	Miami Field; Oxford, OH	W 25–6		
October 13	at Wooster	Severance Stadium; Wooster, OH	L 0–13	5,000	
October 20	Oberlin	Miami Field; Oxford, OH	L 7–13		
October 27	vs. Denison	Dayton, OH	W 9–6		
November 10	at Mount Union	Alliance, OH	L 6–7		
November 17	Akron	Miami Field; Oxford, OH	T 13–13		
November 23	at Cincinnati	Nippert Stadium; Cincinnati, OH (Victory Bell)	L 0–23		
*Non-conference game
