= Willie Flattery =

American football player (1904–1957)

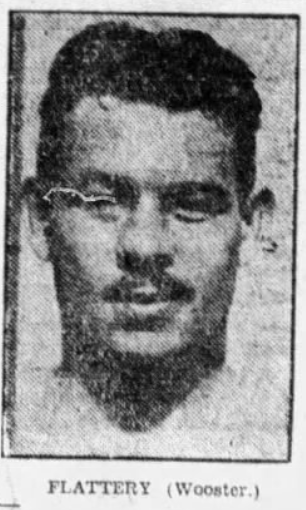

No. 6
- Positions: Guard, end

Personal information
- Born: February 4, 1904; Wooster, Ohio, U. S.
- Died: April 4, 1957 (aged 53); Wooster, Ohio, U. S.
- Listed height: 5 ft 11 in (1.80 m)
- Listed weight: 220 lb (100 kg)

Career information
- High school: Wooster (Wooster, Ohio)
- College: Wooster

Career history
- Canton Bulldogs (1925–1926)

Career statistics
- Games played: 16
- Games started: 14
- Stats at Pro Football Reference

Wilson Immel Flattery (February 4, 1904 – April 5, 1957) was an American football player. He played college football at the College of Wooster before playing professionally in the National Football League (NFL) with the Canton Bulldogs during the 1925 and 1926 seasons.
