= Milton Olander =

American football player and coach (1899–1961)

- Olander, 1922

Biographical details
- Born: January 25, 1899; Rockford, Illinois, U.S.
- Died: December 30, 1961 (aged 62); Toledo, Ohio, U.S.

Playing career
- 1918–1921: Illinois
- Position: Tackle

Coaching career (HC unless noted)
- 1922–1923: Western State Nromal
- 1924–1934: Illinois (assistant)

Head coaching record
- Overall: 12–1–1

Milton Martin Olander (January 25, 1899 – December 30, 1961) was an American college football player and coach.

Olander was born in 1899 at Rockford, Illinois. His father, Frank Olander, emigrated from Sweden in 1881 and became a saloon keeper in Rockford. His mother, Selma Olander, emigrated from Sweden in 1888. He had two older brothers, Carl (born May 1895) and Clarence (born April 1897).

Olander graduated from Rockford High School, where he played on the football, basketball and track teams. He also served as captain of the football team for two years. He next enrolled at the University of Illinois where he played at the tackle position for Robert Zuppke's Fighting Illini football teams from 1918 to 1921. The University of Illinois yearbook noted: "'Milt' was the leading factor in the Illini line. His steadiness characterized him as Zup's most heady player. This was his fourth season."

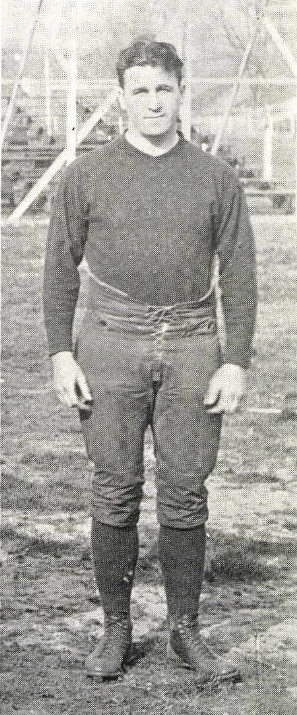
Olander from the 1924 Brown and Gold

At the time of the 1920 United States census, Olander was working as a laborer in a warehouse and living in Rockford with his mother, his older brother Clarence, and his younger sister Alice.

After graduating from Illinois, Olander served as the head football coach at the Western State Normal School (now known as Western Michigan University) in 1922 and 1923. In his first year as a head coach, he led Western State to a perfect 6–0 record as his team outscored its opponents 160 to 0.

In April 1924, Olander signed a contract to return to the University of Illinois as the freshman football coach. He served as an assistant football coach at Illinois through the 1934 season.

At the time of the 1930 United States census, Olander was living in Champaign, Illinois with his wife Mary S. Olander, daughter Suzanne Olander, and son Milton M. Olander Jr. His occupation at that time was listed as an assistant coach for a university.

In 1940, Olander was appointed as the head of the Athletic Board of Control at the University of Illinois.

Olander lived in Sylvania, Ohio in his later years. He worked as the director of industrial relations for Owens-Illinois Glass Co. at Toledo, Ohio. In 1953, he was offered a position as an Assistant Secretary of Labor in the administration of President Dwight Eisenhower.

Olander died in December 1961 at Toledo at the age of 62.

Olander was one of the original members of the parks commission in Sylvania, Ohio. In recognition of his efforts, the city's park system is known as The Olander Park System. The city's largest park, Olander Park, and its lake, Lake Olander, are also named after him.

== Head coaching record ==
Year	Team	Overall	Conference	Standing	Bowl/playoffs
Western State Normal Hilltoppers (Independent) (1922–1923)
1922	Western State Normal	6–0			
1923	Western State Normal	6–1–1			
Western State Normal:		12–1–1			
Total:		12–1–1			
