= Vivian Hultman =

American football player (1903–1987)

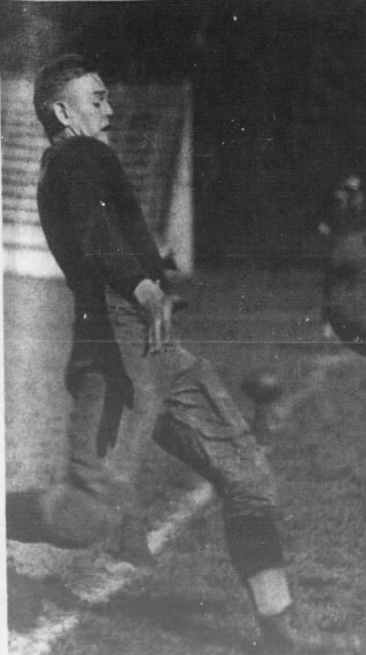
- Hultman kicking a football in college

No. 7, 16
- Position: End

Personal information
- Born: January 26, 1903; Grand Rapids, Michigan, U.S.
- Died: December 27, 1987 (aged 84); Largo, Florida, U.S.
- Listed height: 5 ft 8 in (1.73 m)
- Listed weight: 178 lb (81 kg)

Career information
- High school: Union (Grand Rapids, Michigan)
- College: Michigan State

Career history
- Detroit Panthers (1925–1926); Pottsville Maroons (1927)

Career statistics
- Games played: 28 or 30 (Note: Sources conflict.)
- Games started: 21
- Touchdowns: 3
- Stats at Pro Football Reference

Vivian Joseph Hultman (January 26, 1903 – December 27, 1987) was an American football player from Grand Rapids, Michigan. After graduating from Union High School in Grand Rapids, he enrolled at Michigan Agricultural College (now known as Michigan State University). He played college football for the Michigan Agricultural Aggies and was the team captain in 1924. He also played for the school's basketball team. Hultman then played professionally in the National Football League (NFL) with the Detroit Panthers from 1925 through 1926 and the Pottsville Maroons in 1927.

== Early life ==
Hultman was born on January 26, 1903, in Grand Rapids, Michigan. He attended Union High School in Grand Rapids and played football and basketball there from 1918 to 1921. He was named third-team all-tournament at the 1920–21 state basketball championship. He graduated in 1921 and began attending Michigan Agricultural College (now known as Michigan State University) later that year.

== College career ==
In his first year at Michigan Agricultural, 1921, Hultman played left guard for the freshman football team and was named one of the school's "All-Freshman" players. He also played for the freshman basketball squad and one year later became a varsity letterman and starter at forward for the team. In the 1922 football season, Hultman became a starter at guard before later being switched to end; he also served as the team's punter.

Hultman returned to the basketball team for the 1922–23 season, while in the 1923 football season he played every game while shifting from end to guard to tackle. Following the 1923 season, Hultman was elected the team captain for the football team in 1924. He helped the Aggies compile a record of 5–3; each of their wins were by several scores, including some blowouts such as a 59–0 win over North-Western College, while each of their losses were one-score games, including a close 7–0 loss to rival Michigan. Despite the team's loss in their game against Michigan, the Associated Press called Hultman the "hero of the game" and noted that he "added absolute security to his side of the line and his leadership accounted largely for the fighting spirit of the green clad warriors".

Hultman played a final season with the basketball team in the 1924–25 season and scored points in every game. An engineering student, he graduated in 1925. The Lansing State Journal summed up his football career as "one of the most versatile linemen ever turned out at [Michigan Agricultural]".

== Professional career ==
Hultman was signed by the Detroit Panthers of the National Football League (NFL) on September 30, 1925, after injuries to Tom Hogan and Frank Bowler. Signed after the second game of the season, he went on to start all 11 remaining games at end, helping the Panthers place third in the league with a record of 8–2–2. He was among the first five NFL players from his college, a school that has since produced over 300 NFL alumni. In a 21–0 win against the Milwaukee Badgers, Hultman caught a 30-yard pass from Dick Vick for his first career touchdown.

Hultman returned to the Panthers in 1926 and played between nine and 10 games, five as a starter at end and guard, scoring one touchdown while Detroit compiled a record of 4–6–2 for a 12th-place finish. He signed with the Pottsville Maroons at the start of the 1927 season. He appeared in eight or nine games, five as a starter, recording a 21-yard touchdown catch from Frank Kirkleski while the Maroons were 5–8 in league play. The Maroons were the last team of his career, and thus Hultman ended his three-year stint in the NFL with between 28 and 30 games played, 21 starts, and three receiving touchdowns.

== Personal life and death ==
Hultman had a younger brother who played football. He received a five-day jail sentence in May 1926 for driving while intoxicated. He later lived in Waukegan, Illinois, and was an insurance agent at Northwest International. He served in World War II. Hultman was a president of the Waukegan School Board and was a member of the Glen Flora Country Club there.

Hultman moved to St. Petersburg, Florida, in 1982, and was a member of the Seminole Lake Country Club and First Church of Christ, Scientist, Seminole. He was married and had one son. He died on December 27, 1987, in Largo, Florida, at the age of 84.
