= Dan J. Savage =

American sports coach (1890–1931)

Biographical details
- Born: January 13, 1890; Cleveland, Ohio, U.S.
- Died: February 1, 1931 (aged 41); Hamilton, Ohio, U.S.

Playing career

Football
- c. 1910: St. Ignatius (OH)

Coaching career (HC unless noted)

Football
- 1919–1921: St. Louis University HS (MO)
- 1923–1925: Saint Louis
- 1926–1930: St. Xavier HS (OH)

Basketball
- 1922–1926: Saint Louis
- 1926–1931: St. Xavier HS (OH)

Baseball
- 1925–1926: Saint Louis

Administrative career (AD unless noted)
- c. 1925: Saint Louis

Head coaching record
- Overall: 13–13–1 (college football); 36–13 (college basketball); 10–3 (college baseball)

Daniel Joseph Savage (January 13, 1890 – February 1, 1931) was an American football, basketball, and baseball coach. He served as the head football coach at Saint Louis University from 1923 to 1925, compiling a record of 13–13–1 Savage was also the head basketball coach at Saint Louis from 1922 to 1926 and the school's head baseball coach from 1925 to 1926. Savage played college football at St. Ignatius College—now known as John Carroll University—in University Heights, Ohio. He died on February 1, 1931, at Mercy Hospital in Hamilton, Ohio, after suffering a skull fracture sustained in a fall down a set of stairs.

== Head coaching record ==
=== Football ===
| Year | Team | Overall | Conference | Standing | Bowl/playoffs |
|---|---|---|---|---|---|
Saint Louis Billikens (Independent) (1923–1925)
| 1923 | Saint Louis | 5–3–1 | | | |
| 1924 | Saint Louis | 6–3 | | | |
| 1925 | Saint Louis | 2–6–1 | | | |
| Saint Louis: | | 13–13–1 | | | |
| Total: | | 13–13–1 | | | |
