= 1923 Cincinnati Bearcats football team =

American college football season

1923 Cincinnati Bearcats football
- Conference: Ohio Athletic Conference
- Record: 6–3 (5–2 OAC)
- Head coach: George McLaren (2nd season)
- Captain: Red Prather
- Home stadium: Carson Field

1923 Ohio Athletic Conference football standings
	Conf.					Overall
Team	W		L		T	W		L		T
Wooster $	8	–	0	–	0	9	–	0	–	0
Ohio Wesleyan	5	–	0	–	0	6	–	2	–	0
Wittenberg	5	–	1	–	0	7	–	1	–	0
Hiram	5	–	2	–	0	5	–	2	–	0
Cincinnati	5	–	2	–	0	6	–	3	–	0
Otterbein	4	–	3	–	0	5	–	3	–	0
Western Reserve	5	–	4	–	0	5	–	4	–	0
Muskingum	3	–	3	–	0	5	–	3	–	0
Oberlin	3	–	3	–	1	4	–	3	–	1
Mount Union	3	–	3	–	0	5	–	4	–	0
Denison	2	–	2	–	2	3	–	3	–	2
Ohio Northern	3	–	4	–	0	6	–	4	–	0
Akron	2	–	3	–	1	4	–	3	–	1
Ohio	2	–	4	–	1	3	–	5	–	1
St. Xavier	1	–	2	–	0	4	–	4	–	0
Miami (OH)	1	–	4	–	1	3	–	4	–	1
Kenyon	1	–	5	–	0	1	–	6	–	0
Heidelberg	0	–	5	–	0	3	–	5	–	0
Case	0	–	8	–	0	0	–	9	–	0
$ – Conference champion

The 1923 Cincinnati Bearcats football team was an American football team that represented the University of Cincinnati as a member of the Ohio Athletic Conference during the 1923 college football season. In their second season under head coach George McLaren, the Bearcats compiled a 6–3 record (5–2 against conference opponents). Red Prather was the team captain. The team played home games at Carson Field in Cincinnati.

== Schedule ==
Date	Time	Opponent	Site	Result	Attendance	Source
September 29		Kentucky Wesleyan*	Carson Field; Cincinnati, OH	W 17–0		
October 6	2:30 p.m.	Kentucky*	Carson Field; Cincinnati, OH	L 0–14		
October 13		at Denison	Granville, OH	L 7–24		
October 20		at Ohio	Athens, OH	W 13–6		
October 27		Wooster	Carson Field; Cincinnati, OH	L 7–20	7,500	
November 3		at Oberlin	Oberlin, OH	W 6–0		
November 10		Ohio Northern	Carson Field; Cincinnati, OH	W 15–7		
November 17		Case	Carson Field; Cincinnati, OH	W 69–0		
November 23		Miami (OH)	Carson Field; Cincinnati, OH	W 23–0		
*Non-conference game; All times are in Eastern time
