= 1923 All-Eastern football team =

American all-star college football team

The 1923 All-Eastern football team consists of American football players chosen by various selectors as the best players at each position among the Eastern colleges and universities during the 1923 college football season.

== All-Eastern selections ==
=== Quarterbacks ===
- George Pfann, Cornell (PGT-1; NT-1, NYS-1)
- Lyle Richeson, Yale (NT-2; NYS-2)
- Jimmy Robertson, Carnegie Tech (PGT-2)

=== Halfbacks ===
- Harry Wilson, Penn State (PGT-1; NT-1; NYS-1)
- Mal Stevens, Yale (NT-1; NYS-1)
- Eddie Tryon, Colgate (PGT-1; NT-2)
- Walter Koppisch, Columbia (NT-2)
- Karl Bohren, Pittsburgh (PGT-2)
- Nick Nardacci, West Virginia (PGT-2)
- Floyd Ramsey, Cornell (NYS-2)
- West, Washington & Jefferson (NYS-2)

=== Fullbacks ===
- Bill Mallory, Yale (PGT-1; NT-1; NYS-1)
- Charles Darling, Boston College (NT-2; NYS-2)
- Jack McBride, Syracuse (PGT-2)

=== Ends ===
- Pete MacRae, Syracuse (PGT-1; NT-1; NYS-1)
- Richard Luman, Yale (PGT-2; NT-1)
- Henry Bjorkman, Dartmouth (NT-2; NYS-1)
- Charlie Berry, Lafayette (PGT-1)
- Stephens, Penn (PGT-2)
- Taylor, Navy (NYS-2)
- Bill Supplee, Maryland (NYS-2)

=== Tackles ===
- Century Milstead, Yale (PGT-1; NT-1; NYS-1)
- Frank Sundstrom, Cornell (PGT-1; NT-1; NYS-2)
- Chester Weiderquist, Washington & Jefferson (PGT-2; NT-2; NYS-1)
- Edwin F. Blair, Yale (PGT-2; NT-2; NYS-2)

=== Guards ===
- Charles Hubbard, Harvard (PGT-2; NT-1; NYS-1)
- Cyril Aschenbach, Dartmouth (PGT-1; NT-2; NYS-2)
- Jim Welsh, Colgate (NT-1; NYS-2)
- Joe Bedenk, Penn State (NT-2; NYS-1)
- Harry Seidelson, Pittsburgh (PGT-1)
- Walter Mahan, West Virginia (PGT-2)

=== Centers ===
- Winslow Lovejoy, Yale (PGT-2; NT-1; NYS-1)
- Edgar Garbisch, Army (PGT-1; NT-2)
- Dolph Eckstein, Brown (NYS-2)

== Key ==
- PGT = Pittsburgh Gazette Times
- NT = Nashua Telegraph, selections made by more than 20 eastern observers
- NYS = New York Sun

== See also ==
- 1923 College Football All-America Team
