= 1923 All-Western college football team =

The 1923 All-Western college football team consists of American football players selected to the All-Western teams chosen by various selectors for the 1923 college football season.

== All-Western selections ==
=== Ends ===
- Ray Eklund, Minnesota (WE-1)
- LaVern Dilweg, Marquette (WE-1)
- Frank Rokusek, Illinois (WE-2)
- Lowell Otte, Iowa (WE-2)
- Russell Irish, Wisconsin (WE-3)
- Evar Swanson, Lombard (WE-3)

=== Tackles ===
- Marty Below, Wisconsin (WE-1) (CFHOF)
- Stanley Muirhead, Michigan (WE-1)
- Jerome Kriz, Iowa (WE-2)
- Boni Petcoff, Ohio State (WE-2)
- Eugene Oberst, Notre Dame (WE-3)
- Gowdy, Chicago (WE-3)

=== Guards ===
- Jim McMillen, Illinois (WE-1)
- Lloyd Rohrke, Chicago (WE-1)
- Eldon Haley, Kansas (WE-2)
- Adolph Bieberstein, Wisconsin (WE-2)
- Gay, Minnesota (WE-3)
- Harvey Brown, Notre Dame (WE-3)

=== Centers ===
- Jack Blott, Michigan (WE-1)
- Ralph Claypool, Purdue (WE-2)
- John Lonborg, Kansas (WE-3)

=== Quarterbacks ===
- Hoge Workman, Ohio State (WE-1)
- Red Dunn, Marquette (WE-2)
- Harry Stuhldreher, Notre Dame (WE-3) (CFHOF)

=== Halfbacks ===
- Red Grange, Illinois (WE-1) (CFHOF/PFHOF)
- Don Miller, Notre Dame (WE-1) (CFHOF)
- Dave Noble, Nebraska (WE-2)
- Harry Kipke, Michigan (WE-2) (CFHOF)
- Earl Martineau, Minnesota (WE-3)
- Bill Boelter, Drake (WE-3)

=== Fullbacks ===
- John Levi, Haskell (WE-1)
- Elmer Layden, Notre Dame (WE-2) (CFHOF)
- Merrill Taft, Wisconsin (WE-3)

== Key ==
WE = Walter Eckersall in the Chicago Tribune

CFHOF = College Football Hall of Fame

PFHOF = Pro Football Hall of Fame

== See also ==
- 1923 College Football All-America Team
