= 1923 All-Big Ten Conference football team =

American college football all-star team

The 1923 All-Big Ten Conference football team consists of American football players selected to the All-Big Ten Conference teams chosen by various selectors for the 1923 Big Ten Conference football season.

== Ends ==
- Ray Eklund, Minnesota (BE; NB-1; WE-1)
- Elmer A. Lampe, Chicago (NB-1; WE-2)
- John W. Hancock, Iowa (BE; WE-3)
- Lowell Otte, Iowa (WE-1)
- Russell Irish, Wisconsin (NB-2; WE-3)
- Frank Rokusek, Illinois (NB-2; WE-2)

== Tackles ==
- Marty Below, Wisconsin (BE; NB-1; WE-1)
- Stanley Muirhead, Michigan (BE; NB-1; WE-1)
- Leo Kriz, Iowa (NB-2; WE-2)
- Gowdy, Chicago (NB-2; WE-3)
- Boni Petcoff, Ohio State (WE-2)
- Louis Gross, Minnesota (WE-3)

== Guards ==
- Jim McMillen, Illinois (BE; NB-1; WE-1)
- Adolph Bieberstein, Wisconsin (BE; WE-2)
- George Abramson, Minnesota (NB-1)
- Lloyd Rohrke, Chicago (WE-1)
- Joe Pondelik, Chicago (NB-2)
- Thomas Butler, Indiana (NB-2; WE-3)
- Gay, Minnesota (WE-2)
- Bill Fleckenstein, Iowa (WE-3)

== Centers ==
- Jack Blott, Michigan (BE; NB-1; WE-1)
- Billy Young, Ohio State (NB-2)
- Ralph Claypool, Purdue (WE-2)
- Ralph King, Chicago (WE-3)

== Quarterbacks ==
- Hoge Workman, Ohio State (NB-1; WE-1)
- Irwin Uteritz, Michigan (NB-2)
- Harry A. Hall, Illinois (WE-2)
- Malcolm Graham, Minnesota (WE-3)

== Halfbacks ==
- Red Grange, Illinois (BE; NB-1; WE-1)
- Earl Martineau, Minnesota (BE; NB-1; WE-2)
- Harry Kipke, Michigan (BE [qb]; NB-2; WE-1)
- Bill McElwain, Northwestern (NB-2; WE-3)
- Jack Harris, Wisconsin (WE-2)
- Cully Lidberg, Minnesota (WE-3)

== Fullbacks ==
- Merrill Taft, Wisconsin (BE; NB-1; WE-1)
- Earl Britton, Illinois (NB-2; WE-3)
- John Webster Thomas, Chicago (WE-2)

== See also ==
- 1923 College Football All-America Team

== Key ==
BE = Billy Evans released an all-conference team based on his polling of the conference's head coaches, with eight of ten providing their votes

NB = Norman E. Brown

WE = Walter Eckersall

Bold = first-team selection by a majority of the selectors listed above
