= 1923 All-America college football team =

Official list of the best college football players of 1923

The 1923 All-America college football team is composed of college football players who were selected as All-Americans by various organizations and writers that chose All-America college football teams in 1923. The only two selectors recognized by the NCAA as "official" for the 1923 season are Walter Camp, whose selections were published in Collier's Weekly, and Football World magazine. Additional selectors who chose All-American teams in 1923 include Athletic World magazine, selected by 500 coaches, Norman E. Brown, sports editor of the Central Press Association, and Davis J. Walsh, sports editor for the International News Service.

The consensus All-Americans recognized by the NCAA include: halfback Red Grange of Illinois, known as "The Galloping Ghost" and who in 2008 was named by ESPN as the best college football player of all time; halfback Harry Wilson of Penn State, who was later inducted into the National Lacrosse Hall of Fame; quarterback George Pfann of Cornell, who later became a Rhodes scholar; end Lynn Bomar of Vanderbilt, who became one of the first Southern players to be recognized as a consensus All-American; tackle Marty Below of Wisconsin, who Red Grange called "the greatest lineman that I ever played against"; and center Jack Blott of Michigan, who later played professional baseball for the Cincinnati Reds.

== Consensus All-Americans ==
For the year 1923, the NCAA recognizes two All-American teams as "official" designations for purposes of its consensus determinations. The following chart identifies the NCAA-recognized consensus All-Americans and displays which first-team designations they received.

Name	Position	School	Number - Official	Official	Other	Number - Total
Century Milstead	Tackle	Yale	2/2	FW, WC	AW, DW, LP, NB, PH, TT	8/8
George Pfann	Quarterback	Cornell	2/2	FW, WC	AW, DW, LP, NB, PH, TT	8/8
Red Grange	Halfback	Illinois	2/2	FW, WC	AW, DW, LP, NB, PH, TT	8/8
Charles Hubbard	Guard	Harvard	2/2	FW, WC	AW, DW, LP, NB, PH	7/8
Pete MacRae	End	Syracuse	1/2	FW	AW, DW, LP, NB, PH, TT	7/8
Ray Eklund	End	Minnesota	1/2	FW	AW, LP, NB, PH, TT	6/8
Jack Blott	Center	Michigan	2/2	FW, WC	AW, DW, NB	5/8
Jim McMillen	Guard	Illinois	1/2	FW	AW, DW, NB, TT	5/8
Bill Mallory	Fullback	Yale	1/2	WC	DW, NB, PH, TT	5/8
Marty Below	Tackle	Wisconsin	1/2	FW	AW, DW, NB	4/8
Harry Wilson	Halfback	Penn State	1/2	FW	AW, PH	3/8
Lynn Bomar	End	Vanderbilt	2/2	FW, WC	--	2/8

== All-Americans of 1923 ==
=== Ends ===
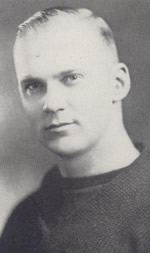
Lynn Bomar of Vanderbilt.

- Lynn Bomar, Vanderbilt (College Football Hall of Fame) (AW-2; WC-1; FW)
- Ray Eklund, Minnesota (AW-1; FW; LP-1; NB-1; DW-2; TT-1; PH-1, BE)
- Pete MacRae, Syracuse (AW-1; WC-2; FW; LP-1; NB-1; DW-1; TT-1; PH-1, BE)
- Homer Hazel, Rutgers (College Football Hall of Fame) (WC-1)
- Henry Wakefield, Vanderbilt (NB-2; DW-1, BE)
- Richard Luman, Yale (AW-3; WC-3; DW-2, BE)
- Bill Supplee, Maryland (LP-2; DW-3; TT-2, BE)
- Charles Tallman, West Virginia (AW-3; WC-2, BE)
- Charlie Berry, Lafayette (AW-2)
- Frank Rokusek, Illinois (LP-2)
- Elmer A. Lampe, Chicago (NB-2)
- Fred Graham, West Virginia (TT-2)
- Edmund Stout, Princeton (WC-3)
- Frank L. Henderson, Cornell (DW-3)
- Wayne Hall, Washington (TT-3)
- Henry Bjorkman, Dartmouth (TT-3)
- John W. Hancock, Iowa (BE)
- Jim Lawson, Stanford (BE)

=== Tackles ===
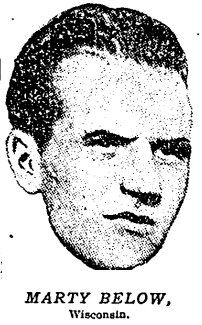
Marty Below

- Century Milstead, Yale (College Football Hall of Fame) (AW-1; WC-1; FW; LP-1; NB-1; DW-1; TT-1; PH-1, BE)
- Marty Below, Wisconsin (College Football Hall of Fame) (AW-1; FW; LP-2; NB-1; DW-1; TT-2, BE)
- Frank Sundstrom, Cornell (AW-2; WC-1; LP-1; NB-2; DW-3; TT-3; PH-1, BE)
- Stanley Muirhead, Michigan (AW-2; LP-2; NB-2, BE)
- Chet Widerquist, Washington & Jefferson (WC-2; TT-2, BE [as g])
- Pappy Waldorf, Syracuse (College Football Hall of Fame) (AW-3; DW-2)
- Stewart "Stew" Beam, California (WC-3; DW-2, BE)
- Henry Bassett, Nebraska (AW-3; WC-3, BE)
- Art Deibel, Lafayette (WC-2)
- Edwin F. Blair, Yale (DW-3)
- Joe Bach, Notre Dame (TT-1)
- Norman Anderson, USC (TT-3)
- Joe Bennett, Georgia (BE)
- Robbie Robinson, Florida (BE)

=== Guards ===
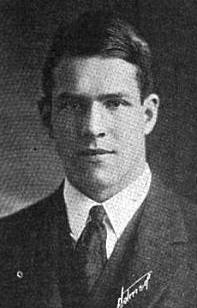
Charles Hubbard

- Charles Hubbard, Harvard (AW-1; WC-1; FW; LP-1; NB-1; DW-1; TT-2; PH-1, BE)
- Jim McMillen, Illinois (AW-1; FW; NB-1; DW-1; TT-1, BE)
- Joe Bedenk, Penn State (AW-2; WC-1; DW-2; TT-3; PH-1, BE)
- Edliff Slaughter, Michigan (LP-1)
- James Welsh, Colgate (AW-2; LP-2; NB-2; DW-2; TT-1)
- August Farwick, Army (AW-3; NB-2; DW-3; TT-2)
- Cyril Aschenback, Dartmouth (AW-3; WC-2; LP-2; TT-3)
- Harvey Brown, Notre Dame (WC-2)
- Arthur G. Carney, Navy (WC-3)
- William Johnson, Texas A&M (WC-3)
- Richard Faville, Stanford (DW-3, BE)
- Goldy Goldstein, Florida (BE)
- Tuck Kelly, Vanderbilt (BE)
- Adolph Bieberstein, Wisconsin (BE)

=== Centers ===
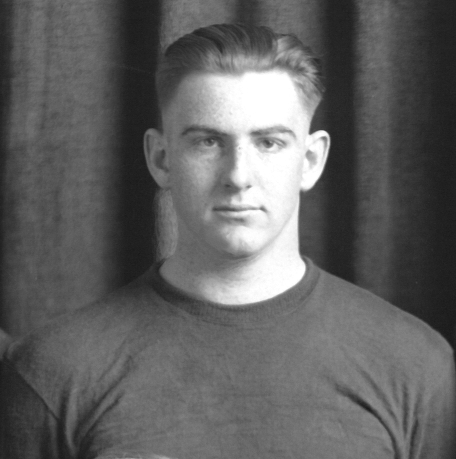
Jack Blott of Michigan.

- Jack Blott, Michigan (AW-1; WC-1; FW; NB-1; DW-1, BE)
- Edgar Garbisch, Army (College Football Hall of Fame) (AW-2; WC-3; NB-2; DW-2; TT-1; PH-1, BE)
- Edwin C. Horrell, California (College Football Hall of Fame) (AW-3; LP-1; DW-3, BE)
- Winslow Lovejoy, Yale (WC-2; LP-2; TT-2, BE)
- Adam Walsh, Notre Dame (TT-3)
- Clyde Propst, Alabama (BE)
- Claire Frye, Georgia Tech (BE)
- Ralph Claypool, Purdue (BE)
- Dolph Eckstein, Brown (BE)

=== Quarterbacks ===
George Pfann

- George Pfann, Cornell (AW-1; WC-1; FW; LP-1; NB-1; DW-1; TT-1; PH-1, BE)
- Lyle Richeson, Yale (WC-2; DW-2; TT-2, BE)
- Hoge Workman, Ohio State (AW-2; NB-2, BE)
- Irwin Uteritz, Michigan (LP-2; DW-3, BE)
- Harry Stuhldreher, Notre Dame (College Football Hall of Fame) (AW-3; TT-3, BE)
- Red Dunn, Marquette (WC-3)
- Herb Covington, Centre (BE)
- Harold Chapman, Oregon (BE)
- Charles Darling, Boston College (BE)

=== Halfbacks ===
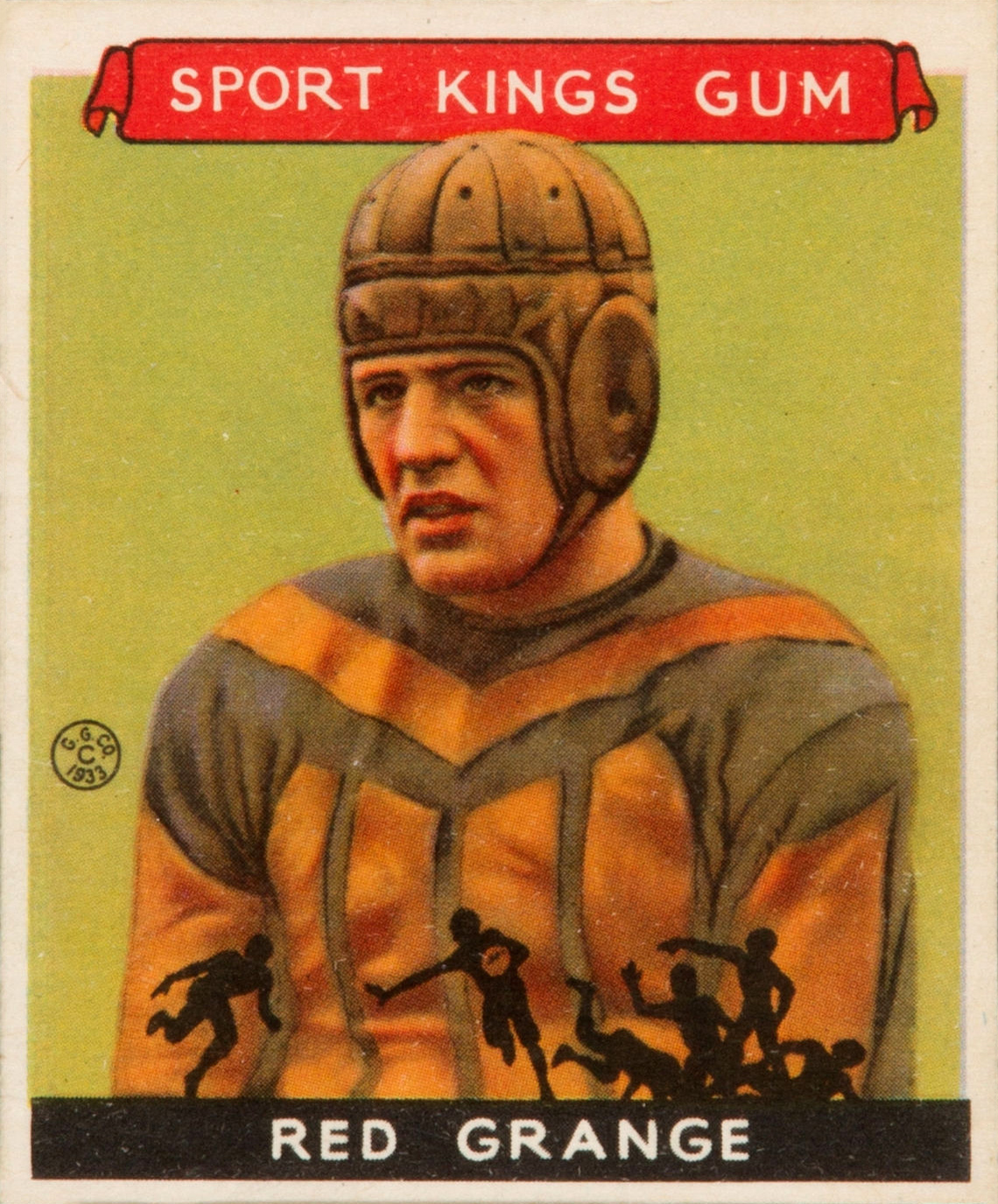
Red Grange of Illinois.

- Red Grange, Illinois (College Football Hall of Fame) (AW-1; WC-1; FW; LP-1; NB-1; DW-1; TT-1; PH-1, BE)
- Harry Wilson, Penn State (College Football Hall of Fame) (AW-1; WC-2; FW; DW-2; TT-2; PH-1, BE)
- Don Miller, Notre Dame (College Football Hall of Fame) (LP-2; NB-1; DW-1; TT-2 [fb], BE)
- Earl Martineau, Minnesota (AW-3; WC-1; NB-2; TT-3 [fb], BE)
- Harry Kipke, Michigan (College Football Hall of Fame) (AW-2; LP-1; TT-3)
- Don Nichols, California (AW-2; TT-1; BE)
- Mal Stevens, Yale (College Football Hall of Fame) (WC-2 [fb]; LP-2; DW-3; TT-3)
- Dave Noble, Nebraska (LP-2; DW-2; TT-2)
- Eddie Tryon, Colgate (AW-3; WC-2; BE)
- Walter Koppisch, Columbia (College Football Hall of Fame) (WC-3)
- Karl Bohren, Pittsburgh (WC-3)
- Gil Reese, Vanderbilt (DW-3, BE)

=== Fullbacks ===
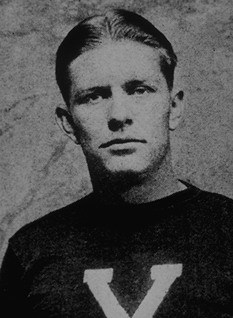
Bill Mallory of Yale

- Bill Mallory, Yale (College Football Hall of Fame) (AW-2; WC-1; NB-1; DW-1; TT-1; PH-1, BE)
- John Levi, Haskell (AW-1; FW, BE)
- Elmer Layden, Notre Dame (College Football Hall of Fame) (LP-1; DW-2, BE)
- Merrill Taft, Wisconsin (LP-2; NB-2, BE)
- Ernie Nevers, Stanford (College and Pro Football Hall of Fame) (AW-3; WC-3, BE)
- John Webster Thomas, Chicago (DW-3)
- Doug Wycoff, Georgia Tech (BE)
- Gus Eckberg, West Virginia (BE)
- Charles E. Cassidy, Cornell (BE)

== Key ==
NCAA recognized selectors for 1923

- WC = Collier's Weekly as selected by Walter Camp
- FW = Football World magazine

Other selectors

- AW = Athletic World magazine, selected by 500 coaches
- NB = Norman E. Brown, sports editor of the Central Press Association
- LP = Lawrence Perry
- DW = Davis J. Walsh, sports editor for the International News Service
- TT = Tom Thorp, for the Baltimore News
- PH = Percy Haughton, Cornell coach
- BE = Billy Evans's "National Honor Roll"

Bold = Consensus All-American

- -1 – First-team selection
- -2 – Second-team selection
- -3 – Third-team selection

== See also ==
- 1923 All-Big Ten Conference football team
- 1923 All-Eastern football team
- 1923 All-Pacific Coast football team
- 1923 All-Southern college football team
- 1923 All-Western college football team
