= William Mallory (disambiguation) =

William Mallory (died 1646) was an English politician.

William Mallory is also the name of:

- William Mallory (fl.1419), Member of Parliament (MP) for Leicestershire
- William Mallory (MP for Huntingdonshire), see Huntingdonshire
- William H. Mallory state legislator in Mississippi
- William L. Mallory Sr. (1931–2013), African-American politician in the Ohio House of Representatives
- Bill Mallory (1935–2018), former American football player and coach
- Bill Mallory (American football, born 1901) (1901–1945), American football player
