= 1924 All-Pro Team =

Official list of the best NFL players in 1924

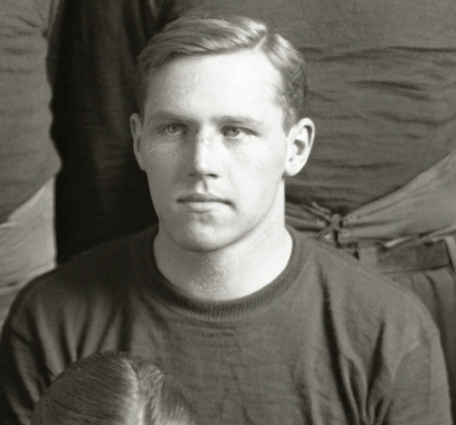
Guard Stanley Muirhead

The 1924 All-Pro Team consists of American football players chosen by various selectors as the best players at their positions for the All-Pro team of the National Football League (NFL) for the 1924 NFL season. Four players were unanimous first-team picks by both known selectors: guard Stanley Muirhead of the Dayton Triangles; quarterback Joey Sternaman of the Chicago Bears; and halfbacks Charley Way of the Frankford Yellow Jackets and Benny Boynton of the Buffalo Bisons.

== Selectors and key ==
For the 1924 season, there are two known selectors of All-Pro Teams. They are:

GB = A poll conducted by the Green Bay Press-Gazette identified first, second, and third teams. The selections were based on polling of 12 sports writers from cities having NFL teams and of six officials who worked NFL games during the season.

CE = Selected by E.G. Brands, a correspondent for Collyer's Eye, a sports journal published in Chicago.

Players selected by both selectors as first-team All-Pros are displayed in bold typeface. Players who have been inducted into the Pro Football Hall of Fame are designated with a "†" next to their names.

== Selections by position ==
=== Ends ===
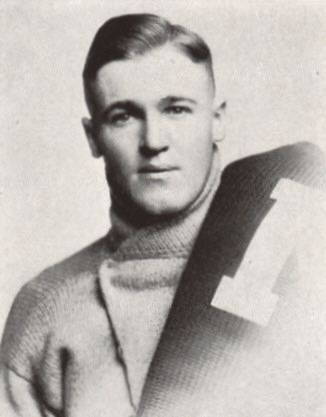
End Guy Chamberlin

Player	Team	Selector(s)
Joe Little Twig	Rock Island Independents	GB-1
Tillie Voss	Green Bay Packers	GB-1
Guy Chamberlin^{†}	Cleveland Bulldogs	GB-3, CE-1
Mike Wilson	Rock Island Independents	CE-1
Paul G. Goebel	Columbus Tigers	GB-2, CE-2
Eddie Anderson	Chicago Cardinals	GB-2
Duke Hanny	Chicago Bears	CE-2
Oscar Christianson	Minneapolis Marines	GB-3

=== Tackles ===
Player	Team	Selector(s)
Ed Healey^{†}	Chicago Bears	GB-1, CE-2
Link Lyman^{†}	Cleveland Bulldogs	GB-2, CE-1
Boni Petcoff	Columbus Tigers	GB-1
Bub Weller	Milwaukee Badgers	CE-1
Duke Slater^{†}	Rock Island Independents	GB-2
Olin Smith	Cleveland Bulldogs	CE-2
Cub Buck	Green Bay Packers	GB-3
Mike Gulian	Frankford Yellow Jackets	GB-3

=== Guards ===
Player	Team	Selector(s)
**Stanley Muirhead**	Dayton Triangles	GB-1, CE-1
Swede Youngstrom	Buffalo Bisons	GB-1
George Berry	Hammond/Akron	CE-1
Doc Williams	Duluth Kelleys	GB-2
Jim McMillen	Chicago Bears	GB-2
Walt LeJeune	Milwaukee Badgers	CE-2
Jim Welsh	Frankford Yellow Jackets	CE-2
Al Nesser	Akron Pros	GB-3
Ralph King	Racine Legion	GB-3

=== Centers ===
Player	Team	Selector(s)
George Trafton^{†}	Chicago Bears	GB-1
Elmer McCormick	Buffalo	CE-1
Andy Nemecek	Columbus Tigers	GB-2
Herb Stein	Frankford Yellow Jackets	CE-2
Carl Peterson	Kansas City Blues	GB-3

=== Quarterbacks ===
Player	Team	Selector(s)
**Joey Sternaman**	Chicago Bears	GB-1, CE-1
Paddy Driscoll^{†}	Chicago Cardinals	GB-2
Hoge Workman	Cleveland Bulldogs	CE-2
Sonny Winters	Columbus Tigers	GB-3

=== Halfbacks ===
Benny Boynton

Player	Team	Selector(s)
**Charley Way**	Frankford Yellow Jackets	GB-1, CE-1
**Benny Boynton**	Buffalo Bisons	GB-1, CE-1
Dave Noble	Cleveland Bulldogs	GB-2
Curly Lambeau^{†}	Green Bay Packers	GB-2
John Hurlburt	Chicago Cardinals	CE-2
Red Dunn	Milwaukee Badgers	CE-2
Joe Guyon^{†}	Rock Island Independents	GB-3
Wayne Brenkert	Akron Pros	GB-3

=== Fullbacks ===
Player	Team	Selector(s)
Tex Hamer	Frankford Yellow Jackets	GB-2, CE-1
Doc Elliott	Cleveland Bulldogs	GB-1
Ken Huffine	Dayton Triangles	CE-2
Hank Gillo	Racine Legion	GB-3
