= 1926 All-Pro Team =

Team of American football players

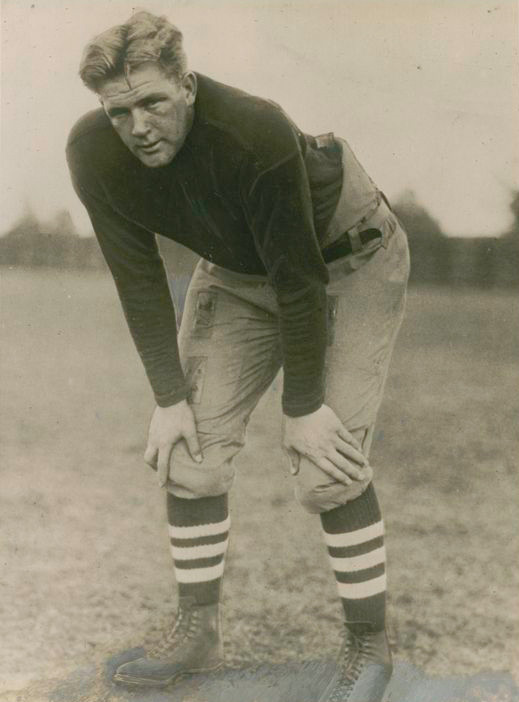
Ernie Nevers

The 1926 All-Pro Team consists of American football players chosen by various selectors at the end of the 1926 season as the best players at their positions for the All-Pro teams of the National Football League (NFL) and American Football League (AFL). Selectors for the 1926 season included the Green Bay Press-Gazette poll, the Chicago Tribune, and Collyer's Eye. Three players were unanimously selected as first-team players by all three selectors: fullback Ernie Nevers, halfback/quarterback Paddy Driscoll, and tackle Ed Healey.

== Selectors and key ==
For the 1926 season, there are three known selectors of All-Pro Teams. They are:

GB = A poll conducted by the Green Bay Press-Gazette identified first and second teams. The selections were limited to NFL players (excluding players in the AFL) and were based on polling of sports editors and pro football managers from 17 of the NFL cities.

CT = The Chicago Tribune's teams were selected by Wilfrid Smith, identified first and second teams, and were composed of both NFL and AFL players.

CE = Selected by E.G. Brands, a correspondent for Collyer's Eye, a sports journal published in Chicago. The selections were limited to NFL players (excluding players in the AFL).

Players selected by multiple selectors as first-team All-Pros are displayed in bold typeface. Players who have been inducted into the Pro Football Hall of Fame are designated with a "†" next to their names.

== Selections by position ==
=== Ends ===
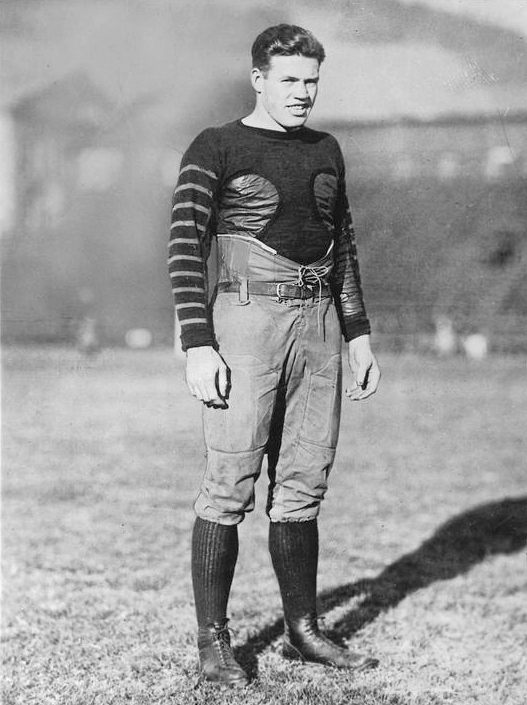
Brick Muller

Player	Team	Selector(s)
**Brick Muller**	Los Angeles Buccaneers	GB-1, CE-1, CT-2
**LaVern Dilweg**	Milwaukee Badgers	GB-2, CE-1, CT-1
Charlie Berry	Pottsville Maroons	GB-1, CE-3
Ray Flaherty	Los Angeles Wildcats	CT-1
Frank Bissell	Akron Pros	GB-2, CE-3
George Tully	Philadelphia Quakers	CT-2
Duke Hanny	Chicago Bears	CE-2

=== Tackles ===
Player	Team	Selector(s)
**Ed Healey**^{†}	Chicago Bears	GB-1, CE-1, CT-1
**Johnny Budd**	Frankford Yellow Jackets	GB-1, CT-1
Walt Ellis	Chicago Cardinals	GB-1
Frank Racis	Pottsville Maroons	CE-1
Steve Owen^{†}	New York Giants	GB-2
John Thurman	Los Angeles Buccaneers	GB-2
Bub Weller	Chicago Cardinals	CT-2
Bull Behman	Philadelphia Quakers	CT-2
Gus Sonnenberg	Detroit Panthers	CE-2

=== Guards ===
Player	Team	Selector(s)
**Jim McMillen**	Chicago Bears	CE-1, CT-1
Gus Sonnenberg	Detroit Panthers	GB-1, CE-2
Jim Welsh	Pottsville Maroons	CE-1
Joy Berquist	Kansas City Cowboys	GB-2
Bill Buckler	Chicago Bears	GB-2, CT-2
Willis Brennan	Chicago Cardinals	CT-2
Doc Alexander	New York Giants	CT-2
Rudy Comstock	Frankford Yellow Jackets	CE-2
Joe Williams	New York Giants	CE-2

=== Centers ===
Player	Team	Selector(s)
George Trafton^{†}	Chicago Bears	CT-1, CE-2
Clyde Smith	Kansas City Cowboys	GB-1
Ralph Claypool	Chicago Cardinals	CE-1
Herb Stein	Pottsville Maroons	GB-2
Doc Alexander	New York Giants	CT-2

=== Quarterbacks ===
Player	Team	Selector(s)
Al Bloodgood	Kansas City Cowboys	GB-2, CE-1
Tut Imlay	Los Angeles Buccaneers	GB-1
Joey Sternaman	Chicago Bulls	CT-2

=== Halfbacks ===
Player	Team	Selector(s)
**Paddy Driscoll**^{†}	Chicago Bears	GB-1, CE-1, CT-1 [QB]
**Verne Lewellen**	Green Bay Packers	GB-1
Eddie Tryon	New York Yankees	CT-1
Tony Latone	Pottsville Maroons	CT-1
Hinkey Haines	New York Giants	GB-2
Curly Oden	Providence Steam Roller	GB-2
Tex Hamer	Frankford Yellow Jackets	CT-2
Wildcat Wilson	Los Angeles Wildcats	CT-2

=== Fullbacks ===
Player	Team	Selector(s)
**Ernie Nevers**^{†}	Duluth Eskimos	GB-1, CE-1, CT-1
Hust Stockton	Frankford Yellow Jackets	GB-2
Al Kreuz	Philadelphia Quakers	CT-2
Cully Lidberg	Green Bay Packers	CE-2
