= 1925 All-Pro Team =

Official list of the best NFL players in 1925

The 1925 All-Pro Team consists of American football players chosen by various selectors as the best players at their positions for the All-Pro team of the National Football League (NFL) for the 1925 NFL season.

== Selectors and key ==
For the 1925 season, there are four known selectors of All-Pro Teams. They are:

GB = A poll conducted by the Green Bay Press-Gazette identified first and second teams. The selections were based on polling of sports editors at a dozen newspapers in the NFL area.

CE = Selected by E.G. Brands, a correspondent for Collyer's Eye, a sports journal published in Chicago.

JC = Joseph Carr, NFL Commissioner (1921–1939)

OSJ = Ohio State Journal, including first and second teams and honorable mentions.

Players selected by multiple selectors as first-team All-Pros are displayed in bold typeface. Players who have been inducted into the Pro Football Hall of Fame are designated with a "†" next to their names.

== Selections by position ==
=== Ends ===
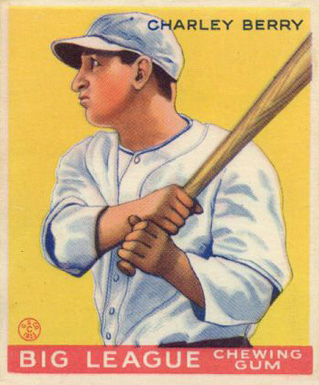
Charlie Berry

Player	Team	Selector(s)
**Charlie Berry**	Pottsville Maroons	GB-1, CE-1, OSJ-1
Lynn Bomar	New York Giants	GB-2, JC
Eddie Lynch	Rochester Jeffersons	GB-1
Paul G. Goebel	Columbus Tigers	JC
Rae Crowther	Frankford Yellow Jackets	CE-1
Gene Mayl	Dayton Triangles	OSJ-1
Duke Hanny	Chicago Bears	CE-2
Eddie Anderson	Chicago Cardinals	CE-2
Frank Culver	Canton Bulldogs	CE-2
Red Maloney	Providence Steamroller	GB-2
Tillie Voss	Detroit	OSJ-2
Joe Little Twig	Rock Island	OSJ-2

=== Tackles ===
Player	Team	Selector(s)
**Ed Healey**^{†}	Chicago Bears	GB-1, CE-1, JC, OSJ-2
**Gus Sonnenberg**	Detroit Panthers	GB-1, OSJ-1
Link Lyman^{†}	Cleveland Bulldogs	CE-2, JC
Duke Slater	Rock Island Independents	GB-2, CE-1
Century Milstead	New York Giants	CE-1
Walt Ellis	Columbus Tigers	OSJ-1
Dick Stahlman	Akron Pros	GB-2
Russ Stein	Pottsville Maroons	CE-2
Chet Widerquist	Rock Island Independents	CE-2
Pete Henry^{†}	Canton Bulldogs	OSJ-2

=== Guards ===
Player	Team	Selector(s)
**Jim McMillen**	Chicago Bears	GB-1, CE-2, OSJ-1
Swede Youngstrom	Cleveland Bulldogs	CE-1, OSJ-2
Art Carney	New York Giants	GB-1
John Alexander	New York Giants	JC
Butch Spagna	Frankford Yellow Jackets	JC
Al Nesser	Akron	OSJ-1
George Abramson	Green Bay Packers	GB-2, OSJ-2
Duke Osborn	Pottsville Maroons	GB-2

=== Centers ===
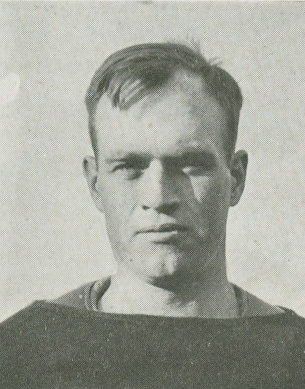
Ralph Claypool

Player	Team	Selector(s)
**Ralph Claypool**	Chicago Cardinals	GB-1, OSJ-1
Herb Stein	Pottsville Maroons	JC
George Trafton^{†}	Chicago Bears	CE-1
Dolph Eckstein	Providence Steamroller	GB-2, OSJ-2

=== Quarterbacks ===
Player	Team	Selector(s)
**Paddy Driscoll**^{†}	Chicago Cardinals	GB-1 [HB], CE-1, OSJ-1
**Joey Sternaman**	Chicago Bears	GB-1, CE-2, JC
Jimmy Robertson	Akron Pros	GB-2

=== Halfbacks ===
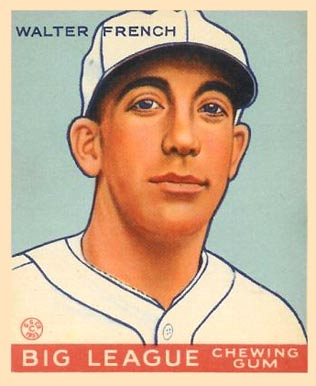
Walter French

Player	Team	Selector(s)
**Walter French**	Pottsville Maroons	CE-1, OSJ-1
Dave Noble	Cleveland Bulldogs	GB-1
Red Grange^{†}	Chicago Bears	JC, OSJ-2 [QB]
Red Barron	Coral Gables Collegians	JC
Heinie Benkert	New York Giants	CE-1
Goldie Rapp	Columbus Tigers	OSJ-1
Jimmy Conzelman^{†}	Detroit Panthers	CE-2
Verne Lewellen	Green Bay Packers	GB-2
Cy Wentworth	Providence Steamroller	GB-2
Buddy Tynes	Columbus	OSJ-2
Hinkey Haines	New York Giants	OSJ-2

=== Fullbacks ===
Player	Team	Selector(s)
**Jack McBride**	New York Giants	GB-1, CE-3, JC, OSJ-1
Barney Wentz	Pottsville Maroons	CE-1
Tex Hamer	Frankford Yellow Jackets	GB-2, CE-2, OSJ-2
Bob Koehler	Chicago Cardinals	CE-2
