= List of Kentucky Wildcats men's basketball head coaches =

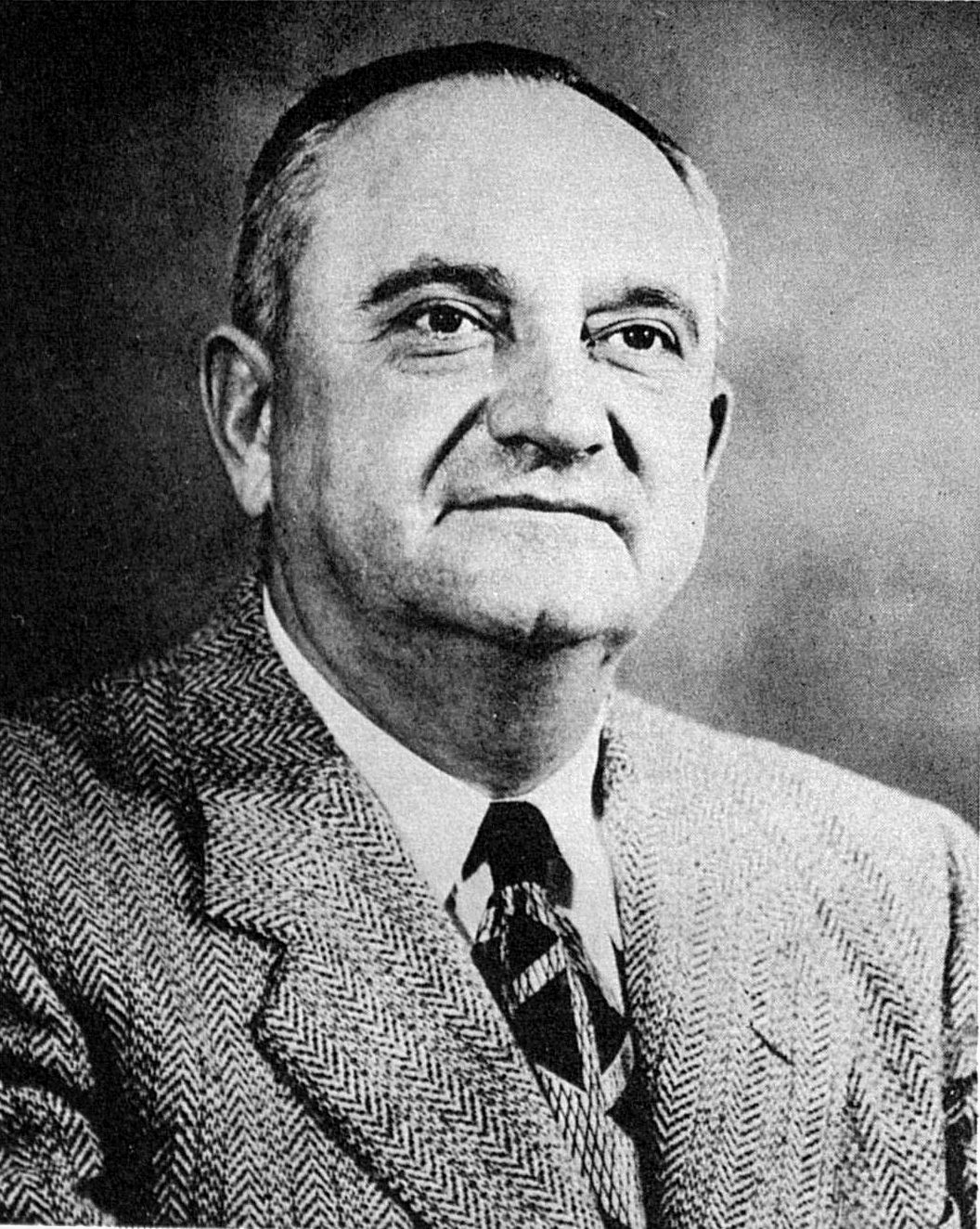
Adolph Rupp is the winningest coach in school history.

The men's basketball team representing the University of Kentucky plays at the Division I level of the National Collegiate Athletic Association (NCAA) in the Southeastern Conference (SEC). The Kentucky Wildcats originally did not play within any athletic conference, before joining the Southern Intercollegiate Athletic Association in 1910. In 1921 they joined the newly established Southern Conference. Eleven years later they would join the SEC as a founding member. The Wildcats play their home games in Rupp Arena, named after their 16th head coach Adolph Rupp. They previously played in Memorial Coliseum, Alumni Gymnasium, Buell Armory Gymnasium, and began their existence playing in State College Gymnasium.

There have been 23 head coaches in the history of Kentucky basketball. The program has played over 3,100 games across 113 seasons from the program's inaugural 1903–04 season to the most recent year, 2022–23. Five Kentucky coaches, the most of any school, have led the team to an NCAA Men's Division I Basketball Championship: Rupp in 1948, 1949, 1951 and 1958; Joe B. Hall in 1978, Rick Pitino in 1996, Tubby Smith in 1998, and John Calipari in 2012. Kentucky also received two retroactive national championships for the 1932-33 and 1933–34 teams coached by Rupp given by the Premo-Porretta Power Poll and Helms Athletic Foundation respectively. Seven coaches have won a conference regular season championship by having the best overall regular season record with the Wildcats: Ray Eklund, Rupp, Hall, Eddie Sutton, Pitino, Smith and Calipari. Seven coaches have won a conference tournament with the Wildcats: George Buchheit, Rupp, Hall, Sutton, Pitino, Smith and Calipari.

Rupp had the longest tenure at Kentucky, coaching for 42 seasons, and is the all-time leader in games coached (1,066) and wins at the school (874). Rupp's 874 wins were the most of any NCAA men's Division I coach at the time of his retirement in 1972. Eklund is the team's all-time leader in winning percentage, with a .833 winning percentage. Statistically, Basil Hayden has been the least successful coach of the Wildcats, with a winning percentage of .187. Five coaches have received national coaching awards while the head coach of Kentucky: Rupp, Sutton, Pitino, Smith, and Calipari. Five Wildcat coaches: Rupp, Sutton, Pitino, Smith, and Calipari have been inducted into the Basketball Hall of Fame.

Kentucky's current head coach is Mark Pope, who has held the position since April 12, 2024.

== Statistics ==
Key
#	Number of coaches
GC	Games coached
OW	Overall Wins
OL	Overall Losses
O%	Winning percentage
CW	Conference Wins
CL	Conference Losses
C%	Winning percentage
RCs	Regular Season Conference Champions
CCs	Conference Tournament Champions
NCs	National Championships
^{♥}	Helms champion
^{‡}	Premo-Porretta Champions
^{♠}	NCAA tournament champion

Coaching awards
^{†}	Elected to the Basketball Hall of Fame
BHOF	Basketball Hall of Fame
NCHOF	National Collegiate Basketball Hall of Fame
LOCA	Legend of Coaching Award
NABC	National Association of Basketball Coaches Coach of the Year
N	Naismith Coach of the Year
USBWA	U.S. Basketball Writers Association Henry Iba Award
AP	Associated Press College Basketball Coach of the Year
SEC	SEC Coach of the Year

Statistics are correct as of the 2021–22 college basketball season.

Coaching awards are only listed if won while the individual was the coach of Kentucky.

Kentucky Wildcats men's basketball head coaches
#	Name	Term	GC	OW	OL	O%	CW	CL	C%	RCs	CCs	NCs	Awards
1	W. W. H. Mustaine and others	1903–1904	56	1	2	.333	—	—	—	—	—	—	—
2	Edwin Sweetland/R.E. Spahr	1909–1910	12	4	8	.333	—	—	—	—	—	—	—
3	Harold Iddings	1910–1911	11	5	6	.454	—	—	—	—	—	—	—
4	Edwin Sweetland	1911–1912	9	9	0	1.000	—	—	—	—	—	—	—
5	John J. Tigert	1912–1913	8	5	3	.625	—	—	—	—	—	—	—
6	Alpha Brumage	1913–1915	26	19	7	.731	—	—	—	—	—	—	—
7	James Park	1915–1916	14	8	6	.571	—	—	—	—	—	—	—
8	William P. Tuttle	1916–1917	10	4	6	.500	—	—	—	—	—	—	—
9	Stanley A. Boles	1917–1918	11	9	2	.792	—	—	—	—	—	—	—
10	Andrew Gill	1918–1919	14	6	8	.428	—	—	—	—	—	—	—
11	George Buchheit	1919–1924	71	44	27	.619	9	8	.529	0	1	—	—
12	Clarence Applegran	1924–1925	21	13	8	.619	6	2	.750	0	0	—	—
13	Ray Eklund	1925–1926	18	15	3	.833	8	0	1.000	1	0	—	—
14	Basil Hayden	1926–1927	16	3	13	.187	1	6	.143	0	0	—	—
15	John Mauer	1927–1930	54	40	14	.740	24	6	.800	5	1	—	—
16	Adolph Rupp^{†}	1930–1972	1066	876	190	.823	399	75	.842	27	13	6: 1933^{♥} 1934^{‡} 1948^{♠} 1949^{♠} 1951^{♠} 1958^{♠}	BHOF (1969) NCHOF (2006) NABC (1966) USBWA (1966) SEC (1964,1966,1968,1969,1970,1971,1972)
17	Joe B. Hall	1972–1985	397	297	100	.748	172	62	.735	8	1	1: 1978^{♠}	SEC (1973,1975,1978,1983)
18	Eddie Sutton^{†}	1985–1989	127	88	39	.693	48	23	.676	1	1	—	BOHF (2020) NCHOF (2011) NABC (1986) AP (1986) SEC (1986)
19	Rick Pitino^{†}	1989–1997	269	219	50	.814	104	28	.788	2	5	1: 1996^{♠}	BHOF (2013) SEC (1990,1991,1996)
20	Tubby Smith	1997–2007	351	268	83	.760	120	40	.750	5	5	1: 1998^{♠}	LOCA (2016) NABC (2003) N (2003) USBWA (2003) AP (2003) SEC (1998, 2003, 2005)
21	Billy Gillispie	2007–2009	67	40	27	.597	20	12	.625	0	0	—	SEC (2008)
22	John Calipari^{†}	2009–2024	532	410	122	.774	198	65	.752	6	6	1: 2012^{♠}	BHOF (2015) NABC (2009,2015) N (2015) AP (2015) SEC (2010,2012,2015,2020)
23	Mark Pope	2024–present	36	24	12	.667	10	8	.555	0	0	—	
Totals			3192	2422	770	0.758	1097	321	0.773	55	33	8	

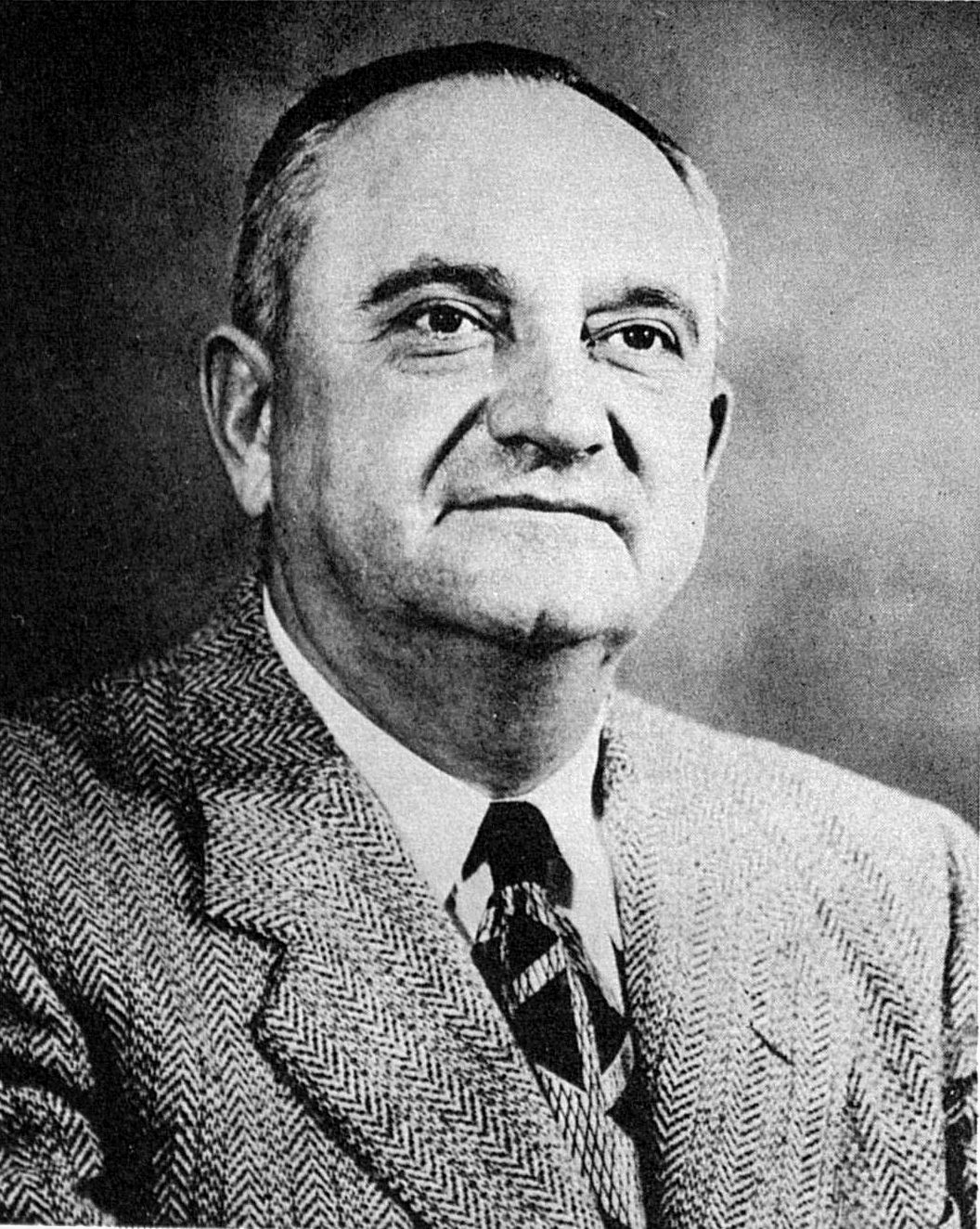
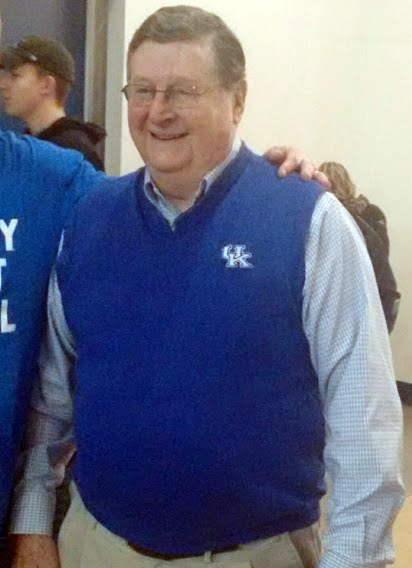
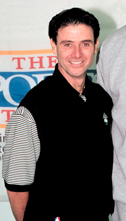
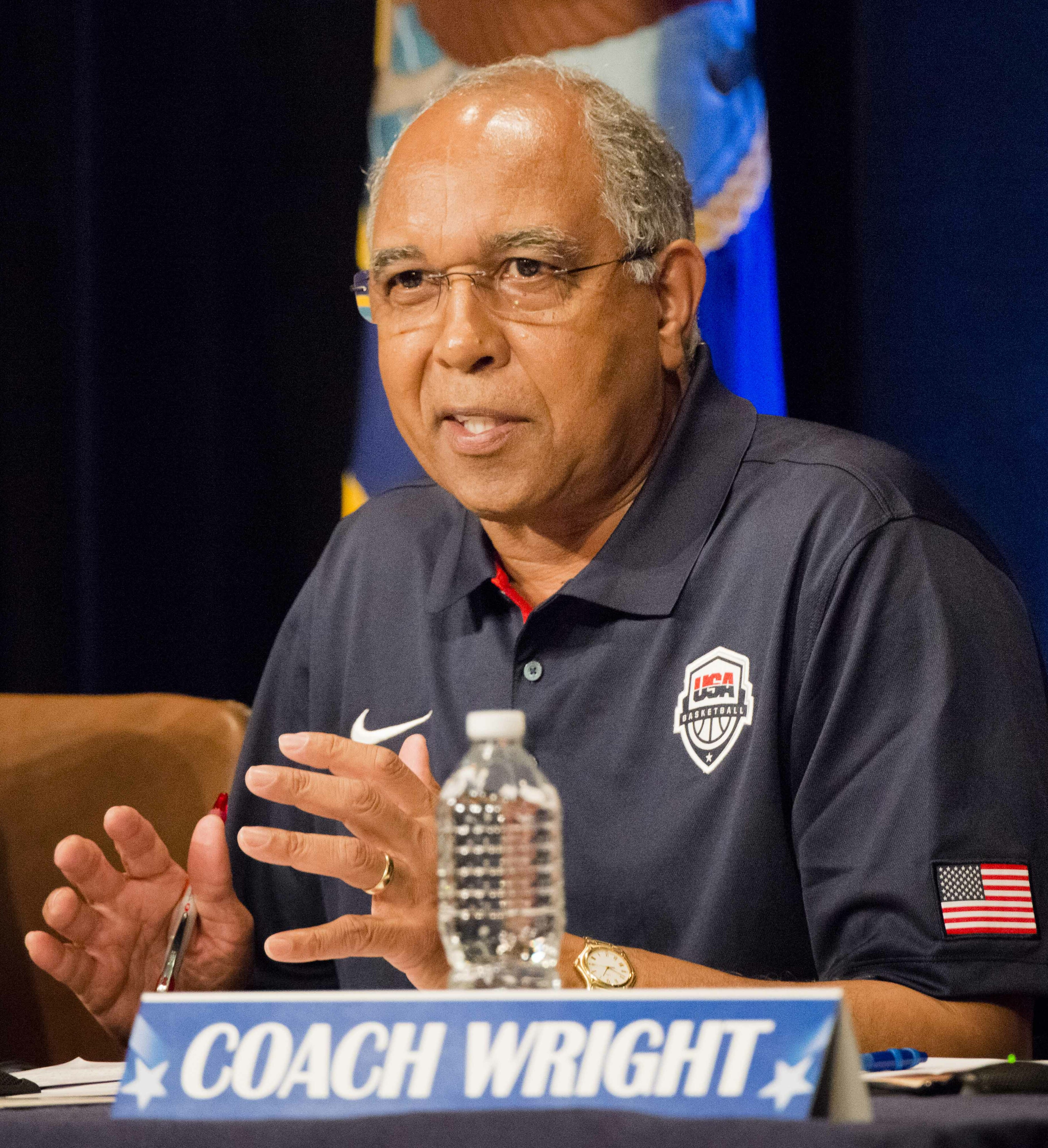
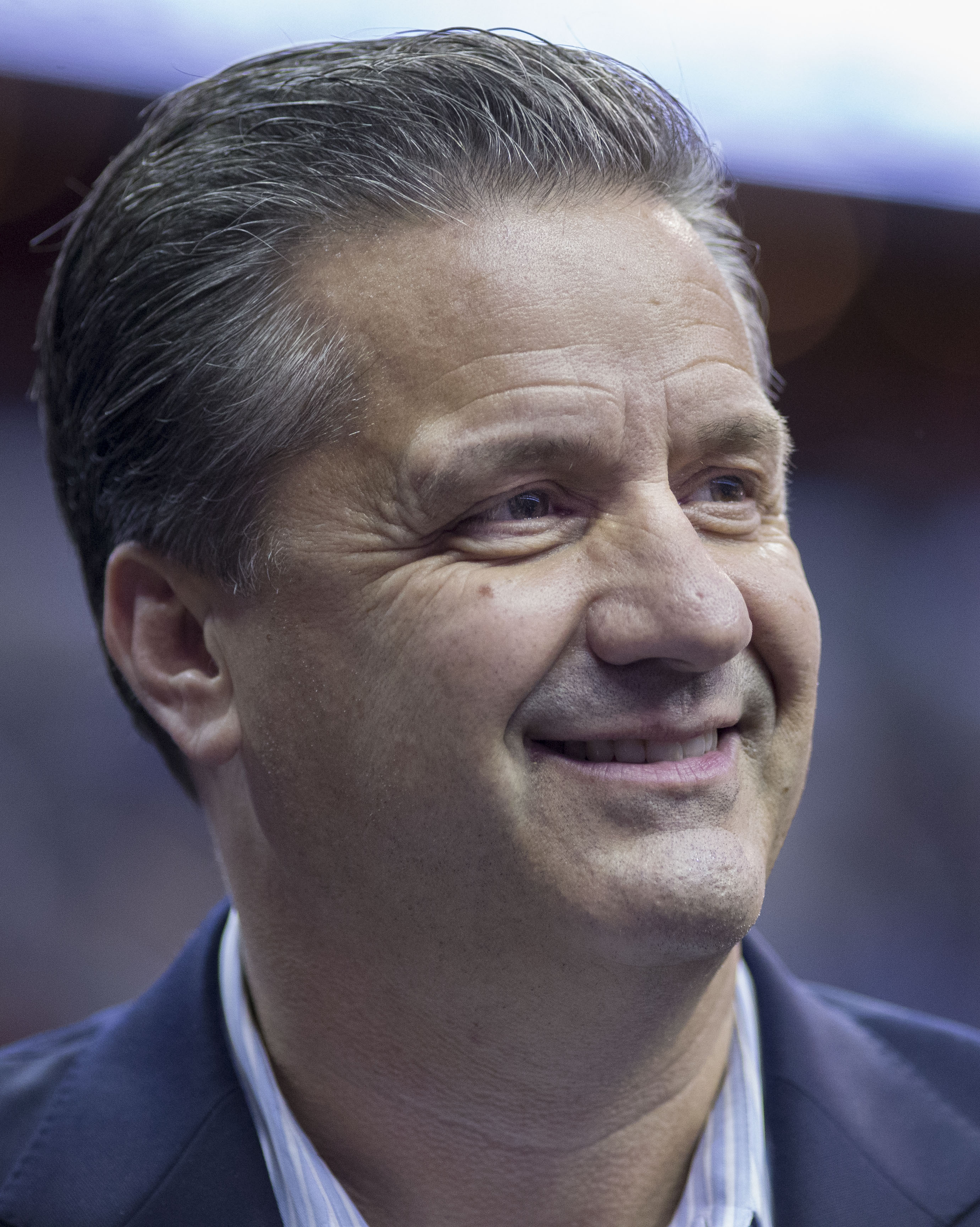
Pictured from left to right: Adolph Rupp, Joe B. Hall, Rick Pitino, Tubby Smith, and John Calipari have all won national championships as the head coach of Kentucky.
