= Gene Mayl (American football) =

American football player and attorney (1901–1986)

- Eugene Mayl, 1940

Profile
- Position: End

Personal information
- Born: October 23, 1901; Dayton, Ohio, U.S.
- Died: July 12, 1986 (aged 84); Dayton, Ohio, U.S.
- Listed height: 6 ft 2 in (1.88 m)
- Listed weight: 198 lb (90 kg)

Career information
- College: Dayton; Notre Dame

Career history
- Dayton Triangles (1925–1926)

Eugene Aloysius Mayl (October 23, 1901 – July 12, 1986) was an American football and basketball player and attorney.

Mayl was born in 1901 in Dayton, Ohio. He began his college education at the University of Dayton. He next attended law school at Notre Dame. While at Notre Dame, he played for the football and basketball teams, serving as captain of the basketball team and winning two letters in football and three in basketball. He played at the end position on Knute Rockne's 1922 and 1923 Notre Dame Fighting Irish football teams. The 1923 team featured the Four Horsemen and compiled a 9–1 record. He graduated from Notre Dame in 1924.

He played professional football in the National Football League (NFL) for the Dayton Triangles from 1925 to 1926. He appeared in 12 NFL games. He was captain of the 1925 Dayton team, and he was selected by the Ohio State Journal as a first-team end on the 1925 All-Pro Team. He also played center for the Redwings and Koors "29" basketball teams.

After his football career ended, Mayl practiced law in Dayton for 60 years. In 1940, he was hired as a special assistant to the U.S. Attorney General tasked with overseeing condemnation proceedings of 500 acres in connection with the expansion of Wright Field into Wright-Patterson Air Force Base. He also served as chairman of Dayton's defense recreation board during World War II.

He later served as president of the Dayton Bar Association and as a member of the executive committee of the Ohio Bar Association.

Mayl died in 1986 in Dayton at age 84.
