= Art Carney (American football) =

American football player (1900–1962)

No. 23, 29
- Position: Offensive lineman

Personal information
- Born: September 23, 1900; New York, New York, U.S.
- Died: March 24, 1962 (aged 61); Bronxville, New York, U.S.
- Listed height: 6 ft 2 in (1.88 m)
- Listed weight: 230 lb (104 kg)

Career information
- College: Navy

Career history
- New York Giants (1925–1926)

Awards and highlights
- First-team All-Pro (1925)
- Stats at Pro Football Reference

Arthur Gerald Carney (September 23, 1900 – March 24, 1962) was an American professional football player who was an offensive lineman for two seasons for the New York Giants.
