= David Lane Tynes =

American football player (1902–1984)

David Lane Tynes Sr.
Profile
- Positions: Fullback, halfback

Personal information
- Born: February 26, 1902; Cooper, Texas
- Died: November 28, 1984 (aged 82); Anchorage, Kentucky
- Listed height: 6 ft 0 in (1.83 m)
- Listed weight: 185 lb (84 kg)

Career information
- High school: Cooper (TX)
- College: Texas

Career history
- Columbus Tigers (1924–1925)

Awards and highlights
- Second-team All-Pro (1925)
- Stats at Pro Football Reference

David Lane Tynes Sr. (February 26, 1902 – November 28, 1984), sometimes known by the nickname "Buddy", was an American football player and medical insurance executive.

Tynes was born in 1902 in Paris, Texas. He attended Cooper High School in Texas.

Tynes played college football for Texas from 1920 to 1923. He was the captain of the undefeated 1923 Texas Longhorns football team.

Tynes also played professional football in the National Football League (NFL) as a fullback and halfback for the Columbus Tigers in 1924 and 1925. He was selected as a second-team halfback on the 1925 All-Pro Team.

After his playing career ended, Tynes moved to Ashland, Kentucky. He was admitted to the Kentucky bar in 1928. He founded the Kentucky Blue Cross insurance program in 1936. He also helped orgnize Kentucky's Blue Shield program in 1948. Tyne was the company's president. Under his leadership, the company grew to more than one million subscribers in Kentucky.

Tynes was married to Corrine Koellein. They had a son, David Lane Tynes Jr. Tynes died in 1984 at age 82 at his home in Anchorage, Kentucky.
