= Andy Nemecek =

American football player (1896–1984)

Profile
- Positions: Guard, center

Personal information
- Born: May 6, 1896; Lorain, Ohio
- Died: May 8, 1984 (aged 88); Mayfield Heights, Ohio
- Listed height: 6 ft 4 in (1.93 m)
- Listed weight: 215 lb (98 kg)

Career information
- High school: Lorain (OH)

Career history
- Columbus Tigers (1923–1925)

Awards and highlights
- Second-team All-Pro (1924)

Andrew James Nemecek (May 6, 1896 – May 8, 1984) was an American football and basketball player.

Nemecek was born in Lorain, Ohio, in 1896 and attended Lorain High School.

He attended Ohio State University and played college football at the center position from 1919 to 1921. He received nine varsity letters in football, basketball, and track. In 1921, he received the Western Conference medal for combined excellence in scholarship and athletics.

He also played three seasons in the National Football League (NFL) as a guard and center for the Columbus Tigers from 1923 to 1925. He was selected as the second-team center on the 1924 All-Pro Team. He also played professional basketball for the Columbus Kinners.

He worked as a surgeon in Shaker Heights, Ohio. He died in 1984 at a nursing home in Mayfield Heights, Ohio.
