= Sonny Winters =

Profile
- Position: Quarterback

Personal information
- Born: June 2, 1900; Napoleon, Ohio, U.S.
- Died: October 5, 1945 (aged 45); Ashland, Kentucky, U.S.
- Listed height: 5 ft 7 in (1.70 m)
- Listed weight: 155 lb (70 kg)

Career information
- High school: V. W. Scott (OH)
- College: Ohio Wesleyan

Career history
- Columbus Tigers (1923–1924)

Awards and highlights
- Third-team All-Pro (1924)

Lingel A. "Sonny" Winters (June 2, 1900 – October 5, 1945) was an American football player born in Napoleon, Ohio.

A recounting by his nephew, Jack Winters, was that Sonny was seen playing basketball in a campus tournament by head football coach George Gauthier which got him recruited to Ohio Wesleyan.

He played two seasons in the National Football League (NFL) as a quarterback for the Columbus Tigers (1923–1924).

He was selected as the third-team quarterback on the 1924 All-Pro Team.
