= Olin Smith =

American football player (1900–1966)

Profile
- Positions: Guard, Tackle

Personal information
- Born: March 25, 1900; Holgate, Ohio, U.S.
- Died: May 4, 1966 (aged 66); Columbus, Ohio, U.S.

Career information
- College: Ohio Wesleyan

Career history
- 1924: Cleveland Bulldogs (1924)

Awards and highlights
- Second-team All-Pro (1924); Collyers Eye Magazine: 2nd Team all-NFL (1924)

Olin Bashford Smith (March 25, 1900 - May 4, 1966) was an American professional football player, who played in 8 games, in the early National Football League (NFL) for the Cleveland Bulldogs in 1924. Prior to his professional career, he played at the college level at Ohio Wesleyan University. In 1962, Smith was inducted into the school's Athletic Hall of Fame.
