= Joe Williams (guard) =

American football player (1896–1949)

No. 23, 25
- Position: Guard

Personal information
- Born: March 3, 1896; New York City, U.S.
- Died: January 18, 1949 (aged 52)

Career information
- College: Lafayette

Career history
- Canton Bulldogs (1923); New York Giants (1925–1926)

Awards and highlights
- NFL champion (1923); Second-team All-Pro (1926)

Career statistics
- Games played: 30
- Games started: 22
- Touchdowns: 1
- Stats at Pro Football Reference

Joseph Alford Williams (March 3, 1896 – January 18, 1949) was an American football guard. He played college football for Lafayette before turning professional. He played for the Canton Bulldogs during the 1923 NFL season and helped the team to the NFL championship. In 1925, Williams signed with the newly founded New York Giants where he went on to play for two seasons. Following the 1926 season, he was named second-team All-Pro by E.G. Brands of the Collyer's Eye sports journal.

In 1926, he appeared in the film The Quarterback.
