= Oscar Christianson =

American football player (1899–1972)

Profile
- Position: End

Personal information
- Born: April 2, 1899; Elbow Lake, Minnesota
- Died: May 19, 1972 (aged 73); St. Anthony, Minnesota
- Listed height: 5 ft 10 in (1.78 m)
- Listed weight: 186 lb (84 kg)

Career information
- High school: Two Harbors (MN)

Career history
- Minneapolis Marines (1921–1924)

Awards and highlights
- Third-team All-Pro (1924)
- Stats at Pro Football Reference

Oscar Clarence Christianson (April 2, 1899 – May 19, 1972) was an American football player. He played four seasons in the National Football League (NFL) as an end for the Minneapolis Marines from 1921 to 1924. He was selected as a third-team end on the 1924 All-Pro Team.
