= Frank Bissell (American football) =

American football player (1902–1983)

Profile
- Position: End

Personal information
- Born: August 15, 1902; Oberlin, Ohio, U.S.
- Died: January 1, 1983 (aged 80); Salina, Kansas, U.S.
- Listed height: 6 ft 1 in (1.85 m)
- Listed weight: 180 lb (82 kg)

Career information
- High school: West (Akron, OH)
- College: Fordham

Career history
- Akron Pros/Indians (1925–1926)

Awards and highlights
- Second-team All-Pro (1926)
- Stats at Pro Football Reference

Franklin H. P. Bissell (August 15, 1902 – January 1, 1983) was an American football player.

Born in Oberlin, Ohio, he attended high school in Akron, Ohio. He then enrolled at Fordham University in 1924 and played college football for the Fordham Rams football team. He next played professional football for the Akron Pros/Indians in the National Football League (NFL) in 1925 and 1926. He appeared in 16 NFL games, 12 of them as a starter. He started all eight games for Akron in 1926 was selected as a second-team player on the 1926 All-Pro Team. The Akron Pros folded after the 1926 season, and Bissell continued playing football thereafter for the South Akron Awnings.

After retiring from football, he worked as a newspaperman with the Cleveland Press. He moved to Salina, Kansas, in the 1970s. He died in Salina in 1983 at age 80.
