= Pete MacRae =

American football and basketball player (1902–1965)

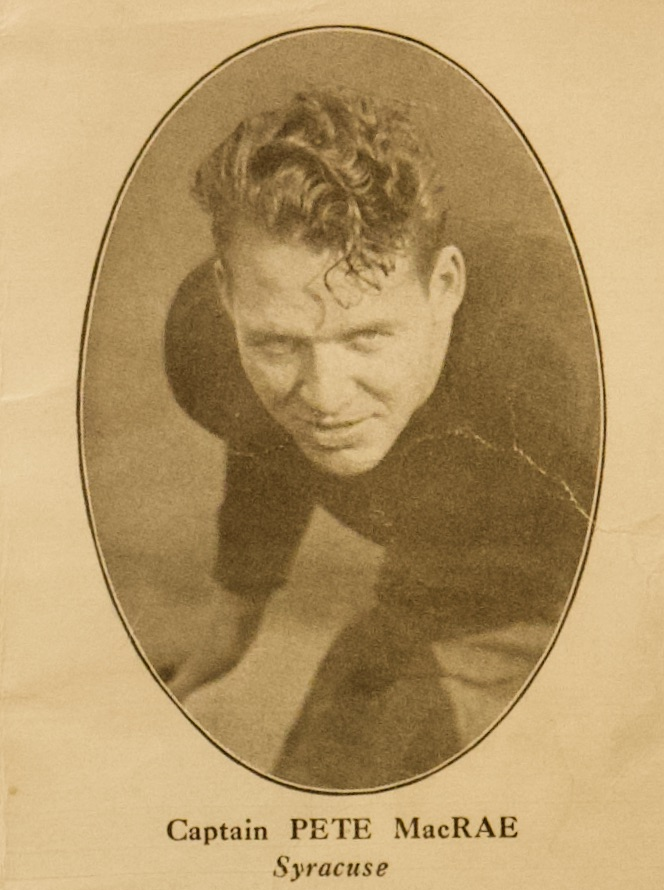
- MacRae in 1923.

Profile
- Position: End

Personal information
- Born: January 22, 1902
- Died: March 1965 (aged 63); Hollywood, Florida
- Listed weight: 180 lb (82 kg)

Career information
- College: Syracuse University

Career history
- 1923: Syracuse Orange

Awards and highlights
- Consensus All-American (1923)

Evander G. "Pete" MacRae (January 22, 1902 – March 1965) was an American football and basketball player. He first gained note as a football player for the undefeated 1919 Allegheny High School football team from Pittsburgh, Pennsylvania. He then enrolled at Syracuse University where played both football and basketball. He played at the end position for the Syracuse Orange football team and was a consensus first-team All-American in 1923. He also played for three years from 1921 to 1924 on the Syracuse Orange men's basketball team. After graduating from Syracuse, he played professional basketball with the Syracuse All Stars.
