= Karl Bohren =

American football player and coach (1902–1987)

Biographical details
- Born: May 26, 1902; Reynoldsville, Pennsylvania, U.S.
- Died: March 11, 1987 (aged 84); Jefferson Hills, Pennsylvania, U.S.

Playing career
- 1922–1923: Pittsburgh
- 1927: Buffalo Bisons
- Position: Halfback

Coaching career (HC unless noted)
- 1924–1925: Saint Vincent
- 1930–1931: Hobert

Accomplishments and honors

Awards
- Third-team All-American (1923)

Karl Wilhelm "Jake" Bohren (May 26, 1902 – March 11, 1987) was an American football player and coach. Wilhelm played college football at the University of Pittsburgh where he was a 1923 All–American.
