= Charles Hubbard (American football) =

American football player

Charles Joseph Hubbard
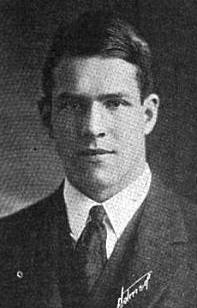

Harvard Crimson
- Position: Guard

Personal information
- Born: 25 June 1902
- Died: 31 July 1950 (aged 48)

Career information
- College: Harvard

Awards and highlights
- 2× Consensus All-American (1922, 1923)

Charles Joseph Hubbard Jr. was an American football player. After attending Milton Academy, he played college football at the guard position for the Harvard Crimson football team from 1921 to 1923. He was a consensus All-American in 1922 and 1923. He was elected team captain for the latter year.

Hubbard was also a member of Harvard's crew team. His father, also Charles Joseph Hubbard, and brother, Wynant Davis Hubbard, both attended Harvard.
