= Edwin F. Blair =

American lawyer

Edwin Foster Blair (1901-1970) was the co-founder of a New York law firm, a member of many corporate boards, a lineman on the undefeated 1923 Yale Bulldogs football team, and an alumni leader at Yale University. He won the 1968 Walter Camp Award.

== Education ==
Edwin F. Blair graduated from Terrill School for Boys in Dallas (a precursor to St. Mark's School of Texas) before spending an additional year at the Hotchkiss School, where he graduated 1920.

He then graduated from Yale University with an AB in 1924. At Yale, he was member of Phi Beta Kappa, Delta Kappa Epsilon and Skull and Bones. He was a tackle for the undefeated 1923 Yale football team; one service named him to a 1923 College Football All-America Team.

Blair then graduated cum laude from Yale Law School.

== Professional ==
In 1928, Blair was hired as an instructor in the Yale Law School. The following year, he joined the New York law firm Davis, Polk, Wardwell, Gardiner & Reed as an associate. In 1940 Blair organized the law firm Blair, Polk & Ogden. Two years later the firm became Blair & Reed. Blair practiced law in New York until 1968.

== Business ==
Blair served on the board of directors of the Canada Dry Corp., Holly Sugar Corporation, Mohasco Industries (later known as Mohawk Industries), and the Union Bag-Camp Paper Corporation (later known as Union Camp Corporation) He was also Chairman of the Board of T.A.D. Jones & Co., Inc. and a member of the advisory board of the Chemical Corn Exchange Bank (later known as Chemical Bank).

== Yale ==
Blair was so heavily involved with Yale University that his The New York Times obituary referred to him as "Mr. Yale." From 1942 to 1944 he was Chairman of the Alumni Fund, and from 1949 to 1952 he was Chairman of the Alumni Board. He was also a Fellow of the Yale Corporation, director of the Yale Football Association and Chairman of the Yale Graduate Football Committee. He received the 1968 Walter Camp Man of the Year award. The year after his death, the Yale football team began awarding the Edwin Foster Blair Award to the team's most valuable player, an award funded by the Yale Club of New York City

== Politics ==
A lifelong Republican, Blair served on the Republican Finance Committee and was a delegate to the Republican National Convention from Connecticut. Blair was a supporter of global governance.

== Personal ==
Blair was born in Weatherford, Texas and grew up in Wichita Falls and then Dallas. His father's business, Anderson & Blair, involved wholesale stock and grocers. Blair's father was also involved in local newspapers and was president of Southwestern National Bank. Blair married Rosemary Kane, of Dallas, in 1925. They went on to have five children. In addition to his decades of service to Yale, Blair served on the board of trustees of the Hotchkiss School and the Fairfield Country Day School.
