= Francis Lamb =

American lawyer and politician

Francis Lamb (November 12, 1900 – July 26, 1975) was an American lawyer and politician.

Born in Freeport, Illinois, Lamb moved with his family to Madison, Wisconsin in 1905. He received his bachelor's degree in 1923 from University of Wisconsin and his law degree from University of Wisconsin Law School in 1925. Lamb practiced law in Madison, Wisconsin and served as counsel to Wisconsin Governor Walter Goodland. In 1933, Lamb served in the Wisconsin State Assembly and was a Republican. Lamb died suddenly in a hospital in Madison, Wisconsin.
