= William H. Mallory =

American politician

William H. Mallory was a storekeeper, farmer, and state legislator in Mississippi. He served in the Mississippi House of Representatives from 1872 to 1873 and from 1876 to 1877 first for Warren County, Mississippi and then for LeFlore County and Sunflower County. Before serving as a state representative he was a policeman and alderman. In 1872 he was elected president of Vicksburg Fire Company #2.

He was born in Virginia. The New National Era newspaper noted his heft.

He had a small general store in Vicksburg during the 1870s.

== See also ==
- African American officeholders from the end of the Civil War until before 1900
