= Winslow Lovejoy =

American football center

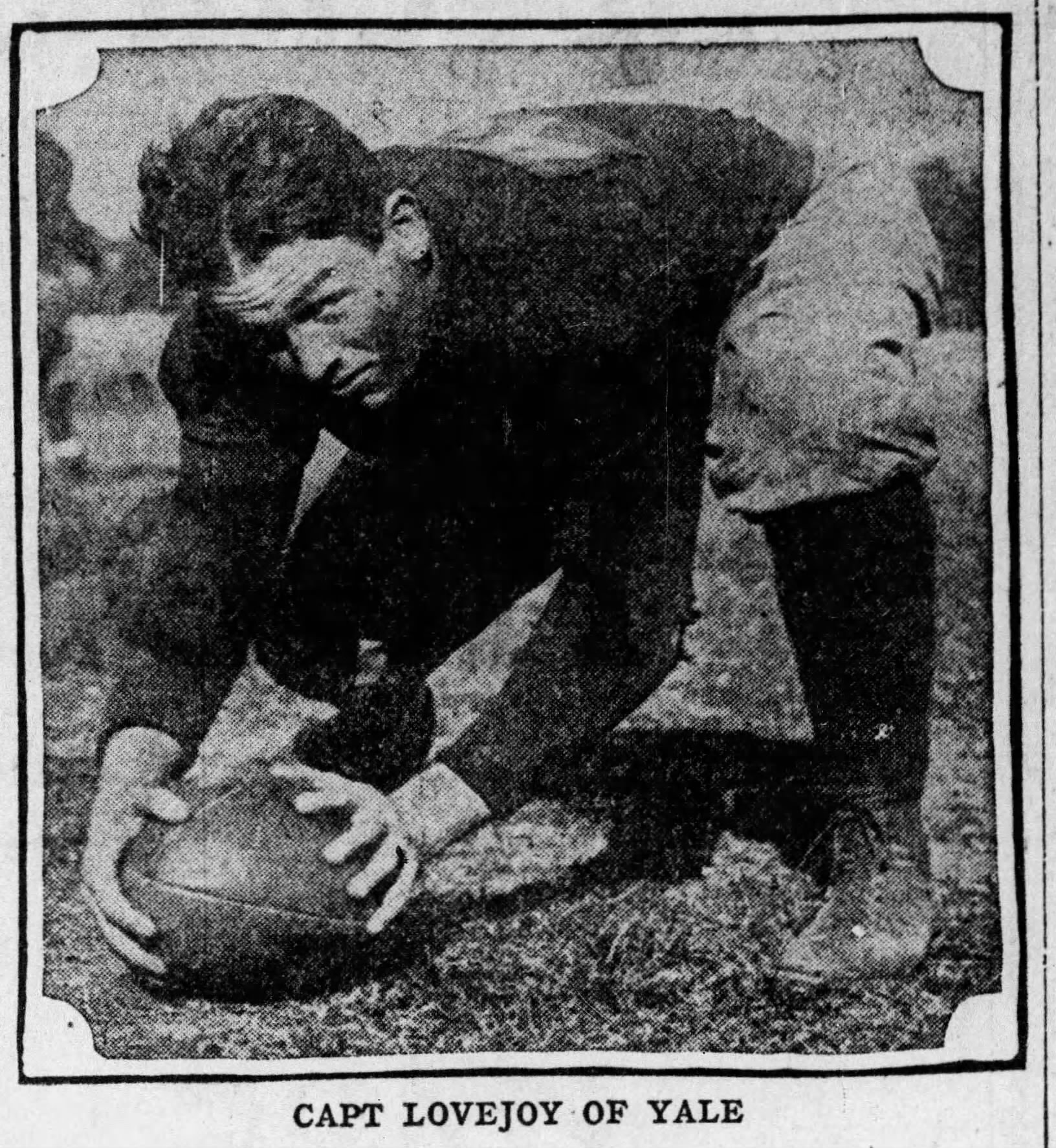

Profile
- Position: Center

Career information
- College: Yale (1922–1924)

Awards and highlights
- First-team All-American (1924); Second-team All-American (1923)

Winslow Lovejoy was an American college football player. He was a prominent center for the Yale Bulldogs, captain of the 1924 team.
