= Harry Wilson (halfback) =

American football, basketball, and lacrosse player (1902–1990)

- Wilson, circa 1926

Profile
- Position: Halfback

Personal information
- Born: August 6, 1902; Mingo Junction, Ohio, U.S.
- Died: October 26, 1990 (aged 88); Rochester, New York, U.S.

Career information
- College: Penn State (1921–1923); Army (1924–1927)

Awards and highlights
- Consensus All-American (1923); First-team All-American (1926)
- College Football Hall of Fame (Class of 1973)

Other information
- Resting place: St. Mary's Cemetery; Sharon, Pennsylvania, U.S.
- Spouse: Patricia
- Children: 3

Harry Edgar "Light Horse" Wilson (August 6, 1902 – October 26, 1990) was an American college football, college basketball, and college lacrosse player. He was elected to the College Football Hall of Fame in 1973. He was elected to the National Lacrosse Hall of Fame in 1963. While at West Point he earned a record 12 varsity letters in football, basketball, and lacrosse.

== Early life ==
Wilson was born August 6, 1902 in Mingo Junction, Ohio. He grew up in Sharpsville, Pennsylvania, and attended high school in Sharon, Pennsylvania.

== College sports playing career ==
Wilson played college sports at Penn State University (1921–23) and the United States Military Academy (1924–27). During his college sports career, Wilson measured 5 feet 9 inches (1.75 m) in height and weighed 170 pounds (77 kg).

Wilson received the nickname "Lighthorse Harry", derived from the nickname of Henry Lee III (an American Revolutionary War hero).

=== Penn State (1921–23) ===
Wilson played football (1921-1923), basketball and lacrosse at Pennsylvania State University. He was All-American at the U.S. Military Academy.

During Penn State's 1923 football season, Wilson had touchdown runs in its game against Navy of 95, 80, and 55 yards. During its game against the University of Pennsylvania of 49, 45, and 25 yards. That season, Walter Camp opined of his performance in football, "Wilson on his good days has no peer."

=== Army West Point (1924–27) ===
Wilson, circa 1926

Wilson, circa 1927

Wilson competed for Army West Point (the United States Military Academy) from 1924 through 1927. While at West Point he earned a record 12 varsity letters in football, basketball, and lacrosse.

During the 1926 and 1927 Army football seasons, Wilson paired with Red Cagle to form one of the greatest duo of halfbacks in college football history.

In the 1926 Army–Navy Game, Wilson had a strong performance at halfback. In the game, he gained more yards than any other player (121 yards) and also carried the ball more times than any other player. He narrowly missed a field goal attempt in the closing seconds of the game. Since the result was tied, had Wilson made the field goal Army would have outright beaten Navy. His performance in the game was praised by Navy's coach, Bill Ingram as "the greatest halfback performance" he had seen. Several writeups of the game considered Wilson to have put forward the most impressive performance of any player from either team. Stanford coach Pop Warner described him as the "individual star" of the game. The Associated Press described him the "ace" of Army team "who had shared the brunt of the attack" during the game. Notre Dame coach Knute Rockne described him as Army's "ace in the hole". The 1926 Army–Navy game has been considered among the greatest in Army–Navy Game history, and one of the greatest games in the entire history of college football. On the return train from the game (played in Chicago), Wilson was elected by his teammates to be the captain of Army football during the 1927 Army Cadets football team.

=== Honors ===
Wilson was inducted into the College Football Hall of Fame in 1973 Wilson was inducted as a member of the National Lacrosse Hall of Fame in 1963

Wilson was named "Consensus All–American" in 1923. He was named "First Team All–American" in 1926. He was named "Third Team All–American" in 1924 and 1925.

== Military career ==
After graduating from West Point, Wilson joined the Army Air Corps.

Wilson served in World War II as part of Air Force. He flew 45 missions during the war as a bomber pilot Wilson also trained bomber pilots in the skills necessary for masthead bombing (skip bombing).

Wilson retired as a colonel.

== Personal life ==
Wilson and his wife, Patricia, had three daughters: Patricia M., Mary, and Margaret. He died on October 26, 1990. He was buried at St. Mary's Cemetery in Sharon, Pennsylvania.
