= Bill Supplee =

American football player and professor (1903–1966)

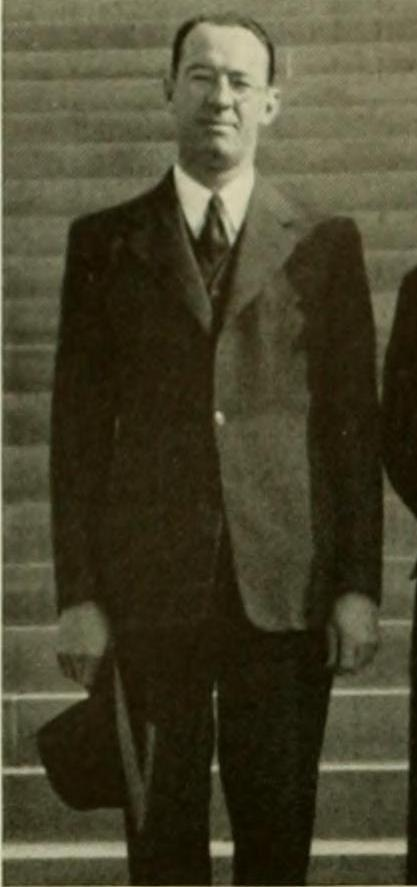
- Supplee of the Maryland athletic board in 1942

Profile
- Positions: End, back

Personal information
- Born: c. 1903; Washington, D.C.
- Died: July 1966; Laurel, Maryland

Career information
- College: Maryland (1923–1926)

Awards and highlights
- 1923 second-team All-American

William C. "Zuke" Supplee (December 21, 1903 – July 1966) was an American educator and college athlete. He attended the University of Maryland, where he played college football and basketball for the Maryland Terrapins and competed in track & field. In 1923, he received second-team All-America football honors, which made him the first Maryland player honored as such.

== Early life and college ==
Supplee was born in Washington, D.C. In 1922, he enrolled at the University of Maryland. During his initial year, he competed on the freshman track and football teams. Supplee earned varsity football letters each of the next three seasons. In 1923, Supplee was named a second-team All-American by the Associated Press, which made him the first Maryland football player to receive All-America honors. His performances during the team's win against Penn and its narrow loss to powerhouse Yale have been cited as the main reasons for his selection. He also received an All-America honorable mention from Walter Camp. In 1924, he was selected for the All-South Atlantic and the All-Maryland football teams, the latter of which was composed of the state's best players. Walter Camp again named Supplee an honorable mention All-American. In his final season in 1925, he served as the football team's captain.

Despite all of his athletic endeavors, Supplee excelled in his academic studies. One of his professors said of him, "To those who slander the American athlete as being a poor student and inferior intellect, I should like to point out Supplee as Maryland's refutation." Supplee graduated in 1926 with a Bachelor of Science degree in education.

== Later life ==
He later earned a doctorate and served on the university's faculty as a chemistry professor in the 1940s and 1950s. He also served on the university's athletic board.

Supplee and his wife, Grace, had two daughters. He drowned in 1966 at Rocky Gorge Reservoir in Laurel, Maryland, at the age of 63. His wife, Grace, died in 2000. In 1982, Supplee was posthumously inducted into the University of Maryland Athletic Hall of Fame.
