= Billy Young (American football) =

American football player (1901–1971)

Profile
- Position: Guard

Personal information
- Born: December 17, 1901; Kenton, Ohio
- Died: July 29, 1971 (aged 69); Kenton, Ohio

Career information
- College: Ohio State

Career history
- 1929: Green Bay Packers

Awards and highlights
- NFL champion (1929)

William George Young (December 17, 1901 – June 29, 1971) was a guard in the National Football League (NFL) who played for the Green Bay Packers. Young played his college football at the Ohio State University and played two professional games with the Green Bay Packers in 1929.
