= Ralph King (American football) =

American football player (1901–1978)

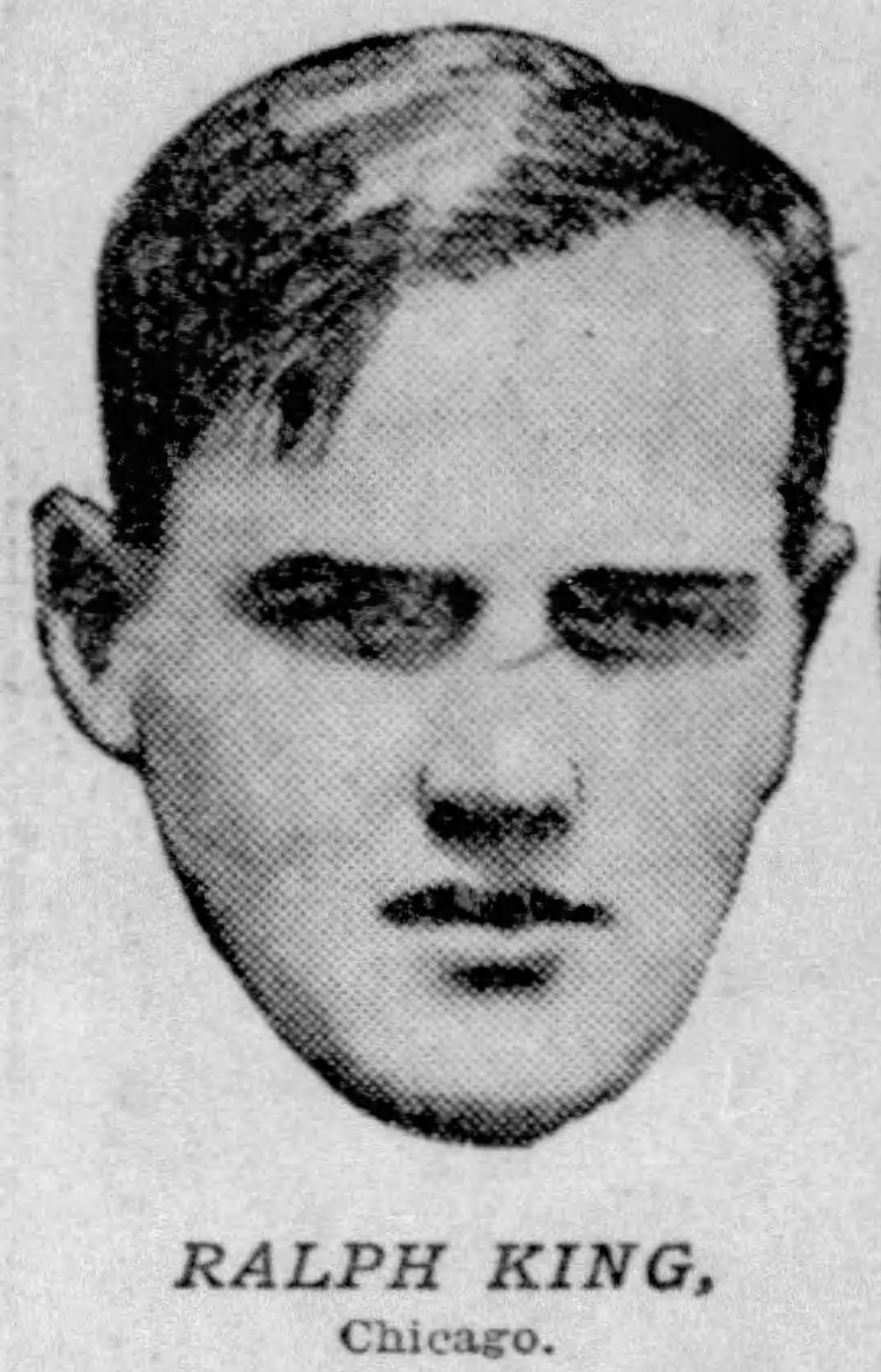
- King, 1922

Profile
- Positions: Center, guard

Personal information
- Born: November 2, 1901; Chicago, Illinois
- Died: February 8, 1978 (aged 76); Fairhope, Alabama
- Listed height: 6 ft 0 in (1.83 m)
- Listed weight: 250 lb (113 kg)

Career information
- High school: University of Chicago Laboratory (IL)
- College: Chicago

Career history
- Racine Legion (1924); Chicago Bears (1925)

Awards and highlights
- First-team All-Big Ten (1922); Third-team All-Pro (1924)

Ralph Warren King (November 2, 1901 – February 8, 1978) was an American football player. He played center at the University of Chicago from 1921 to 1923 and won first-team All-Big Ten honors in 1922. He also played professional football as a guard in the National Football League (NFL) for the Racine Legion (1924) and Chicago Bears (1925).

== Early life ==
King was born in 1901 in Chicago. He attended the University of Chicago Laboratory Schools.

== University of Chicago ==
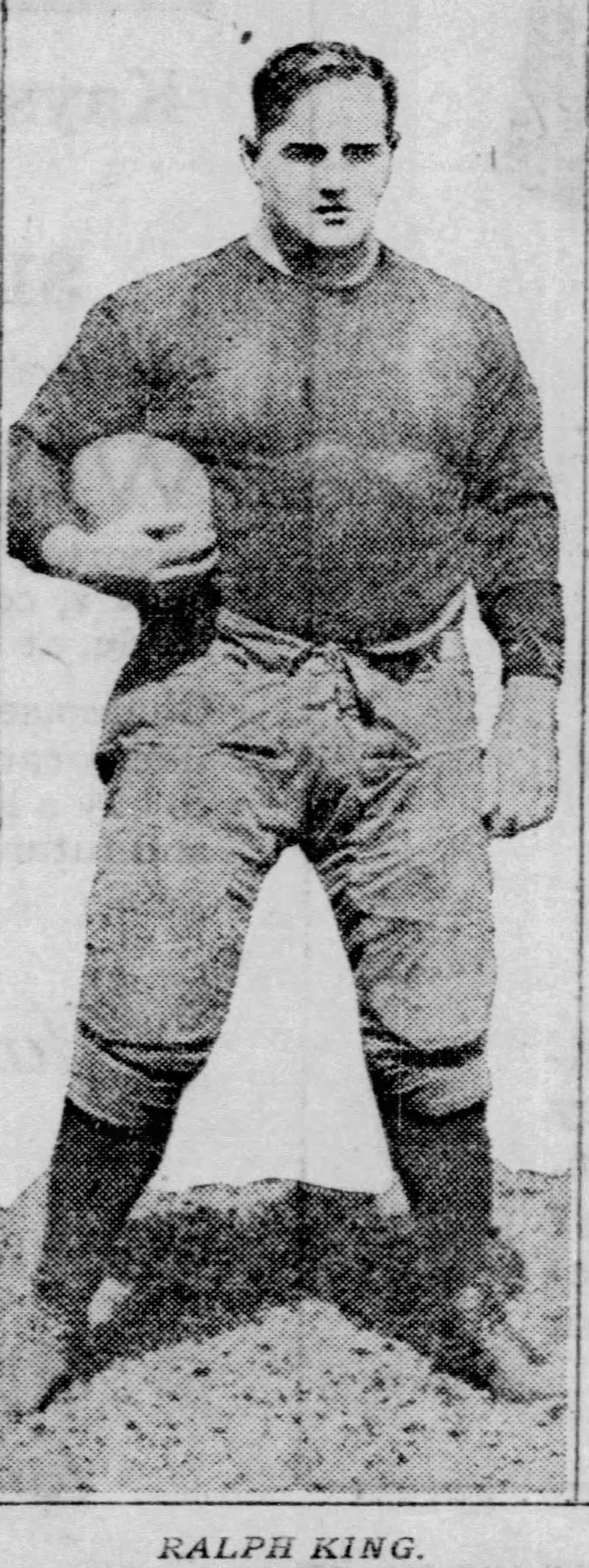
King, 1922

King played college football as a center for the University of Chicago Maroons from 1921 to 1923. As a junior, King helped lead the 1922 Chicago Maroons football team to a Big Ten Conference co-championship and received first-team honors from The Pantagraph and Walter Eckersall on the 1922 All-Big Ten Conference football team.

== Professional football ==
In September 1924, King signed to played professional football for the Racine Legion of the National Football League. He appeared in eight games as a starting guard for the 1924 Legion team.

In 1925, King played for the Chicago Bears. He appeared in two games for the Bears. He was selected as the third-team guard on the 1924 All-Pro Team.

== Later life ==
King died in 1978 at Fairhope, Alabama.
