= Frank Hanny =

American football player (1897–1946)

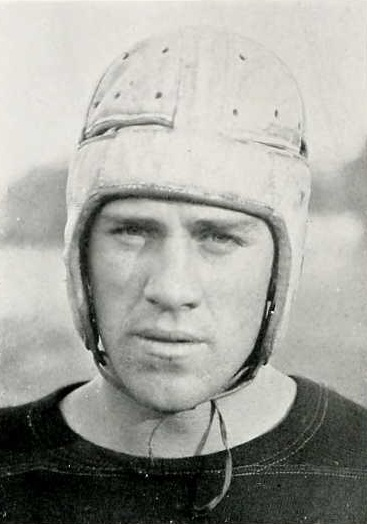

No. 19, 8, 63
- Position: End

Personal information
- Born: October 12, 1897; Aurora, Illinois, U.S.
- Died: September 3, 1946 (aged 48); Aurora, Illinois, U.S.

Career information
- College: Indiana

Career history
- 1923–1927: Chicago Bears
- 1928–1929: Providence Steam Roller
- 1930: Green Bay Packers
- 1930: Portsmouth Spartans

Awards and highlights
- 2× NFL champion (1928, 1930); 4× Second-team All-Pro (1923–1926)
- Stats at Pro Football Reference

Frank Matthew "Duke" Hanny (October 12, 1897 – September 3, 1946) was an American football end who played eight seasons in the National Football League (NFL). Hanny was the first player to be ejected in an NFL game in history, as he and Green Bay Packers player Tillie Voss exchanged punches in a game.

He died in Aurora, Illinois, on September 3, 1946, after a long illness. He was buried there at Mount Olivet Cemetery.

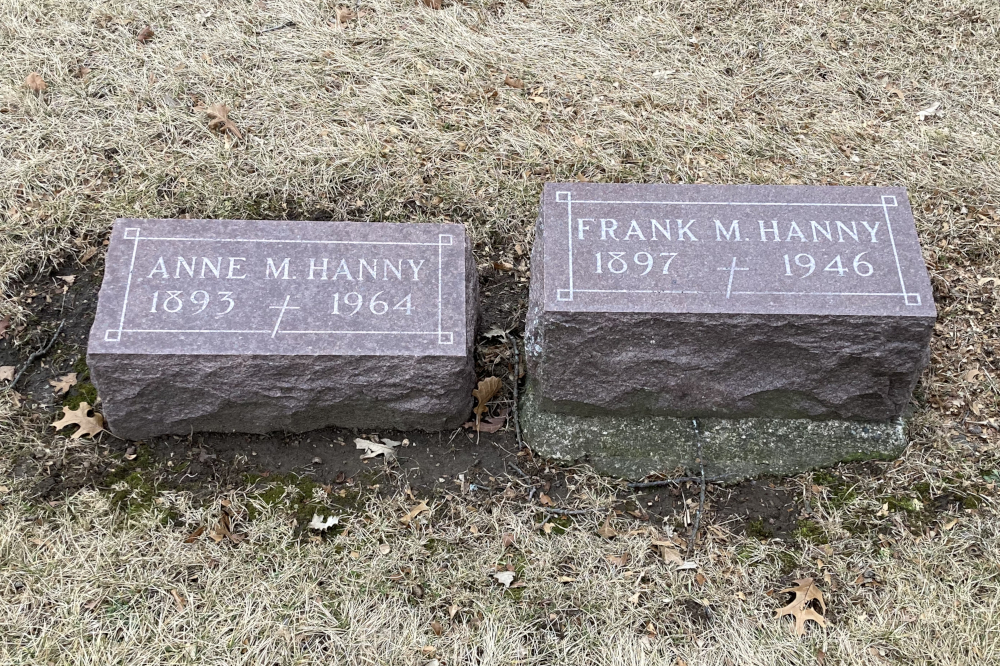
Hanny's grave at Mount Olivet Cemetery
