= Ray Eklund =

Biographical details
- Born: January 12, 1899
- Died: April 6, 1974 (aged 75); St. Cloud, Minnesota, U.S.

Playing career

Football
- 1922–1924: Minnesota
- Position: End

Coaching career (HC unless noted)

Basketball
- 1925–1926: Kentucky

Head coaching record
- Overall: 15–3

Accomplishments and honors

Awards
- Consensus All-American (1923); First-team All-Big Ten (1923); Third-team All-Big Ten (1922)

Ray Eklund was the head coach of the Kentucky Wildcats men's basketball team of the University of Kentucky in 1926. He compiled a 15–3 record. Eklund attended University of Minnesota.
