= Red Dunn =

American football player (1901–1957)

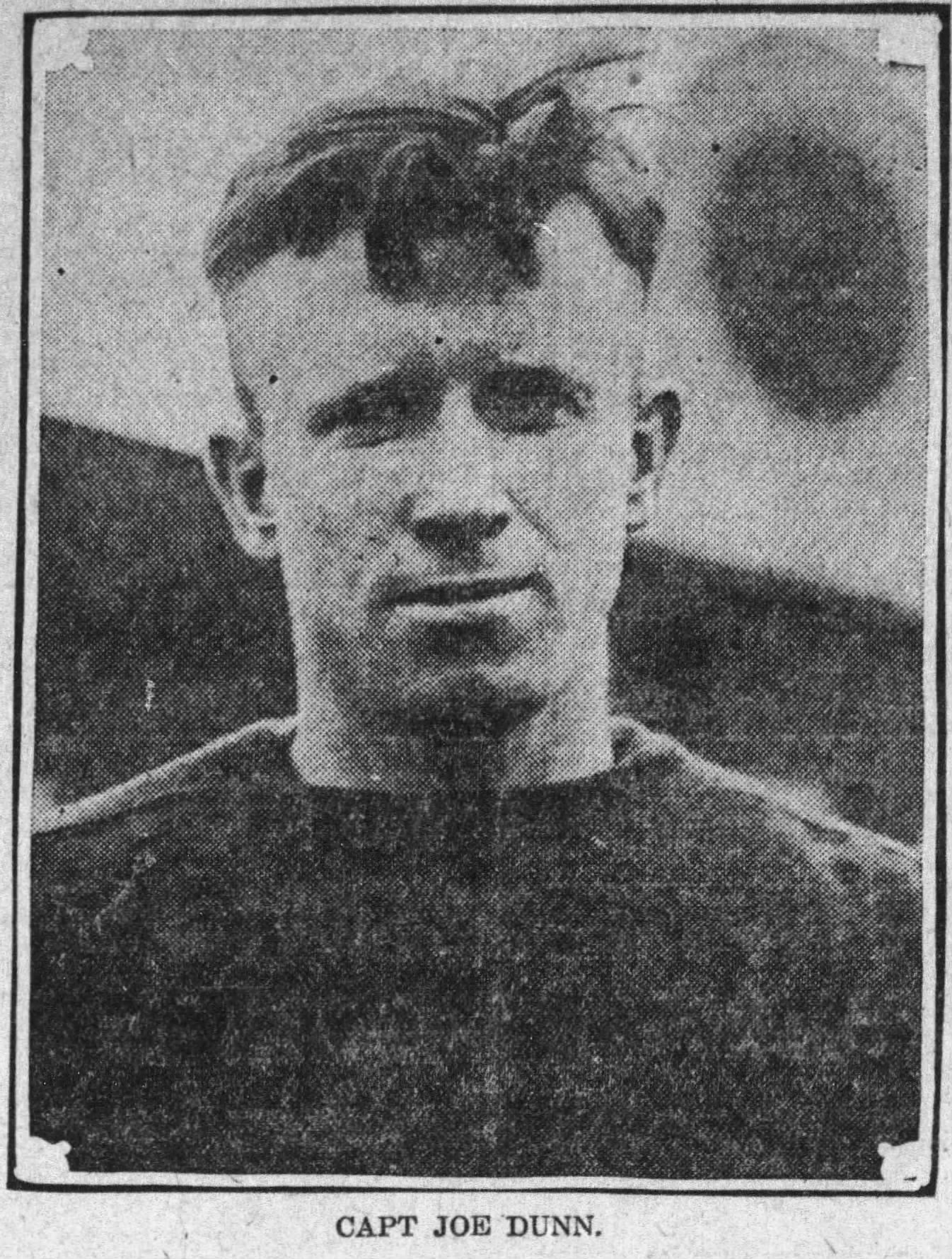
- Dunn as Marquette's captain in 1923

No. 2, 11, 16, 7, 15
- Position: Running back

Personal information
- Born: June 21, 1901; Milwaukee, Wisconsin, U.S.
- Died: January 15, 1957 (aged 55); Milwaukee, Wisconsin, U.S.
- Listed height: 5 ft 11 in (1.80 m)
- Listed weight: 177 lb (80 kg)

Career information
- College: Marquette

Career history

Playing
- 1924: Milwaukee Badgers
- 1925–1926: Chicago Cardinals
- 1927–1931: Green Bay Packers

Coaching
- 1932–1940: Marquette (assistant)

Awards and highlights
- 4× NFL champion (1925, 1929, 1930, 1931); Second-team All-Pro (1931); Green Bay Packers Hall of Fame; Third-team All-American (1923)
- Stats at Pro Football Reference

Joseph Aloysius "Red" Dunn (June 21, 1901 – January 15, 1957) was an American professional football player who was a running back and punter for eight seasons with the Milwaukee Badgers, Chicago Cardinals, and Green Bay Packers. He was inducted into the Green Bay Packers Hall of Fame in 1976. He is the grandfather of former quarterback Jason Gesser.

Nicknamed "Red" for the color of his hair, Dunn possessed an equally colorful personality. He earned five letters competing in football, basketball and baseball at Marquette Academy. Dunn later attended Marquette University, earning All-America honors while leading the Golden Avalanche in 1922 and 1923 to a 17–0–1 record. While a Packer, he served as Curly Lambeau's "field general" for the 1929, 1930, and 1931 NFL Champions.

After his playing days Dunn moved to coaching, assisting Frank Murray and Paddy Driscoll at Marquette from 1932 to 1940. Dunn is a member of the Green Bay Packers Hall of Fame and the Wisconsin Athletic Hall of Fame.
