= Adolph Bieberstein =

American football player and attorney

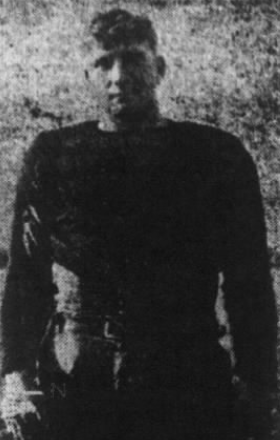
- Bieberstein in 1926

No. 18
- Position: Guard

Personal information
- Born: December 17, 1902; Phillips, Wisconsin, U.S.
- Died: December 31, 1981 (aged 79); Madison, Wisconsin, U.S.

Career information
- High school: Phillips (WI)
- College: Wisconsin (1921–1924)

Career history

Playing
- Racine Tornadoes (1926); Green Bay Packers (1926)

Coaching
- Wisconsin (1925) Line coach; Wisconsin (1928) Freshman line coach; Wisconsin (1931) Assistant coach

Career statistics
- Games played: 6
- Games started: 6
- Stats at Pro Football Reference

Adolph Joseph Bieberstein (December 17, 1902 – December 31, 1981) was an American professional football player and attorney. From Phillips, Wisconsin, he played college football as a guard for the Wisconsin Badgers and was an All-Big Ten Conference selection. After briefly serving as a coach, he joined the Racine Tornadoes of the National Football League (NFL) in 1926. He played that year for the Tornadoes and, after they disbanded, in one game for the Green Bay Packers. Following his football career, Bieberstein became an attorney. He was a candidate for several political offices and held positions in state government agencies. He was also a special counsel in a border dispute between Wisconsin and Michigan and argued before the Supreme Court of the United States for that case.

== Early life and college career ==
Adolph Joseph Bieberstein was born December 17, 1902, in Phillips, Wisconsin. He was descended from a German family of pioneers. He attended Phillips High School and was the school's only alumnus to play in the National Football League (NFL). After high school, Bieberstein attended the University of Wisconsin–Madison from 1921 to 1924 and played football for the Wisconsin Badgers. Before making the varsity team, he played in the school's freshman and sophomore football game and returned a blocked punt for a touchdown. By his sophomore year, he was noted in The Capital Times to be a "lineman of exceptional ability although handicapped by lack of weight".

Bieberstein debuted for the varsity in 1923 and was described as a "tower of strength" in his two years for the Badgers. He was selected first-team All-Big Ten Conference as a guard nearly unanimously for the 1923 season. As a senior, he was considered Wisconsin's "iron man", with the Times describing him going "through game after game without an injury or without being removed". He repeated as a first-team All-Big Ten selection in his senior year. As Bieberstein was set to graduate following the 1924 season, one Madison sportswriter stated that "his absence will leave a big hole ... Players in the forward wall are often overlooked in picking star performers on the team, but Bierberstein's work has been of such caliber that he was recognized all over the conference as one of the best guards in the history of the Big Ten". In addition to playing football at Wisconsin, he also competed in track and field and wrestling. After he graduated, he served as the football team's line coach during the 1925 season while also studying law.

== Professional career ==
In September 1926, Bieberstein signed to play professional football for the Racine Tornadoes of the NFL. He was the largest player on the team, weighing 210 pounds (95 kg), and considered their top lineman; the Green Bay Press-Gazette reported that he was regarded "as at least the equal of any lineman who ever wore a Racine uniform". He started all five games for the Tornadoes as they compiled a record of 1–4 before folding. Following the disbandment of the Tornadoes, he signed with the Green Bay Packers in November 1926; when the Tornadoes had played the Packers, Bieberstein was described in the Press-Gazette as the only Tornado lineman to play well. He only played one game for the Packers, starting at left guard in their 20–14 loss to the Frankford Yellow Jackets.

== Legal career and later life ==
After the football season, Bieberstein graduated from the University of Wisconsin Law School and was then admitted to the bar in February 1927. Later that year, he joined the law firm Bull and Biart, which was then renamed to Bull, Biart and Bieberstein. In 1928, he ran for election to be the district attorney for Dane County as a member of the Democratic Party, though he was defeated by Fred Risser.

Bieberstein returned to Wisconsin as freshman line coach in 1928 and also served as an assistant football coach in 1931. In 1932, he was an unsuccessful candidate for the Wisconsin State Assembly, defeated by Francis Lamb with 8,693 votes, compared to Lamb's 13,118. The following year, he was appointed by the Wisconsin governor to the state bureau of personnel, before being named examiner for the public service commission in 1934.

Towards the end of 1934, Bieberstein was appointed special counsel and was involved in a dispute between Michigan and Wisconsin regarding the states' border. According to the Kenosha News, "the two states had disputed the location of the boundary line from the Menominee river to the center of the bay. Wisconsin sought a triangular area between the river mouth and Chambers Island, while Michigan contended the boundary line should run directly east to the center of the bay". Bieberstein argued his state's case before the Supreme Court of the United States in Wisconsin v. Michigan. Eventually, Wisconsin conceded "area in the vicinity of the river". He remained with his law firm for 22 years before leaving to form Stephens, Cannon, Bieberstein, and Cooper, in 1948. He later was a member of Bieberstein, Cooper, Bruemmer, Hanson and Tinglum.

Bieberstein was a member of the Fraternal Order of Eagles and served as the organization's Madison president. He served on the Belleville State Bank board of directors, was president of the Madison Club, and served as president of the Dane County Bar Association. Bieberstein was married to Amine Bieberstein, having two children with her before their divorce in 1936. He remarried to Merle Klug in 1937. He died on December 31, 1981, in Madison, at the age of 79.
