= Jim McMillen =

American football player (1902–1984)

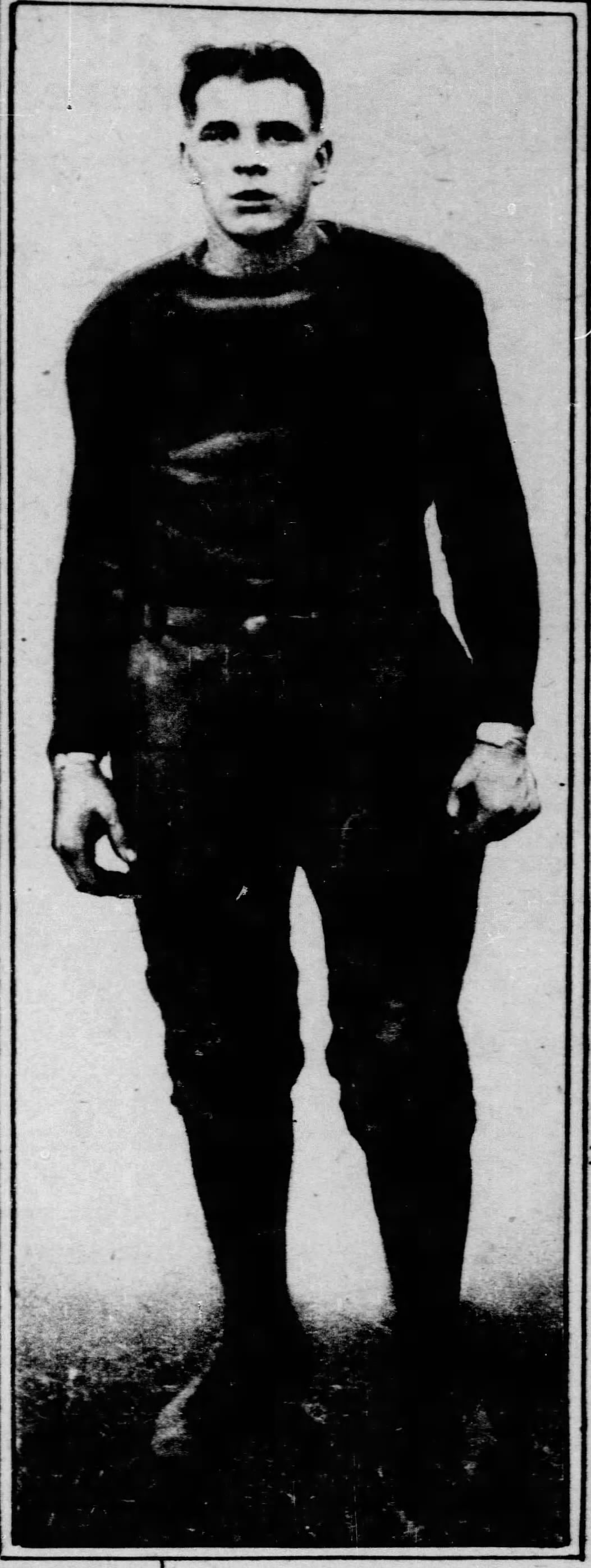
- McMillen, the Fighting Illini football team captain of 1923.

No. 22
- Position: Offensive guard

Personal information
- Born: October 23, 1902; Grayslake, Illinois, U.S.
- Died: January 27, 1984 (aged 81); Lake Forest, Illinois, U.S.
- Listed height: 6 ft 1 in (1.85 m)
- Listed weight: 215 lb (98 kg)

Career information
- High school: Libertyville (Libertyville, Illinois)
- College: Illinois

Career history
- Chicago Bears (1924–1928)

Awards and highlights
- 2× First-team All-Pro (1925, 1928); Second-team All-Pro (1924); National champion (1923); Consensus All-American (1923); 2× First-team All-Big Ten (1922, 1923)
- Stats at Pro Football Reference

James Willard McMillen (October 23, 1902 – January 27, 1984) was an American professional football player who was a guard for five seasons with the Chicago Bears of the National Football League (NFL). He was born in Grayslake, Illinois. He attended the University of Illinois where he played football, wrestled, and was a member of Sigma Pi fraternity. He was a consensus All-American in 1923, All-Big Ten in 1922 and 1923, as well as team captain. As a member of Illinois' wrestling team, he only lost one match in three years.

While playing for the Bears, McMillen continued to wrestle on the side. He even left the Bears for a while because of how much money he was making as a wrestler. In 1932 he was given the chance to buy an ownership interest in the Bears. This purchase eventually allowed him to become one of the team's vice presidents. During World War II, he was a Lt. Commander in the United States Navy and assigned to Navy Pier in Chicago. In 1949 and 1953 he was elected mayor of Antioch, Illinois.
