= Bill Mallory (American football, born 1901) =

American football player (1901–1945)

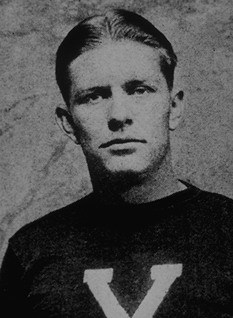

No. 12
- Position: Fullback

Personal information
- Born: November 20, 1901; Memphis, Tennessee, U.S.
- Died: February 19, 1945 (aged 43); Italy
- Listed height: 5 ft 10 in (1.78 m)
- Listed weight: 175 lb (79 kg)

Career information
- College: Yale (1921-1923)

Awards and highlights
- Consensus All-American (1923)

William Neely "Memphis" Mallory (November 20, 1901 – February 13, 1945) was an American college football player. He was a significant part of the Yale University teams that went 8–1 in 1921 and 8–0 in 1923. After graduating, he joined the US Army Air Forces as an intelligence officer and led Operation Mallory during World War II, which destroyed 22 of 24 bridges over the Po River, thereby damaging German supply lines into Italy. He died on his way home from the war, when his plane crashed. He was elected to the College Football Hall of Fame in 1964.

Yale University established the William Neely Mallory Award in his memory.
