= Dolph Eckstein =

American football player (1902–1963)

Profile
- Position: Center

Personal information
- Born: May 7, 1902
- Died: June 28, 1963 (aged 61)

Career information
- College: Brown

Career history
- Providence Steam Roller (1925–1926)
- Stats at Pro Football Reference

Adolph William Eckstein (May 7, 1902 – June 28, 1963) was an American football player. He is considered the greatest center ever to play for Brown University. He played for two seasons in the National Football League (NFL) with the Providence Steam Roller.
