= Ralph Claypool =

American football player (1898–1969)

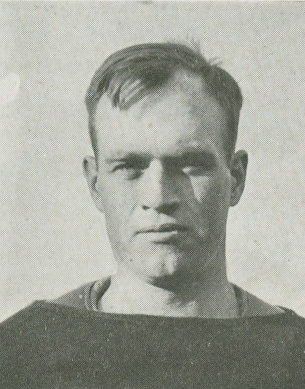
- Claypool from 1922 Purdue yearbook

Profile
- Position: Center

Personal information
- Born: December 15, 1898; Blue Grass, Iowa, U.S.
- Died: November 17, 1969 (aged 70); Webster Groves, Missouri, U.S.

Career information
- College: Purdue

Career history
- Chicago Cardinals (1925–1928)

Awards and highlights
- First-team All-Pro (1925); First-team All-Big Ten (1924)

Career statistics
- Games played: 30
- Games started: 28

Ralph LeClair Claypool (December 15, 1898 – November 17, 1969) was an American football center who played professionally for four seasons, from 1925 to 1928, with the Chicago Cardinals of the National Football League (NFL).

Claypool was born in Blue Grass, Iowa, the son of Addison Knox Claypool and Mona May Bowser Claypool. He graduated from Davenport High School in Iowa, and played college football at Purdue University.

He played professional football as a member of the Chicago Cardinals for four seasons, from 1925 to 1928. After his sports career, he ran a water pump and machinery company in Missouri.

Claypool married Mary Bryant Haas in 1928, and had three sons. He died in 1969, at the age of 70, in Webster Groves, Missouri.
