= 1920 Big Ten Conference football season =

- Sport: American football
- Teams: 10
- Champion: Ohio State
- Runners-up: Wisconsin

Football seasons
- 1919 1921

1920 Big Ten Conference football standings
	Conf.					Overall
Team	W		L		T	W		L		T
Ohio State $	5	–	0	–	0	7	–	1	–	0
Wisconsin	4	–	1	–	0	6	–	1	–	0
Indiana	3	–	1	–	0	5	–	2	–	0
Illinois	4	–	2	–	0	5	–	2	–	0
Iowa	3	–	2	–	0	5	–	2	–	0
Michigan	2	–	2	–	0	5	–	2	–	0
Northwestern	2	–	3	–	0	3	–	4	–	0
Chicago	2	–	4	–	0	3	–	4	–	0
Purdue	0	–	4	–	0	2	–	5	–	0
Minnesota	0	–	6	–	0	1	–	6	–	0
$ – Conference champion

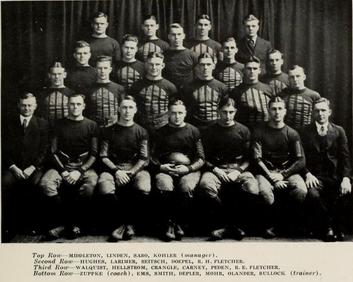
1920 Fighting Illini Football Team

The 1920 Big Ten Conference football season was the 25th season of college football played by the member schools of the Big Ten Conference (also known as the Western Conference) and was a part of the 1920 college football season.

The 1920 Ohio State Buckeyes football team, under head coach John Wilce, compiled a 7–0 record in the regular season, won the Big Ten championship, and lost to California in the 1921 Rose Bowl. Halfback Gaylord Stinchcomb and guard Iolas Huffman were consensus first-team All-Americans.

The 1920 Wisconsin Badgers football team, under head coach John R. Richards, compiled a 6–1 record and finished in second place in the Big Ten. Tackle Ralph Scott was a consensus first-team All-American. End Frank Weston and center George Bunge also received first-team All-American honors from at least one selector.

End Chuck Carney of Illinois was the Big Ten's fourth consensus first-team All-American. Iowa led the conference in scoring offense (20.3 points per game), and Michigan led the conference in scoring defense (3.0 points allowed per game).

== Season overview ==
=== Results and team statistics ===
Conf. Rank	Team	Head coach	Overall record	Conf. record	PPG	PAG
1	Ohio State	John Wilce	7–1	5–0	18.8	6.0
2	Wisconsin	John R. Richards	6–1	4–1	20.1	4.1
3	Indiana	Ewald O. Stiehm	5–2	3–1	18.4	6.9
4	Illinois	Robert Zuppke	5–2	4–2	13.9	5.3
5	Iowa	Howard Jones	5–2	3–2	**20.3**	7.7
6	Michigan	Fielding H. Yost	5–2	2–2	17.3	**3.0**
7	Northwestern	Elmer McDevitt	3–4	2–3	9.4	12.9
8	Chicago	Amos Alonzo Stagg	3–4	2–4	11.0	3.9
9	Purdue	A. G. Scanlon	2–5	0–4	5.1	14.7
10	Minnesota	Henry L. Williams	1–6	0–6	8.9	13.1

Key
PPG = Average of points scored per game; team with highest average in bold
PAG = Average of points allowed per game; team with lowest average in bold

=== Regular season ===
==== September 25 ====
On September 25, 1920, only one Big Ten team saw action.

- Indiana 47, Franklin 0

==== October 2 ====
On October 2, 1920, the Big Ten football teams participated in one conference game and five non-conference games. The non-conference games all resulted in victories, giving the Big Ten a 6–0 non-conference record to that point in the season. Chicago, Illinois, and Michigan had bye weeks.

- Iowa 14, Indiana 7
- Ohio State 55, Ohio Wesleyan 0
- Wisconsin 60, Lawrence 0
- Northwestern 14, Knox 0
- Purdue 10, DePauw 0
- Minnesota 41, North Dakota 3

==== October 9 ====
On October 9, 1920, the Big Ten teams participated in two conference games and six non-conference games. The non-conference games resulted in six victories, giving the Big Ten a 12–0 non-conference record to that point in the season.

- Northwestern 17, Minnesota 0
- Chicago 20, Purdue 0
- Ohio State 37, Oberlin 0
- Wisconsin 27, Michigan Agricultural 0
- Indiana 24, Mississippi State 0
- Illinois 41, Drake 0
- Iowa 63, Cornell 0
- Michigan 35, Case 0

==== October 16 ====
On October 16, 1920, the Big Ten teams participated in four conference games and two non-conference games. The non-conference games resulted in two victories, giving the Big Ten a 14–0 non-conference record to that point in the season.

- Ohio State 17, Purdue 0
- Wisconsin 27, Northwestern 7
- Minnesota 21, Indiana 7
- Illinois 20, Iowa 3
- Michigan 35, Michigan Agricultural 0
- Chicago 41, Wabash 0

==== October 23 ====
On October 23, 1920, the Big Ten teams participated in four conference games. Northwestern and Purdue had bye weeks.

- Ohio State 13, Wisconsin 7
- Illinois 7, Michigan 6
- Indiana 21, Minnesota 7
- Chicago 10, Iowa 0

==== October 30 ====
On October 30, 1920, the Big Ten teams participated in three conference games and two non-conference games. The non-conference games resulted in two victories, giving the Big Ten a 16–0 non-conference record to that point in the season. Iowa and Wisconsin had bye weeks.

- Ohio State 7, Chicago 6
- Indiana 10, Northwestern 7
- Illinois 17, Minnesota 7
- Michigan 21, Tulane 0
- Purdue 19, Wabash 14

==== November 6 ====
On November 6, 1920, the Big Ten teams participated in four conference games and one non-conference game. The non-conference game resulted in a loss to Notre Dame, giving the Big Ten a 16–1 non-conference record to that point in the season. Indiana had a bye week.

- Ohio State 14, Michigan 7
- Wisconsin 3, Minnesota 0
- Illinois 3, Chicago 0
- Iowa 20, Northwestern 0
- Notre Dame 28, Purdue 0

==== November 13 ====
On November 13, 1920, the Big Ten teams participated in four conference games and one non-conference game. The non-conference game resulted in a second loss to Notre Dame, giving the Big Ten a 16–2 non-conference record to that point in the season. Ohio State had a bye week.

- Wisconsin 14, Illinois 9
- Michigan 14, Chicago 0
- Iowa 28, Minnesota 7
- Northwestern 14, Purdue 0
- Notre Dame 13, Indiana 10

==== November 20 ====
On November 20, 1920, the Big Ten teams participated in four conference games and two non-conference games. The non-conference games resulted in a win and a loss, giving the Big Ten a 17–3 non-conference record for the regular season. All three losses were against Notre Dame.

- Ohio State 7, Illinois 0
- Wisconsin 3, Chicago 0
- Indiana 10, Purdue 7
- Michigan 3, Minnesota 0
- Iowa 14, Iowa State 10
- Notre Dame 33, Northwestern 7

=== Bowl games ===
On January 1, 1921, at Tournament Park in Pasadena, California, Ohio State lost to national champion California by a 28–0 score. California remained undefeated from 1920 until 1924.

== Awards and honors ==
=== All-Big Ten players ===
The following players were selected as first-team players on the 1920 All-Big Ten Conference football team by E. C. Patterson for Collier's Weekly (ECP), Malcolm McLean, or Walter Eckersall of the Chicago Tribune (WE). It also includes players listed as members of the 1920 "All-Conference Team" as published in the "ESPN Big Ten Football Encyclopedia" (BTFE).

Position	Name	Team	Selectors
Quarterback	Aubrey Devine	Iowa	BTFE, ECP, MM, WE
Halfback	Gaylord Stinchcomb	Ohio State	BTFE, MM, WE
Halfback	Frank Steketee	Michigan	BTFE, WE
Halfback	Alvah Elliott	Wisconsin	ECP, MM
Halfback	Ralph E. Fletcher	Illinois	ECP
Fullback	Jack Crangle	Illinois	BTFE, ECP, MM, WE
End	Chuck Carney	Illinois	BTFE, ECP, MM, WE
End	Frank Weston	Wisconsin	BTFE, ECP, WE
End	Lester Belding	Iowa	MM
Tackle	Ralph Scott	Wisconsin	ECP, MM
Tackle	Iolas Huffman	Ohio State	ECP
Tackle	Angus Goetz	Michigan	MM
Tackle	Duke Slater	Iowa	BTFE, WE
Guard	Elliot C. Risley	Indiana	MM
Guard	Charles McGuire	Chicago	BTFE [tackle], MM, WE [tackle]
Guard	Festus Tierney	Minnesota	BTFE, WE
Guard	George C. Bunge	Wisconsin	ECP
Guard	Dean W. Trott	Ohio State	ECP
Guard	Graham Penfield	Northwestern	BTFE, WE
Center	Jack Depler	Illinois	BTFE, ECP, MM, WE
Center	Ernie Vick	Michigan	BTFE

=== All-Americans ===
Four Big Ten players were selected as consensus first-team players on the 1920 College Football All-America Team. They were:

Position	Name	Team	Selectors
Halfback	Gaylord Stinchcomb	Ohio State	FM, WC, LP, WE
End	Chuck Carney	Illinois	WC, LP, NEA UP, WE
Tackle	Ralph Scott	Wisconsin	WC
Guard	Iolas Huffman	Ohio State	FM, LP

Other Big Ten players received first-team honors from at least one selector. They were:

Position	Name	Team	Selectors
End	Frank Weston	Wisconsin	FM
Center	Jack Depler	Illinois	NEA
Center	George Bunge	Wisconsin	LP
