= 1920 All-Western college football team =

American all-star college football team

The 1920 All-Western college football team consists of American football players selected to the All-Western teams chosen by various selectors for the 1920 college football season.

== All-Western selections ==
=== Ends ===
- Chuck Carney, Illinois (MK, MM, RG, CT) (CFHOF)
- Frank Weston, Wisconsin (FM, MK, RG, CT-1)
- Lester Belding, Iowa (FM, MM, CT-2)
- Franklin Cappon, Michigan (CT-2)

=== Tackles ===
- Frank Coughlin, Notre Dame (MK, MM, CT-1)
- Iolas Huffman, Ohio State (FM [guard])
- Tad Wieman, Michigan (FM)
- Angus Goetz, Michigan (MM)
- Duke Slater, Iowa (RG, CT-2) (CFHOF)
- Tillie Voss, Detroit (RG, CT-1)

=== Guards ===
- Charles McGuire, Chicago (FM [tackle], MK [end], MM, CT-2 [tackle])
- William G. McCaw, Indiana (FM, MK)
- Graham Penfield, Northwestern (RG, CT-1)
- George C. Bunge, Wisconsin (RG)
- Maurice J. "Clipper" Smith, Notre Dame (MK, CT-2)
- Tierney, Minnesota (CT-1)
- Smith, Notre Dame (CT-2)

=== Centers ===
- Jack Depler, Illinois (FM, MK, MM [guard], RG, CT-2)
- Polly Wallace, Ames (MM, CT-1)

=== Quarterbacks ===
- Aubrey Devine, Iowa (MK, MM, RG, CT-1) (CFHOF)
- Robert H. Fletcher, Illinois (FM, CT-2)

=== Halfbacks ===
- Gaylord Stinchcomb, Ohio State (FM, MK, MM, CT-1) (CFHOF)
- George Gipp, Notre Dame (FM [fullback], MK, MM, RG, CT-1) (CFHOF)
- Arnold Oss, Minnesota (FM)
- Elliott, Wisconsin (CT-2)
- Steketee, Michigan (CT-2)

=== Fullbacks ===
- Jack Crangle, Illinois (MK, RG, CT-1)
- Phil White, Oklahoma (MM, RG [halfback])
- Sundt, Wisconsin (CT-2)

== Key ==
FM = Frank G. Menke, sporting editor of King Features Syndicate

MK = Mark Kelly in Chicago Herald-Examiner

MM = Malcolm McLean in Chicago Evening Post

RG = Ralston Goss in Detroit Free Press

CT = selected by the Chicago Tribune.

CFHOF = College Football Hall of Fame

== See also ==
- 1920 College Football All-America Team
- 1920 All-Big Ten Conference football team
