= 1920 All-Big Ten Conference football team =

American college football all-star team

The 1920 All-Big Ten Conference football team consists of American football players selected to the All-Big Ten Conference teams chosen by various selectors for the 1920 Big Ten Conference football season.

== All Big-Ten selections ==
=== Ends ===
- Chuck Carney, Illinois (CSM, DL, EA, ECP-1, EOS, HB, HJ, HMD, JW, MM, PD, RA, TL, WE-1)
- Frank Weston, Wisconsin (DL, EA, ECP-1, EOS, FH, FM, HB, JW, PD, RA, TL, WE-1)
- Lester Belding, Iowa (CSM, ECP-2, FM, HJ, MM)
- Frank Hanny, Indiana (FH)
- Gus Eckberg, Minnesota (HMD)

=== Tackles ===
- Iolas Huffman, Ohio State (CSM, DL, EA, ECP-1, FH, FM [guard], HJ, JW, PD, RA, TL)
- Angus Goetz, Michigan (DL, EA [guard], HB, JW, MM, PD, RA, TL)
- Duke Slater, Iowa (EA, ECP-2, EOS, HB, HJ, HMD, WE-1)
- Ralph Scott, Wisconsin (ECP-1, FH, MM)
- Elliot C. Risley, Indiana (EOS, MM [guard])
- Tad Wieman, Michigan (FM)
- Jackson, Chicago (CSM)

=== Guards ===
- Tarzan Taylor, Ohio State (DL, EA, ECP-2, FH, HB, HMD [tackle], JW, PD, RA, TL)
- Robert J. Dunne, Michigan (CSM, EOS, FH, HMD, PD)
- Charles McGuire, Chicago (CSM, ECP-2 [tackle], FM [tackle], HJ, MM, WE-1 [tackle])
- Festus Tierney, Minnesota (HB, RA, WE-1)
- Bill McCaw, Indiana (EOS, FM)
- George C. Bunge, Wisconsin (DL, ECP-1)
- Dean W. Trott, Ohio State (ECP-1)
- Albert W. T. Mohr, Jr., Illinois (HJ)
- James Brader, Wisconsin (ECP-2)
- Harry Margoles, Wisconsin (HMD)
- Graham Penfield, Northwestern (TL, WE-1)

=== Centers ===
- Jack Depler, Illinois (CSM, DL, EA, ECP-1, EOS, FH, FM, HB, HJ, HMD, JW [guard], MM, RA, WE-1)
- Andy Nemecek, Ohio State (ECP-2, JW, TL)
- Ernie Vick, Michigan (PD)

=== Quarterbacks ===
- Aubrey Devine, Iowa (CSM [halfback], DL, EA, ECP-1, EOS [halfback], FH, HB, HJ, HMD, MM, PD, RA, WE-1)
- Hoge Workman, Ohio State (CSM, ECP-2, JW, TL)
- Robert H. Fletcher, Illinois (FM)
- Charlie Mathys, Indiana (EOS)

=== Halfbacks ===
- Gaylord Stinchcomb, Ohio State (CSM, DL, EA, ECP-2 [end], EOS, FH, FM, HB, HJ, HMD, JW, MM, PD, RA, TL, WE-1)
- Frank Steketee, Michigan (DL, HB, PD, RA, WE-1)
- Al Elliott, Wisconsin (ECP-1, JW, MM, TL)
- Arnold Oss, Minnesota (EA, FM, HMD)
- Ralph E. Fletcher, Illinois (ECP-1)
- Laurie Walquist, Illinois (ECP-2, FH)
- Glenn Devine, Iowa (ECP-2)

=== Fullbacks ===
- Jack Crangle, Illinois (CSM, DL, EA, ECP-1, FH, HB, HJ, HMD, JW, MM, PD, RA, TL, WE-1)
- Russell S. Williams, Indiana (EOS, HJ [halfback])
- George Gipp, Notre Dame (FM)
- Guy Sundt, Wisconsin (ECP-2)

== Key ==
Bold = consensus choice by a majority of the selectors

Italics = Player whose team was not a member of the Big Ten (certain selectors chose All-Western teams in the geographic sense; others chose All-Western teams in reference to the Western Conference, a.k.a. the Big Ten Conference)

CSM = Charles A. Bush in Christian Science Monitor

DL = Deake Leake in Akron Press

EA = Earl C. Arnold, sports editor of Minneapolis Tribune

ECP = E. C. Patterson for Collier's Weekly

EOS = E.O. Stiehm, head coach of Indiana University

FH = Fred Hayner in Chicago Daily News

FM = Frank G. Menke, sporting editor of King Features Syndicate

HB = Harry Bullion in the Detroit Free Press

HJ = Howard Jones, head coach at University of Iowa

HMD = Herbert M. Dustin in Minneapolis Daily News

JW = John Wilce, head coach at Ohio State

MM = Malcolm McLean in the Chicago Evening Post

PD = Prentiss Douglass, assistant coach at University of Michigan

RA = Robert C. Angell, sports editor of The Michigan Daily

TL = The Lantern, Ohio Student University

WE = Walter Eckersall

== See also ==
- 1920 College Football All-America Team
