= Tarzan Taylor =

American football player (1895–1971)

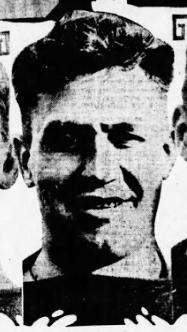
- Taylor while playing for the Canton Bulldogs in 1922

Profile
- Position: Guard

Personal information
- Born: January 10, 1895; Superior, Wisconsin, U.S.
- Died: May 1, 1971 (aged 76); Green Bay, Wisconsin, U.S.
- Listed height: 5 ft 11 in (1.80 m)
- Listed weight: 173 lb (78 kg)

Career information
- College: Hamline (1916–1917); Ohio State (1919–1920)

Career history

Playing
- Chicago Staleys (1921); Canton Bulldogs (1922); Brooklyn Lions / Horsemen (1926)

Coaching
- Michigan Agricultural / State (1923–1925) Line coach; Ohio (1927) Line coach; Ohio State (1928) Line coach; Marquette (1929–1940) Line coach; Baltimore Colts (1947) Line coach; Green Bay Packers (1950–1952) Line coach

Operations
- Chicago Bears (1948–1949) Scout

Awards and highlights
- 2× NFL champion (1921, 1922); First-team All-Big Ten (1920)
- Stats at Pro Football Reference

John Lachlan "Tarzan" Taylor (January 10, 1895 – May 1, 1971) was an American football guard. He played for the Chicago Staleys, Canton Bulldogs, and Brooklyn Lions / Horsemen of the National Football League (NFL). Taylor was a two-time APFA/NFL champion in 1921 and 1922 with the Staleys and Bulldogs respectively. He played college football for Ohio State.

== Early life and college career ==
Taylor was born on January 19, 1895, in Superior, Wisconsin. He attended Central High School and Martins Ferry High School before enrolling at Hamline University. He transferred to Ohio State and was a member of the 1920 football team that went 7–1 and made a Rose Bowl appearance. During his collegiate career, Taylor earned the nickname "Man-Eater." Following his senior season, he was named a consensus First-team All-Big Ten guard.

== Playing career ==
In September 1921, Taylor signed with the Chicago Staleys of the American Professional Football Association (APFA)—now known the National Football League (NFL). He joined former Ohio State football stars Chic Harley and Gaylord Stinchcomb.

In 1922, Taylor joined the Canton Bulldogs of the recently rebranded NFL.

In 1926, after receiving a leave of absence from Taylor's coaching duties, he signed with the Brooklyn Lions / Horsemen of the American Football League (AFL) and later the NFL.

== Coaching career ==
In 1923, Taylor was hired by Ralph H. Young of Michigan Agricultural College—now known as Michigan State University—as the team's line coach. Following the 1925 season Taylor was granted leave.

After one year out of coaching, Taylor was hired as the line coach for Ohio University under head coach Don Peden. In 1928, he was named the line coach for his alma mater, Ohio State. Following John Wilce's retirement, Taylor was not retained by new head coach Sam Willaman. Taylor then was hired by Marquette University for the same position. He was one of the few potential candidates named to fill the Iowa line coach position under head coach Ossie Solem, but he ultimately remained with Marquette. After 12 total seasons, Taylor was eventually not retained after Paddy Driscoll's firing in 1940.

Following Taylor's firing from Marquette, he took a six year break from coaching before returning in 1947 for the Baltimore Colts of the All-America Football Conference (AAFC) under head coach Cecil Isbell.

In 1948, Taylor worked as scout for the Chicago Bears of the NFL.

In 1950, Taylor returned to on-field coaching as the line coach for the Green Bay Packers of the NFL for the newly hired Gene Ronzani. His contract was not renewed when it expired in 1952.

== Personal life ==
In February 1931, Taylor's mother died in Duluth, Minnesota. In September 1931, Taylor was hospitalized in Milwaukee with pneumonia. In December 1934, he was hospitalized again, this time for an ankle fracture he suffered after falling while getting out of his taxi. While attending a Chicago Bears game at Wrigley Field, Taylor suffered a heat attack and was hospitalized at Advocate Illinois Masonic Medical Center.

Taylor died on May 1, 1971, in Green Bay, Wisconsin.
