= 1918 All-Big Ten Conference football team =

American college football all-star team

The 1918 All-Big Ten Conference football team consists of American football players selected to the All-Big Ten Conference teams chosen by various selectors for the 1918 Big Ten Conference football season.

== All Big-Ten selections ==
=== Ends ===
- Clarence A. MacDonald, Ohio State (HP, WE-1)
- Robert Reed, Iowa (HP, WE-1)
- Robert J. Dunne, Michigan (MF)
- George Buchheit, Illinois (MF, WE-2)
- Carl E. Zanger, Northwestern (WE-2)

=== Tackles ===
- Burt Ingwersen, Illinois (HP, MF, WE-1)
- Angus Goetz, Michigan (HP, MF, WE-1)
- Berthold Mann, Wisconsin (WE-2)
- Eugene D. McLaughlin, Northwestern (MF [guard], WE-2)

=== Guards ===
- Albert W. T. Mohr Jr., Illinois (HP, WE-1)
- Harry Hunzelman, Iowa (WE-1)
- Miller, Chicago (HP)
- Wallace, Minnesota (MF)
- Fred R. Hanschmann, Illinois (WE-2)
- F. W. Jordan, Minnesota (WE-2)

=== Centers ===
- Ernie Vick, Michigan (HP, WE-1)
- Jack Depler, Illinois (MF)
- Reber, Chicago (WE-2)

=== Quarterbacks ===
- Marshall Underhill, Northwestern (HP, WE-1)
- Robert H. Fletcher, Illinois (MF)
- William S. Kelly, Iowa (WE-2)

=== Halfbacks ===
- Jess Kirkpatrick, Illinois (HP, WE-1)
- Frank Steketee, Michigan (HP, WE-1)
- Thomas C. Davies, Ohio State (MF)
- Ralph E. Fletcher, Illinois (MF)
- Gus Eckberg, Minnesota (WE-2)
- Elton, Chicago (WE-2)

=== Fullbacks ===
- Norman Kingsley, Minnesota (HP, WE-1)
- William K. Kopp, Illinois (MF)
- Fred Lohman, Iowa (WE-2)

== Key ==
HP = Howard Pearson, sporting editor of the Detroit Journal

MF = Matt Foley in Chicago Herald and Examiner

WE = Walter Eckersall in Chicago Tribune

== See also ==
- 1918 College Football All-America Team
