= 1920 Minnesota Golden Gophers football team =

American college football season

1920 Minnesota Golden Gophers football
- Conference: Big Ten Conference
- Record: 1–6 (0–6 Big Ten)
- Head coach: Henry L. Williams (21st season)
- Captain: Neal Arnston
- Home stadium: Northrop Field

1920 Big Ten Conference football standings
	Conf.					Overall
Team	W		L		T	W		L		T
Ohio State $	5	–	0	–	0	7	–	1	–	0
Wisconsin	4	–	1	–	0	6	–	1	–	0
Indiana	3	–	1	–	0	5	–	2	–	0
Illinois	4	–	2	–	0	5	–	2	–	0
Iowa	3	–	2	–	0	5	–	2	–	0
Michigan	2	–	2	–	0	5	–	2	–	0
Northwestern	2	–	3	–	0	3	–	4	–	0
Chicago	2	–	4	–	0	3	–	4	–	0
Purdue	0	–	4	–	0	2	–	5	–	0
Minnesota	0	–	6	–	0	1	–	6	–	0
$ – Conference champion

The 1920 Minnesota Golden Gophers football team represented the University of Minnesota in the 1920 college football season. In their 21st year under head coach Henry L. Williams, the Golden Gophers compiled a 1–6 record (0–6 against Big Ten Conference opponents) and were outscored by their opponents by a combined score of 92 to 62. The team suffered the program's first ever six-game losing streak, and it finished tied for last place in the conference.

Guard Festus Tierney and halfback Arnold Oss were selected as first-team player on the 1920 All-Big Ten Conference football team.

== Schedule ==
Date	Opponent	Site	Result	Attendance	Source
October 2	North Dakota*	Northrop Field; Minneapolis, MN	W 41–3	10,000	
October 9	at Northwestern	Northwestern Field; Evanston, IL	L 0–17	10,000	
October 16	Indiana	Northrop Field; Minneapolis, MN	L 7–21	12,000	
October 30	at Illinois	Illinois Field; Champaign, IL	L 7–17	15,265	
November 6	Wisconsin	Northrop Field; Minneapolis, MN (rivalry)	L 0–3	22,000	
November 13	at Iowa	Iowa Field; Iowa City, IA (rivalry)	L 7–28	13,000	
November 20	Michigan^{†}	Northrop Field; Minneapolis, MN (Little Brown Jug)	L 0–3	25,000	
*Non-conference game; ^{†}Homecoming
