= Iolas Huffman =

American football and baseball player (1898–1989)

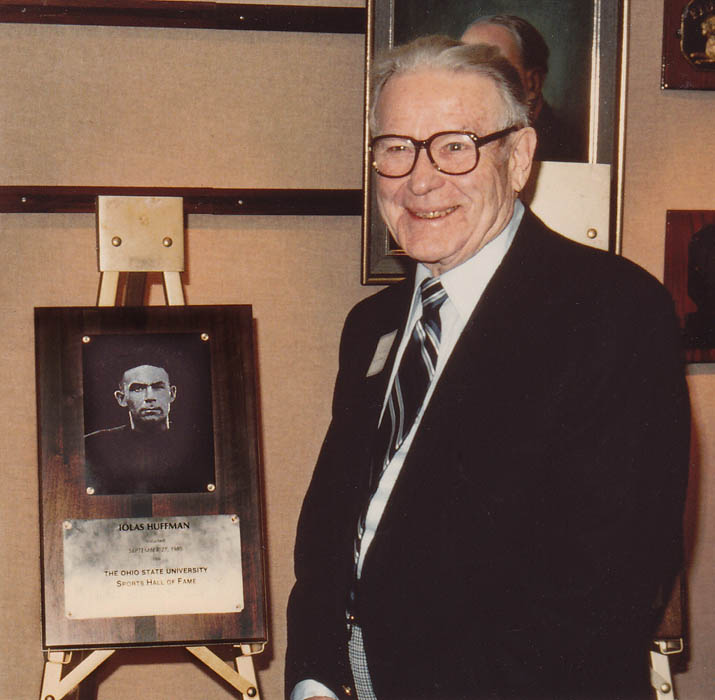
- Huffman with his OSU Sports Hall Of Fame plaque

Profile
- Positions: Tackle, guard

Personal information
- Born: February 4, 1898; Chandlersville, Ohio, U.S.
- Died: November 12, 1989 (aged 91); Cleveland, Ohio, U.S.

Career information
- College: Ohio State

Career history
- 1923: Cleveland Indians
- 1924: Buffalo Bisons

Awards and highlights
- 2× Consensus All-American (1920, 1921); First-team All-Big Ten (1920); Second-team All-Big Ten (1921)
- Stats at Pro Football Reference

Iolas Melitus Huffman (February 4, 1898 – November 12, 1989) was an American football and baseball player. He was a first-team All-American football player for Ohio State in 1920 and 1921. He was also the captain of the 1920 Buckeyes football team that won the Western Conference championship. He also played professional football in the early years of the National Football League for the Cleveland Indians (1923) and Buffalo Bisons (1924).

== Biography ==
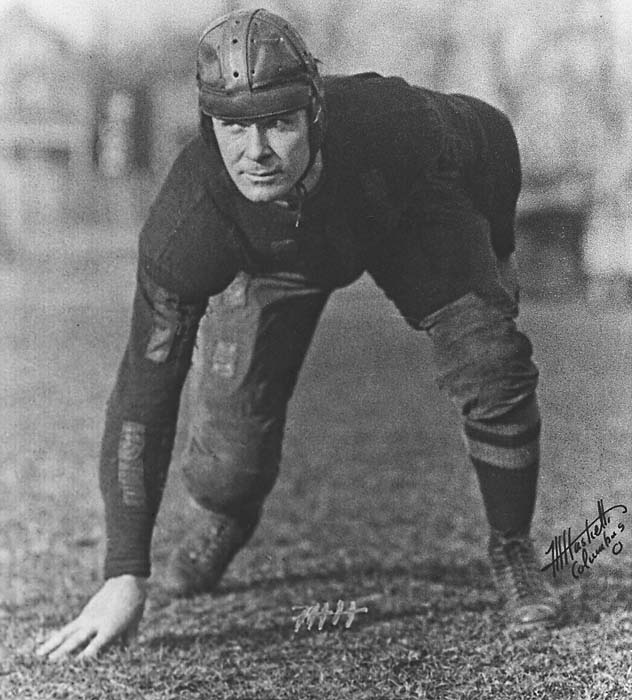
Huffman

Huffman was a native of Chandlersville, Ohio. He enrolled in the medical college at the Ohio State University and played college football and baseball.

Though he had never played football before enrolling at Ohio State, Huffman played four years of varsity football for the Buckeyes. Freshmen were eligible to play football in 1918 due to the exigency of World War I. As a result, Huffman reportedly played for Ohio State's football team in "every quarter of every game save one" in the four years from 1918–1921. At the conclusion of his career at Ohio State, he was "hailed as probably the greatest tackle in Buckeye history."

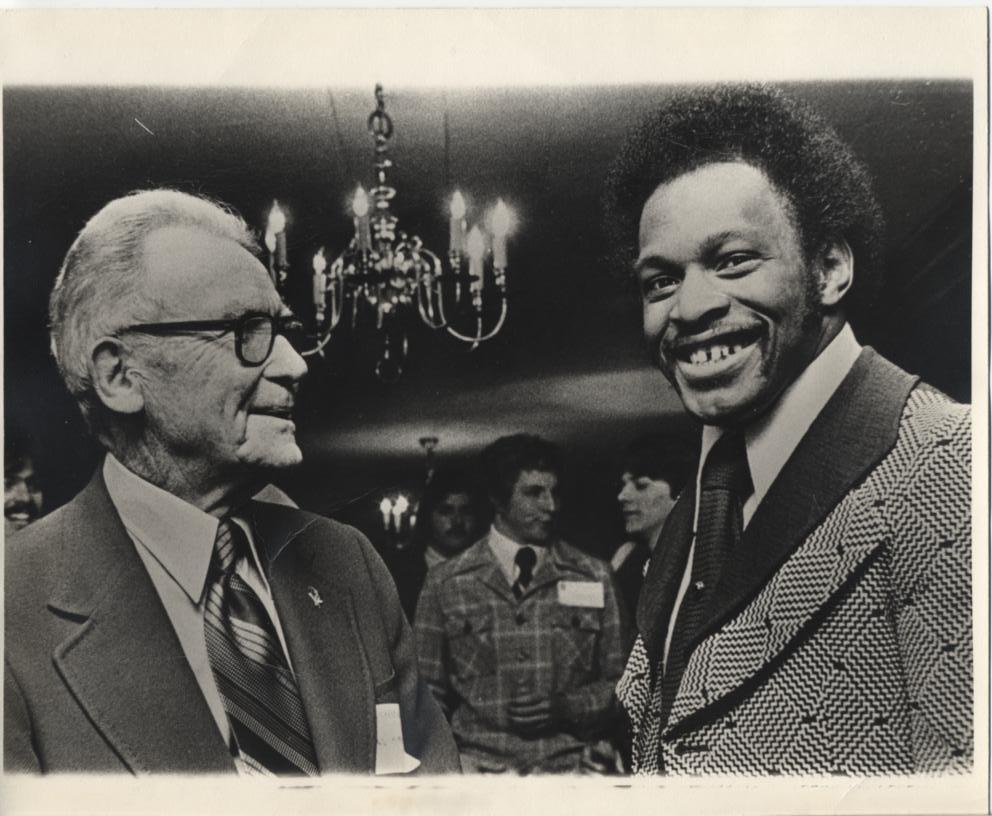
Iolas Huffman and Archie Griffin

As captain of the 1920 football team, Huffman led the Buckeyes to a Western Conference championship. In the 1920 game against Michigan, he blocked a punt by All-American Frank Steketee, which the Buckeyes recovered in Michigan's endzone for a touchdown, the key play in Ohio State's 14–7 win. Huffman was selected as a first-team All-American by syndicated sports writer Lawrence Perry in 1920 and 1921. In 1921, he was selected as a first-team All-American tackle by Football World, based on the collected opinions of 267 coaches. After Ohio State lost to California, 28–0, in the 1921 Rose Bowl, Huffman told reporters, "We were defeated, but at the same time we are not downhearted. I admit that we seemed to lack our usual pep but I do not believe that California is twenty-eight points better than Ohio. It was a great game, and I hope that we will have another opportunity to meet California and reverse the tables."

At the conclusion of his four-year football career at Ohio State, an Ohio newspaper reported:

"Big of frame but not ponderous and gifted with unusual speed for so large a man, Huffman entered college without ever having donned a football suit. Watching varsity practice one night early in the season he vowed he'd like to try his hand at the game. Outfitted with old togs and utterly green at the game he turned up for the varsity (it was the S. A. T. C. year when freshmen were eligible) he quickly adapted himself and soon won a place on the Buckeye line. He is credited with playing in every quarter of every game save one in the four years he held down a varsity berth. As a ball hawk he had few peers. In recent years in Western Conference circles. Time after time he broke thru opposing lines and blocked kicks and on a number of vital occasions converted them into touchdowns."

As a baseball player, Huffman was the catcher for Ohio State for three years. He was known as "a deadly thrower to bases", and few ballplayers in the Western Conference attempted to steal bases on Huffman. He had one of the best batting averages on the Ohio State team, and in 1921 he led Ohio State in stolen bases.

Huffman was offered a tryout as a catcher with Major League Baseball's Cleveland Indians in 1920, and in 1922 the St. Louis Browns offered him a contract as to play for them as a catcher. He played for the Zanesville Greys during the summer of 1922, but at the end of July he decided to give up baseball for the rest of the season because of a sore arm that had kept him on the bench for several weeks.

In the fall of 1923, Huffman turned to professional football in the early days of the National Football League. In 1923, he played for the Cleveland Indians in the first season of the NFL under its current name. In 1924, he played for the Buffalo Bisons. Huffman played in a total of 13 games in the NFL during those two seasons.
