= 1920 Wisconsin Badgers football team =

American college football season

1920 Wisconsin Badgers football
- Conference: Big Ten Conference
- Record: 6–1 (4–1 Big Ten)
- Head coach: John R. Richards (4th season)
- Captain: Frank Weston
- Home stadium: Camp Randall Stadium

1920 Big Ten Conference football standings
	Conf.					Overall
Team	W		L		T	W		L		T
Ohio State $	5	–	0	–	0	7	–	1	–	0
Wisconsin	4	–	1	–	0	6	–	1	–	0
Indiana	3	–	1	–	0	5	–	2	–	0
Illinois	4	–	2	–	0	5	–	2	–	0
Iowa	3	–	2	–	0	5	–	2	–	0
Michigan	2	–	2	–	0	5	–	2	–	0
Northwestern	2	–	3	–	0	3	–	4	–	0
Chicago	2	–	4	–	0	3	–	4	–	0
Purdue	0	–	4	–	0	2	–	5	–	0
Minnesota	0	–	6	–	0	1	–	6	–	0
$ – Conference champion

The 1920 Wisconsin Badgers football team was an American football team that represented the University of Wisconsin in the 1920 Big Ten Conference football season. The team compiled a 6–1 record (4–1 against conference opponents), finished in second place in the Big Ten Conference, shut out four of seven opponents, and outscored all opponents by a combined total of 141 to 29. John R. Richards was in his fourth year as Wisconsin's head coach.

End Frank Weston was the team captain. Guard Ralph Scott was a consensus first-team All-American. In addition, Frank Weston and center George Bunge were selected as first-team All-Americans by the Frank Menke Syndicate and Lawrence Perry, respectively. Those three (Weston, Scott, and Bunge) and Al Elliott received first-team All-Big Ten honors.

== Schedule ==
Date	Opponent	Site	Result	Attendance	Source
October 2	Lawrence*	Camp Randall Stadium; Madison, WI	W 60–0		
October 9	Michigan Agricultural*	Camp Randall Stadium; Madison, WI	W 27–0		
October 16	Northwestern	Camp Randall Stadium; Madison, WI	W 27–7	10,000	
October 23	at Ohio State	Ohio Field; Columbus, OH	L 7–13		
November 6	at Minnesota	Northrop Field; Minneapolis, MN (rivalry)	W 3–0	22,000	
November 13	Illinois^{†}	Camp Randall Stadium; Madison, WI	W 14–9	20,257	
November 20	at Chicago	Stagg Field; Chicago, IL	W 3–0		
*Non-conference game; ^{†}Homecoming
