= 1920 Illinois Fighting Illini football team =

American college football season

1920 Illinois Fighting Illini football
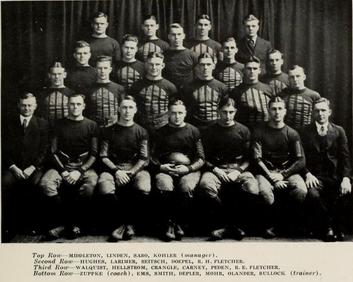
- Conference: Big Ten Conference
- Record: 5–2 (4–2 Big Ten)
- Head coach: Robert Zuppke (8th season)
- Captain: J. C. Depler
- Home stadium: Illinois Field

Uniform
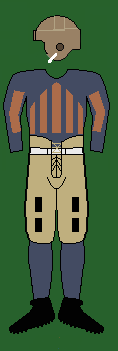

1920 Big Ten Conference football standings
	Conf.					Overall
Team	W		L		T	W		L		T
Ohio State $	5	–	0	–	0	7	–	1	–	0
Wisconsin	4	–	1	–	0	6	–	1	–	0
Indiana	3	–	1	–	0	5	–	2	–	0
Illinois	4	–	2	–	0	5	–	2	–	0
Iowa	3	–	2	–	0	5	–	2	–	0
Michigan	2	–	2	–	0	5	–	2	–	0
Northwestern	2	–	3	–	0	3	–	4	–	0
Chicago	2	–	4	–	0	3	–	4	–	0
Purdue	0	–	4	–	0	2	–	5	–	0
Minnesota	0	–	6	–	0	1	–	6	–	0
$ – Conference champion

The 1920 Illinois Fighting Illini football team was an American football team that represented the University of Illinois during the 1920 college football season. In their eighth season under head coach Robert Zuppke, the Illini compiled a 5–2 record and finished in fourth place in the Big Ten Conference. Center J. C. Depler was the team captain.

== Schedule ==
Date	Opponent	Site	Result	Attendance	Source
October 9	Drake*	Illinois Field; Champaign, IL	W 41–0	4,435	
October 16	Iowa	Illinois Field; Champaign, IL	W 20–3	10,480	
October 23	at Michigan	Ferry Field; Ann Arbor, MI (rivalry)	W 7–6	27,655	
October 30	Minnesota	Illinois Field; Champaign, IL	W 17–7	15,265	
November 6	at Chicago	Stagg Field; Chicago, Illinois	W 3–0	27,545	
November 13	at Wisconsin	Camp Randall Stadium; Madison, WI	L 9–14	20,257	
November 20	Ohio State	Illinois Field; Champaign, IL (rivalry)	L 0–7	19,921	
*Non-conference game

== Awards and honors ==
- Chuck Carney, End: Consensus All-American
- Albert Mohr, guard: All-American
- Jack Depler, center: All-American
- Jack Crangle, fullback: : All-American
