= Robert H. Fletcher =

American football player and coach (1900–1968)

Bob Fletcher
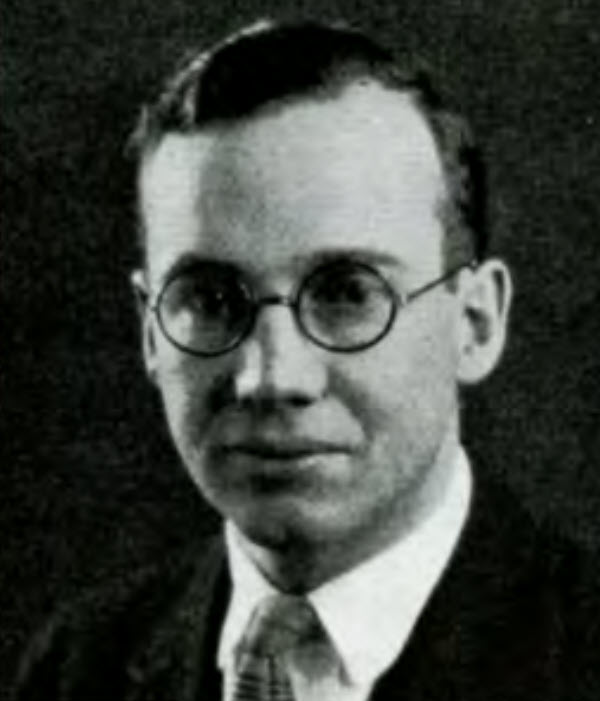

Biographical details
- Born: February 28, 1900
- Died: August 5, 1968 (aged 68); Findlay, Ohio, U.S.

Playing career

Football
- 1918–1920: Illinois
- Position: Quarterback

Coaching career (HC unless noted)

Football
- 1921–1923: Findlay HS (OH)
- 1924–1929: Case Tech

Basketball
- 1924–1929: Case Tech

Head coaching record
- Overall: 19–27–7 (college football); 30–29 (college basketball)

Robert H. Fletcher (February 28, 1900 – August 5, 1968) was an American football player and coach.

== Playing career ==
Fletcher played quarterback for the Illinois Fighting Illini football from 1918 to 1920. His 1919 Illinois Fighting Illini football team famously won the national title, after he kicked a game-winning field goal to defeat Ohio State. He was named All-Big Ten Conference in 1918, 1919, and 1920. He was also named to the All-Western college football team of 1920.

== Head football coach ==
Fletcher first coached three seasons as the head football coach of Findlay High School in Findlay, Ohio from 1921 to 1923, amassing a record of 24–6.

In 1924, he moved to Cleveland to coach at the Case School of Applied Science, known today as Case Western Reserve University. Fletcher coached both the school's football and basketball teams. His overall football record was 19–27–7 and his overall basketball record was 30–29.

== Head coaching record ==
=== College football ===
Year	Team	Overall	Conference	Standing	Bowl/playoffs
Case Tech Scientists (Ohio Athletic Conference) (1924–1929)
1924	Case	6–2–1	6–2–1	4th	
1925	Case	3–4–2	3–4–2	11th	
1926	Case	4–2–3	4–2–3	12th	
1927	Case	2–6	2–6	T–17th	
1928	Case	2–6–1	1–4–1	10th	
1929	Case	2–7	1–6	T–13th	
Case:		19–27–7	17–24–7		
Total:		19–27–7			
