= Frank Steketee =

American football player (1900–1951)

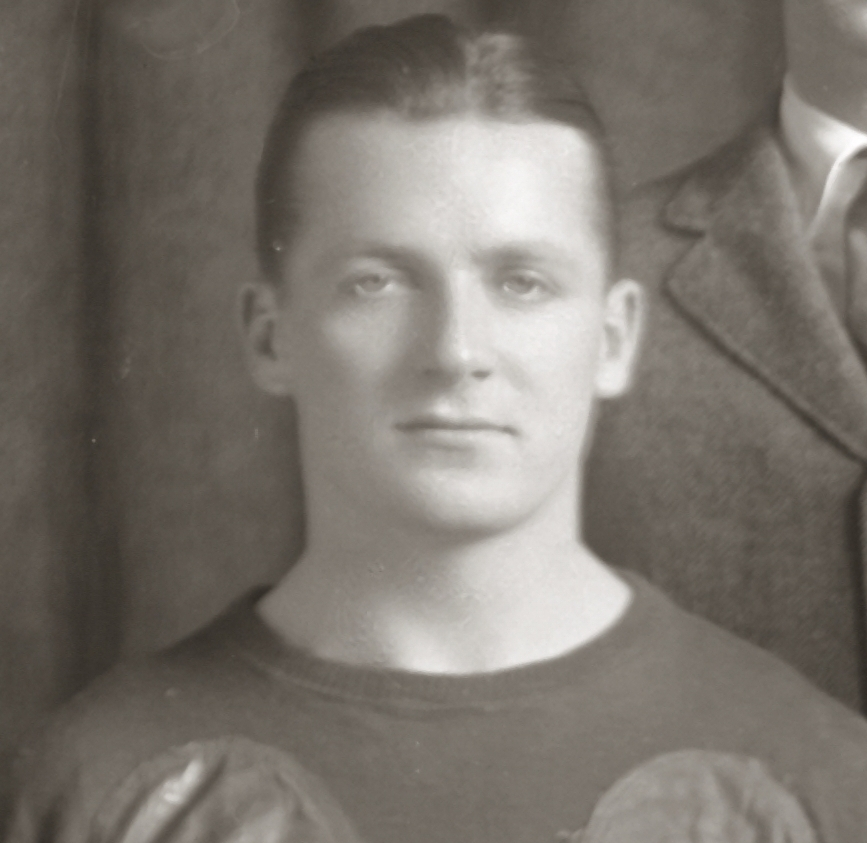
- Frank Steketee cropped from 1921 Michigan football team photograph

Profile
- Positions: Fullback, halfback

Personal information
- Born: April 26, 1900; Grand Rapids, Michigan, U.S.
- Died: December 26, 1951 (aged 51); Lansing, Michigan, U.S.

Career information
- College: Michigan (1918, 1920–1921)

Awards and highlights
- National champion (1918); First-team All-American (1918); First-team All-Big Ten (1920)

Frank Wallder Steketee (April 26, 1900 – December 26, 1951) was an American football player.

A native of Grand Rapids, Michigan, Steketee played college football as a fullback and halfback for Fielding H. Yost's 1918, 1920, and 1921 Michigan Wolverines football teams. As a freshman in 1918, he helped lead Michigan to an undefeated season and retroactive national championship and was selected by Walter Camp as a first-team player on the 1918 College Football All-America Team.

Steketee missed the 1919 season while serving in the United States Navy, but returned to the Michigan football team in 1920 and was selected as a first-team player on the 1920 All-Big Ten Conference football team. During three years at Michigan, Steketee was regarded as one of the best kickers and punters in football.

Steketee again served in the military during World War II. After his discharge, he worked as an account examiner for the finance division of Michigan Department of Highways until his death in 1951.

== Early life ==
Steketee's grandfather, John Steketee, was part of a wave of Dutch immigration to western Michigan in the late 1840s. The family moved to Grand Rapids in 1860. Steketee's father, Jacob Steketee, studied law at the University of Michigan and then returned to Grand Rapids where he married Frances Walder.

Steketee was born to Jacob and Frances Steketee in 1900 at Grand Rapids. Steketee attended Grand Rapids Central High School where he was president of the Class of 1918, captain of the 1917 football team, and a member of the track team. The caption to his senior yearbook photograph reads: "Handsome is as handsome does."

== University of Michigan ==
Steketee enrolled at the University of Michigan in the fall of 1918. While at Michigan, he was a member of Alpha Delta Phi, Michigamua, and the Sphinx and was chosen president of the freshman class during the 1918–1919 academic year. He graduated with the Class of 1922.

During his time at Michigan, Steketee was a star football player. There are press accounts of Steketee once having kicked a record 100-yard punt. According to one account: "I remember The Saturday Evening Post doing a writeup on U. of M. It told how Frank Steketee stood behind his own goal posts and made a punt which was picked up by the opposing team behind their goal posts." In his book on the history of Michigan football, Bruce Madej wrote: "As a result of his prodigious field goals, Stek is given credit for Michigan victories over Syracuse, Illinois and Minnesota."

While best known for his accomplishments as a football player, Steketee also competed in other sports as well. In February 1919, he registered one of the highest physical fitness scores ever recorded in testing performed by the university. He was a member of Michigan's first swimming team, swam the 20-yard freestyle event in 9-3/5 seconds, and was also a skilled diver. Although gymnastics was not yet a varsity sport, he was an accomplished gymnast, and his work on the parallel bars was credited with expanding his range of motion so that he could kick higher than his head. As a senior, he also competed on the Michigan golf team. According to one account, he also played for Michigan's hockey team. His grandson, Michigan Court of Appeals Judge David H. Sawyer, said: "He was one of these athletes who did everything."

=== 1918 football season ===
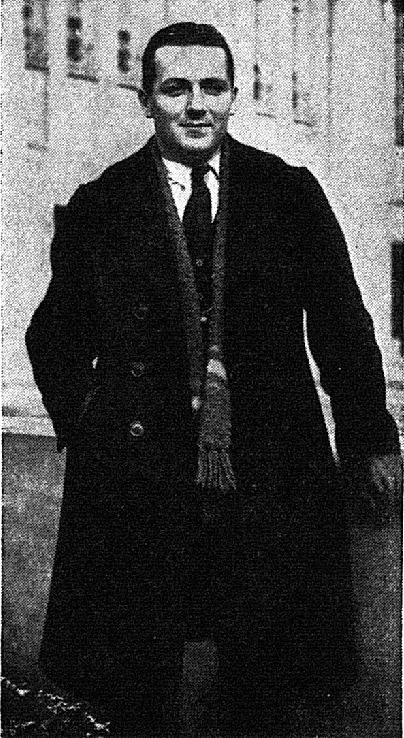
Frank Steketee, 1921

As a freshman, Steketee started four games at fullback for the 1918 Michigan Wolverines football team. In a season shortened to five games due to the 1918 flu pandemic and war-related travel restrictions, the Wolverines compiled a perfect 5–0 record and have been recognized retroactively as national champions. The 1918 team shut out four of its opponents, including a 14–0 shutout over Ohio State. For the season, the team outscored all opponents by a combined total of 96 to 6.

In the opening game of the 1918 season against Case Institute of Technology, Steketee entered the game as a substitute and made an impressive debut. In a 33–0 victory, Steketee accounted for 21 points, "making three of the five touchdowns and kicking three out of five attempts at goal."

In the third game of the season, Steketee's performance was even more impressive. Michigan defeated Syracuse, 15–0, on a field inches deep in mud, with rain falling throughout the game. Steketee scored all 15 points in the game, kicking three field goals and scoring a touchdown. The Syracuse Herald reported: "One man stood out in the Michigan triumph, Steketee of Grand Rapids. He made the entire 15 points scored by his team and otherwise mussed up perfect good intentions on the part of the visitors." In the fourth quarter, Steketee also intercepted a pass and ran 20 yards for a touchdown.

The final game of the 1918 season pitted the undefeated Wolverines against the undefeated Ohio State Buckeyes. In a 14–0 victory, Steketee again had a hand in all 14 points scored. The game was scoreless in the fourth quarter when Steketee kicked a 73-yard punt that pinned Ohio State at its two-yard line. Ohio State attempted to punt out of its end zone, but Michigan's Angus Goetz broke through and blocked the punt which was recovered for a touchdown. Steketee also threw a touchdown pass to end Robert Dunne from Ohio State's 12-yard line and kicked two extra points.

At the end of the 1918 season, Steketee was selected as a first-team halfback on the 1918 All-Big Ten Conference football team. Even though Steketee played at fullback, Walter Eckersall of the Chicago Tribune picked him as a halfback on the basis of Steketee's passing and kicking talent. He was also selected by Walter Camp as the first-team fullback on the 1918 College Football All-America Team. He was the only western player to receive first-team honors from Camp that year and the first player in Michigan history to be named an All-American in his freshman year. The freshman rule had been relaxed in 1918 because of World War I.

At a football dinner held at the Michigan Union in March 1919, Michigan football coach Fielding H. Yost presented Steketee with an engraved gold watch in "appreciation of his excellent services during the 1918 season."

=== United States Navy ===
Following the United States' entry into World War I, Steketee enlisted in the United States Navy on September 26, 1918. He was discharged on September 30, 1921. He missed the 1919 season due to military service. Without Steketee in the lineup, the Wolverines' record dropped to 3–4 in 1919, as they gave up 102 points, 96 points more than they had allowed in 1918.

=== 1920 football season ===
In July 1920, The New York Times reported on Steketee's return, noting that Michigan supporters were "greatly rejoiced by the announcement from the office of the Registrar of the University that Frank Steketee, the famous 1918 All-American fullback, will be eligible for the 1920 eleven." The paper also opined that, had Steketee been eligible in 1919, "the season's long succession of defeats might have been averted."

As the season got underway, newspapers asked the question: "Is Michigan Coming Back?" One wire service account noted: "Frank Steketee, a member of the 1918 team, and who was given the position of fullback on Walter Camp's All-American eleven, will be back on the line-plunging job this year. Steketee is as good a booter as they come, and he promises to be one of the national gridiron stars again this year."

With Steketee back in the lineup, the Wolverines improved to 5–2 in 1920, outscoring opponents by a combined total of 121 to 21.

In the 1920 Illinois game, Michigan lost, 7–6, as a 50-yard place kick by Steketee with a few minutes left missed "by a few inches."

The season's other loss came to Ohio State, 14–7. However, an Ohio newspaper account noted that, despite the loss, "Steketee was the offensive star for the Wolverines, his 26-yard gain around right end in the first quarter being the most spectacular run of the game." Another account reported: "Several spectacular gains by Steketee for Michigan featured the third period."

Though no Wolverine player named to the All-American team in 1920, Steketee was selected as a first-team halfback on the 1920 All-Big Ten Conference football team.

=== 1921 football season ===
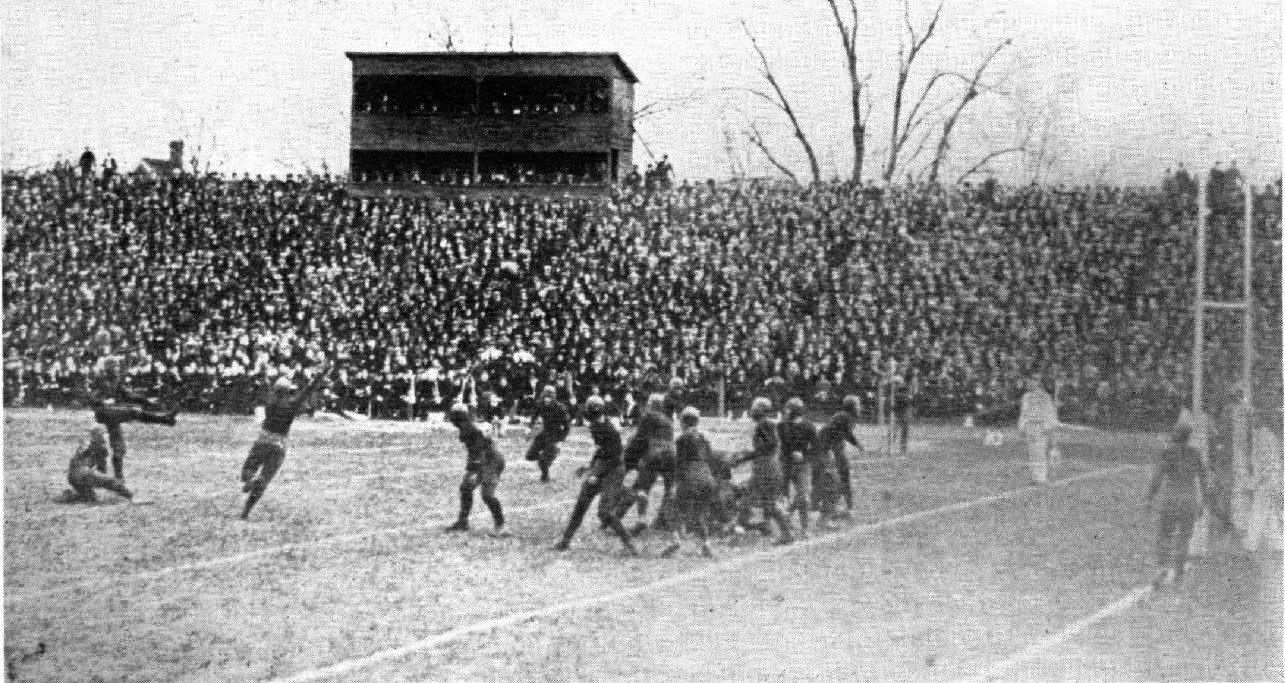
Steketee kicks the winning field goal in a 3–0 win over Illinois in October 1921.

As a senior, Steketee started three games at fullback and two at halfback, as the 1921 Wolverines improved to a 5–1–1 record and outscored their opponents, 187–21.

Pre-season accounts noted: "In Frank Steketee, Michigan has one of the best distance punters in the conference."

After losing to Ohio State, 14–0, Michigan rebounded the following week to defeat Illinois, 3–0, on a placement kick by Steketee. The New York Times reported that Steketee was "the outstanding figure of the Michigan offense." Steketee scored the game's only points on a kick from the 15-yard line near the end of the first half. Later in the game, Steketee "broke up the match" when he intercepted a long pass, and later "broke through and blocked Anderson's attempted place kick."

Steketee's final game in a Michigan uniform came against rival Minnesota in the battle for the Little Brown Jug. Michigan beat Minnesota, 38–0, as Steketee scored a touchdown after Michigan's Frank Cappon fumbled the ball at the Minnesota four-yard line, the ball rolled across the goal-line and Steketee pounced on it. Steketee also had a long run in the fourth quarter to set up Michigan's final score.

== Family and later years ==
Steketee was married twice. He married Marion E. Cornelius in December 1923. Steketee and his first wife had a daughter Marcia (born c. 1925, later known as Mrs. Harold Sawyer) and a son Frank Jr. (born 1927). He later married Emma Zalma Reider in April 1945 in Lansing, Michigan.

Steketee served as a medic in World War II. He enlisted in the Army Air Corps on October 20, 1942, and was discharged on September 16, 1944. After being discharged from the military, Steketee worked as an account examiner for the finance division of the Michigan Department of Highways for seven years from approximately 1944 until his death in 1951.

On the day after Christmas in 1951, Steketee collapsed shortly before noon at his desk in the state highway department headquarters. He died three hours later at Lansing's St. Lawrence Hospital. The cause of death was reported to be a heart attack. He was buried at Deepdale Cemetery in Lansing.

Steketee was posthumously inducted into the Grand Rapids Sports Hall of Fame in 2005.

== See also ==
- List of Michigan Wolverines football All-Americans
