= 1920 Iowa Hawkeyes football team =

American college football season

1920 Iowa Hawkeyes football
- Conference: Big Ten Conference
- Record: 5–2 (3–2 Big Ten)
- Head coach: Howard Jones (5th season)
- Offensive scheme: Single-wing
- Captain: William Kelly
- Home stadium: Iowa Field

Uniform
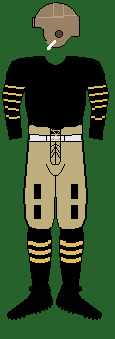

1920 Big Ten Conference football standings
	Conf.					Overall
Team	W		L		T	W		L		T
Ohio State $	5	–	0	–	0	7	–	1	–	0
Wisconsin	4	–	1	–	0	6	–	1	–	0
Indiana	3	–	1	–	0	5	–	2	–	0
Illinois	4	–	2	–	0	5	–	2	–	0
Iowa	3	–	2	–	0	5	–	2	–	0
Michigan	2	–	2	–	0	5	–	2	–	0
Northwestern	2	–	3	–	0	3	–	4	–	0
Chicago	2	–	4	–	0	3	–	4	–	0
Purdue	0	–	4	–	0	2	–	5	–	0
Minnesota	0	–	6	–	0	1	–	6	–	0
$ – Conference champion

The 1920 Iowa Hawkeyes football team was an American football team that represented the University of Iowa as a member of the Big Ten Conference during the 1920 Big Ten football season. In their fifth year under head coach Howard Jones, the Hawkeyes compiled a 5–2 record (3–2 in conference games), finished in fifth place in the Big Ten, and outscored opponents by a total of 142 to 54. The season was part of a 20-game winning streak that began on November 6, 1920, and continued until October 20, 1923.

The team played its home games at Iowa Field in Iowa City, Iowa.

== Schedule ==
Date	Opponent	Site	Result	Attendance	Source
October 2	at Indiana	Jordan Field; Bloomington, IN	W 14–7		
October 9	Cornell (IA)*	Iowa Field; Iowa City, IA	W 63–0		
October 16	at Illinois	Illinois Field; Champaign, IL	L 0–10		
October 23	at Chicago	Stagg Field; Chicago, IL	L 0–10		
November 6	Northwestern	Iowa Field; Iowa City, IA	W 20–0		
November 13	Minnesota^{†}	Iowa Field; Iowa City, IA (rivalry)	W 28–7	13,000	
November 20	at Iowa State*	State Field; Ames, IA (rivalry)	W 14–10		
*Non-conference game; ^{†}Homecoming
