= John Wilce =

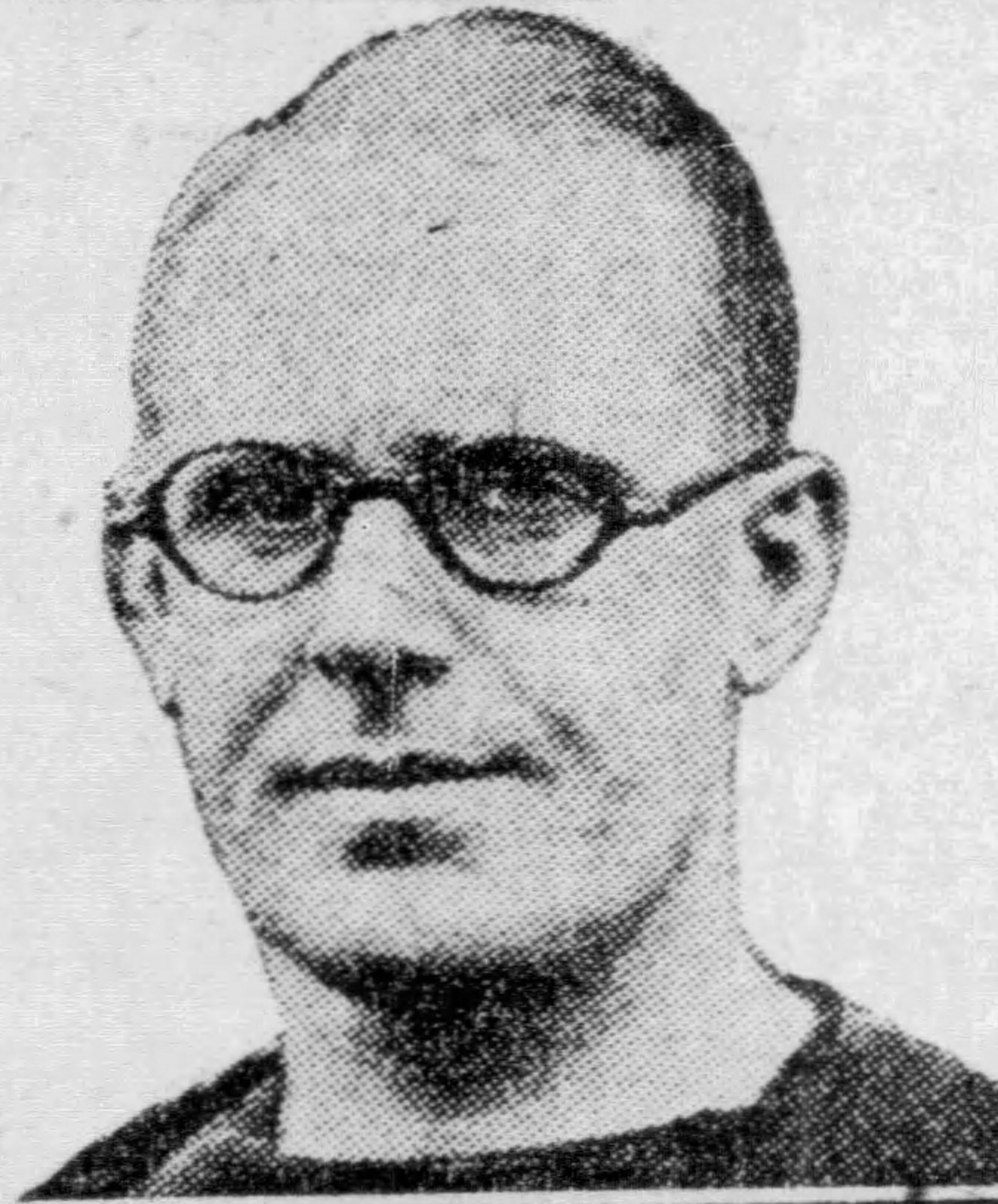

Biographical details
- Born: May 12, 1888; Rochester, New York, U.S.
- Died: May 17, 1963 (aged 75); Westerville, Ohio, U.S.

Playing career
- 1907–1909: Wisconsin
- Position: Fullback

Coaching career (HC unless noted)
- 1911–1912: Wisconsin (assistant)
- 1913–1928: Ohio State

Head coaching record
- Overall: 78–33–9
- Bowls: 0–1

Accomplishments and honors

Championships
- 3 Western / Big Ten (1916–1917, 1920)

Awards
- Amos Alonzo Stagg Award (1959)
- College Football Hall of Fame; Inducted in 1954 (profile)

John Woodworth Wilce (May 12, 1888 – May 17, 1963) was an American college football player and coach, physician, and university professor. He served as the head football coach at Ohio State University from 1913 to 1928, compiling a record of 78–33–9. Wilce coached Chic Harley and led Ohio State to their first win over rival Michigan, in 1919. He was inducted into the College Football Hall of Fame as a coach in 1954.

== Early life, family and education ==
Wilce was born in 1888 at Rochester, New York, the son of John W. Wilce, a stonecutter who emigrated from England to the United States in 1867. His mother was Rosette (Woodward) Wilce.

Wilce was raised in Milwaukee, Wisconsin, and attended West Division High School where he was captain of the basketball team and also competed in track and field.

He subsequently attended the University of Wisconsin where he played fullback for the Wisconsin Badgers football team, starting in 1907. In December 1908, he was elected as the captain of the 1909 Wisconsin Badgers football team. He also rowed varsity crew and was a substitute on the basketball team.

In 1919, Wilce received his Ph.D. in medicine from Ohio State University.

== Coaching career ==
=== Wisconsin ===
Following his graduation from Wisconsin, Wilce was hired as coach of the athletic teams at the high school in La Crosse, Wisconsin.

Wilce resigned his post at La Crosse in July 1911 to accept a position as graduate manager of athletics at the University of Wisconsin. He was also an assistant football coach and assistant professor of physical education at Wisconsin.

=== Ohio State ===
In April 1913, Wilce was hired as the head football coach at Ohio State University. That fall, Ohio State changed conference affiliation from the Ohio Athletic Conference to the Western Conference, later the Big Ten Conference. Despite playing at a higher level of competition, Wilce's teams fared well, compiling records of 4–2–1 in 1913, 5–2 in 1914, and 5–1–1 in 1915. With consensus All-American halfback Chic Harley leading the way, Wilce's 1916 team compiled a perfect 7–0 record and won Ohio State's first conference championship. With Harley still in the backfield, Wilce's 1917 team compiled its second consecutive undefeated season (8–0–1) and conference championship.

In 1919, Wilce led Ohio State to a 6–1 record and a 13–3 victory over Michigan. It was the first Ohio State victory in the history of the Michigan–Ohio State football rivalry. Wilce's 1920 team, led by halfback Gaylord Stinchcomb and linemen Iolas Huffman and Tarzan Taylor, defeated Michigan for the second straight year, won the Big Ten championship, and went undefeated in the regular season. The 1920 team received an invitation to play in the 1921 Rose Bowl where they lost to national champion California.

After winning three conference championships between 1916 and 1920, Wilce's teams had three consecutive losing seasons from 1922 to 1924. In the dedication game for Ohio Stadium on October 21, 1922, the Buckeyes lost to Michigan by a 19–0 score. The New York Times described the 1922 Michigan–Ohio State game as "the greatest day in mid Western football history."

Wilce turned the program around in 1926, as his team compiled a 7–1 record, the only loss being to Michigan by a close 17–16 score. The 1927 Ohio State team compiled a 4–4 record, and Wilce in June 1928 tendered his resignation to the Ohio State athletic board, effective in June 1929. Wilce wrote to the board: "I herewith tender my resignation as head football coach of Ohio State University to take effect June, 1929. It is my intention to enter the active practice of medicine and to continue a degree of teaching." In his final season as Ohio State's coach, Wilce's 1928 Ohio State team compiled a 5–2–1 record, including a 19–7 victory over Michigan.

Of his departure from coaching, Wilce said: "Football was becoming too much of a business. The game was being taken away from the boys. I was a faculty-type coach who believed educational aspects were more important than winning games."

In 16 seasons as Ohio State's football coach, Wilce compiled a 78–33–9 record. Wilce's 16 years as Ohio State's football coach remained the longest tenure in school history until 1967 when Woody Hayes surpassed the mark.

== Medical and academic career ==
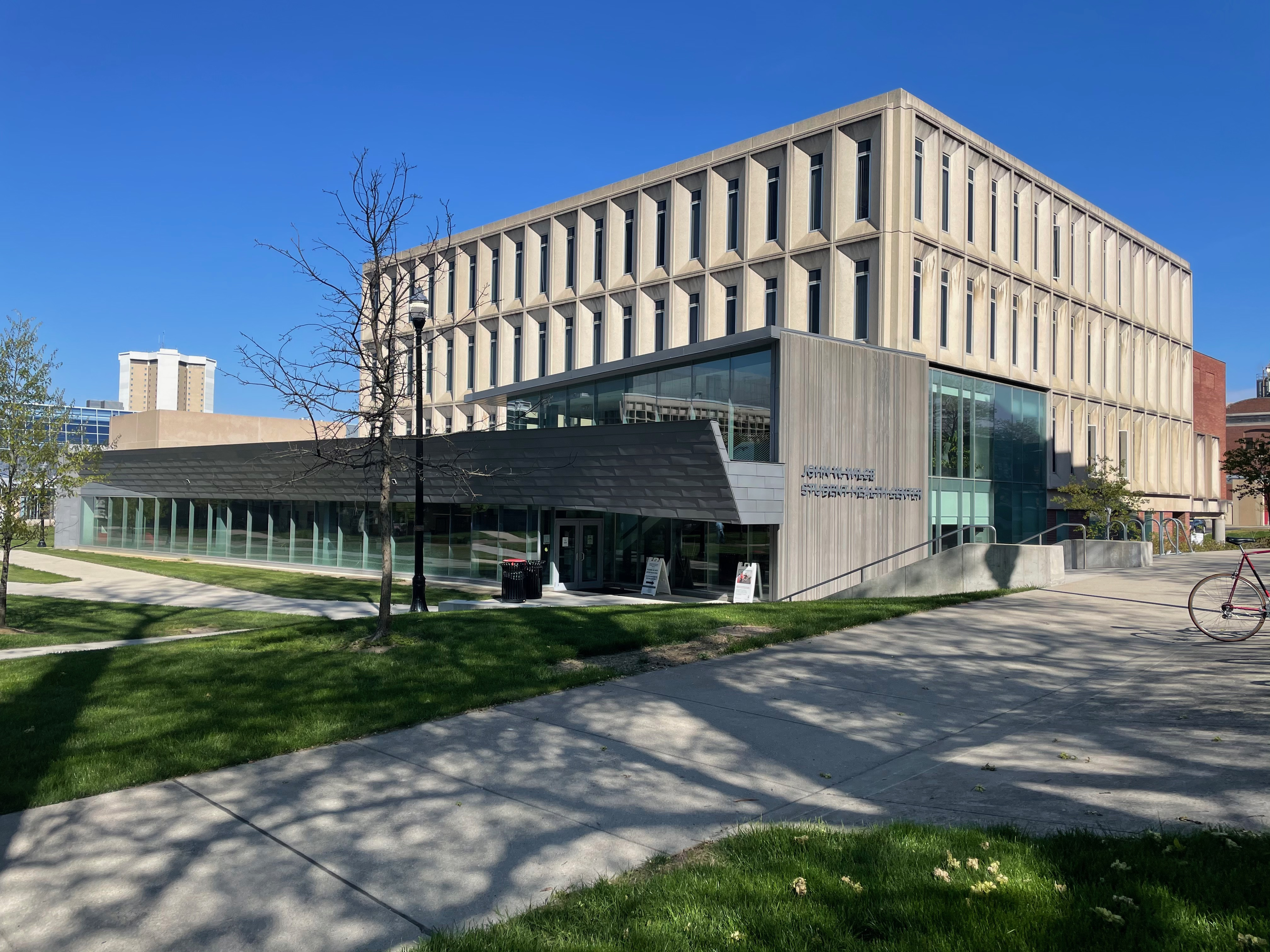
The Wilce Student Health Center, named in honor of John Wilce

He retired from football after the 1928 season to practice medicine. Wilce completed postgraduate training in cardiology at University of Edinburgh in the 1930s and was a professor of preventive medicine at Ohio State University College of Medicine, specializing in research and treatment of heart disease. He also served as Director of Student Health Services from 1934 to 1958. The John W. Wilce Student Health Center, built in 1969, is named for Wilce.

Wilce's "combination of medicine and football" and a sense of propriety that reflected his English heritage led him to try to reform the speech of his players on and off the field. He coined the phrase "intestinal fortitude." Haber (1955) records the story of the coinage, the idea first coming to Wilce on the way to a lecture he was to present on anatomy and physiology at Ohio State in 1916, his first use of the phrase in public in a lecture to his team, and how he began to hear the phrase used by others.

== Honors ==
In August 1954, Wilce was elected to elected the College Football Hall of Fame as part of the second induction class. He was also elected a member of the Ohio State Varsity O Hall of Fame in 1977. His honors include the Ohio State Distinguished Service Award in 1956.

== Personal life and death ==
Wilce and his wife Minerva Connor Wilce had four children: sons Jay and James M. "Jim" Wilce (1922–1988), and daughters Rosanne Wilce Pearcy and Dorothy Wilce Krause. Among their many grandchildren are the sports and outdoors photographer Anne Krause (1952–2006) and James M. "Jim" Wilce, Jr., a linguistic anthropologist at Northern Arizona University.

Wilce suffered a stroke in March 1962 and was hospitalized for several weeks at University Hospital in Columbus. He died in May 1963 at his home in Westerville, Ohio, a suburb of Columbus.

== Head coaching record ==
Year	Team	Overall	Conference	Standing	Bowl/playoffs
Ohio State Buckeyes (Western Conference / Big Ten Conference) (1913–1928)
1913	Ohio State	4–2–1	1–2	T–7th	
1914	Ohio State	5–2	2–2	T–4th	
1915	Ohio State	5–1–1	2–1–1	4th	
1916	Ohio State	7–0	4–0	1st	
1917	Ohio State	8–0–1	4–0	1st	
1918	Ohio State	3–3	0–3	9th	
1919	Ohio State	6–1	3–1	2nd	
1920	Ohio State	7–1	5–0	1st	L Rose
1921	Ohio State	5–2	4–1	T–2nd	
1922	Ohio State	3–4	1–4	8th	
1923	Ohio State	3–4–1	1–4	T–8th	
1924	Ohio State	2–3–3	1–3–2	7th	
1925	Ohio State	4–3–1	1–3–1	8th	
1926	Ohio State	7–1	3–1	3rd	
1927	Ohio State	4–4	2–3	T–6th	
1928	Ohio State	5–2–1	3–2	T–4th	
Ohio State:		78–33–9	37–30–4		
Total:		78–33–9			

== Sources ==
- Haber, Tom Burns; "The Origin of 'Intestinal Fortitude.' American Speech 30(3):235-237.
- Park, Jack; The Official OHIO STATE Football Encyclopedia (2002), Sports Publishing L.L.C., ISBN 1-58261-006-1
