= 1920 Northwestern Purple football team =

American college football season

1920 Northwestern Purple football
- Conference: Big Ten Conference
- Record: 3–4 (2–3 Big Ten)
- Head coach: Elmer McDevitt (1st season)
- Captain: Graham Penfield
- Home stadium: Northwestern Field

1920 Big Ten Conference football standings
	Conf.					Overall
Team	W		L		T	W		L		T
Ohio State $	5	–	0	–	0	7	–	1	–	0
Wisconsin	4	–	1	–	0	6	–	1	–	0
Indiana	3	–	1	–	0	5	–	2	–	0
Illinois	4	–	2	–	0	5	–	2	–	0
Iowa	3	–	2	–	0	5	–	2	–	0
Michigan	2	–	2	–	0	5	–	2	–	0
Northwestern	2	–	3	–	0	3	–	4	–	0
Chicago	2	–	4	–	0	3	–	4	–	0
Purdue	0	–	4	–	0	2	–	5	–	0
Minnesota	0	–	6	–	0	1	–	6	–	0
$ – Conference champion

The 1920 Northwestern Purple team represented Northwestern University during the 1920 college football season. In their first year under head coach Elmer McDevitt, the Purple compiled a 3 – 4 record (2–3 against Big Ten Conference opponents) and finished in seventh place in the Big Ten Conference.

== Schedule ==
Date	Opponent	Site	Result	Attendance	Source
October 2	Knox (IL)*	Northwestern Field; Evanston, IL	W 14–0		
October 9	Minnesota	Northwestern Field; Evanston, IL	W 17–0		
October 16	at Wisconsin	Randall Field; Madison, WI	L 7–27	10,000	
October 30	vs. Indiana	Washington Park; Indianapolis, IN	L 7–10	12,000	
November 6	at Iowa	Iowa Field; Iowa City, IA	L 0–20		
November 13	Purdue^{†}	Northwestern Field; Evanston, IL	W 14–0	10,000	
November 20	Notre Dame*	Northwestern Field; Evanston, IL (rivalry)	L 7–33	20,000	
*Non-conference game; ^{†}Homecoming
