= 1920 Indiana Hoosiers football team =

American college football season

1920 Indiana Hoosiers football
- Conference: Big Ten Conference
- Record: 5–2 (3–1 Big Ten)
- Head coach: Ewald O. Stiehm (5th season)
- Captain: Elliott Risley
- Home stadium: Jordan Field

1920 Big Ten Conference football standings
	Conf.					Overall
Team	W		L		T	W		L		T
Ohio State $	5	–	0	–	0	7	–	1	–	0
Wisconsin	4	–	1	–	0	6	–	1	–	0
Indiana	3	–	1	–	0	5	–	2	–	0
Illinois	4	–	2	–	0	5	–	2	–	0
Iowa	3	–	2	–	0	5	–	2	–	0
Michigan	2	–	2	–	0	5	–	2	–	0
Northwestern	2	–	3	–	0	3	–	4	–	0
Chicago	2	–	4	–	0	3	–	4	–	0
Purdue	0	–	4	–	0	2	–	5	–	0
Minnesota	0	–	6	–	0	1	–	6	–	0
$ – Conference champion

The 1920 Indiana Hoosiers football team represented the Indiana Hoosiers in the 1920 college football season as members of the Big Ten Conference. The Hoosiers played their home games at Jordan Field in Bloomington, Indiana. The team was coached by Ewald O. Stiehm, in his fifth year as head coach.

== Schedule ==
Date	Opponent	Site	Result	Attendance	Source
September 25	Franklin (IN)*	Jordan Field; Bloomington, IN	W 47–0		
October 2	Iowa	Jordan Field; Bloomington, IN	L 7–14		
October 9	Mississippi A&M*	Jordan Field; Bloomington, IN	W 24–0		
October 23	at Minnesota	Northrop Field; Minneapolis, MN	W 21–7	12,000	
October 30	vs. Northwestern	Washington Park; Indianapolis, IN	W 10–7	12,000	
November 13	vs. Notre Dame	Washington Park; Indianapolis, IN	L 10–13	14,000	
November 20	at Purdue	Stuart Field; West Lafayette, IN (rivalry)	W 10–7		
*Non-conference game
