= 1920 Chicago Maroons football team =

American college football season

1920 Chicago Maroons football
- Conference: Big Ten Conference
- Record: 3–4 (2–5 Big Ten)
- Head coach: Amos Alonzo Stagg (29th season)
- Home stadium: Stagg Field

1920 Big Ten Conference football standings
| | Conf. | | | | | Overall |
| Team | W | | L | | T | W | | L | | T |
|---|---|---|---|---|---|---|---|---|---|---|
| Ohio State $ | 5 | – | 0 | – | 0 | 7 | – | 1 | – | 0 |
| Wisconsin | 4 | – | 1 | – | 0 | 6 | – | 1 | – | 0 |
| Indiana | 3 | – | 1 | – | 0 | 5 | – | 2 | – | 0 |
| Illinois | 4 | – | 2 | – | 0 | 5 | – | 2 | – | 0 |
| Iowa | 3 | – | 2 | – | 0 | 5 | – | 2 | – | 0 |
| Michigan | 2 | – | 2 | – | 0 | 5 | – | 2 | – | 0 |
| Northwestern | 2 | – | 3 | – | 0 | 3 | – | 4 | – | 0 |
| Chicago | 2 | – | 4 | – | 0 | 3 | – | 4 | – | 0 |
| Purdue | 0 | – | 4 | – | 0 | 2 | – | 5 | – | 0 |
| Minnesota | 0 | – | 6 | – | 0 | 1 | – | 6 | – | 0 |
$ – Conference champion

The 1920 Chicago Maroons football team was an American football team that represented the University of Chicago during the 1920 college football season. In their 29th season under head coach Amos Alonzo Stagg, the Maroons compiled a 3–4 record, finished in eighth place in the Big Ten Conference, and outscored their opponents by a combined total of 77 to 27.

Despite being in the Western Conference (Big Ten) together since 1913, this season had the first matchup between Chicago and Ohio State.

== Schedule ==
| Date | Opponent | Site | Result | Attendance | Source |
|---|---|---|---|---|---|
| October 9 | Purdue | Stagg Field; Chicago, IL (rivalry) | W 20–0 | | |
| October 16 | Wabash* | Stagg Field; Chicago, IL | W 41–0 | | |
| October 23 | Iowa | Stagg Field; Chicago, IL | W 10–0 | | |
| October 30 | Ohio State | Stagg Field; Chicago, IL | L 6–7 | | |
| November 6 | Illinois | Stagg Field; Chicago, IL | L 0–3 | 27,545 | |
| November 13 | at Michigan | Ferry Field; Ann Arbor, MI (rivalry) | L 0–14 | 25,000 | |
| November 20 | Wisconsin | Stagg Field; Chicago, IL | L 0–3 | | |
*Non-conference game
