= 1920 Purdue Boilermakers football team =

American college football season

1920 Purdue Boilermakers football
- Conference: Big Ten Conference
- Record: 2–5 (0–4 Big Ten)
- Head coach: A. G. Scanlon (3rd season)
- Captain: Ferdinand J. Birk
- Home stadium: Stuart Field

1920 Big Ten Conference football standings
	Conf.					Overall
Team	W		L		T	W		L		T
Ohio State $	5	–	0	–	0	7	–	1	–	0
Wisconsin	4	–	1	–	0	6	–	1	–	0
Indiana	3	–	1	–	0	5	–	2	–	0
Illinois	4	–	2	–	0	5	–	2	–	0
Iowa	3	–	2	–	0	5	–	2	–	0
Michigan	2	–	2	–	0	5	–	2	–	0
Northwestern	2	–	3	–	0	3	–	4	–	0
Chicago	2	–	4	–	0	3	–	4	–	0
Purdue	0	–	4	–	0	2	–	5	–	0
Minnesota	0	–	6	–	0	1	–	6	–	0
$ – Conference champion

The 1920 Purdue Boilermakers football team was an American football team that represented Purdue University during the 1920 college football season. In their third season under head coach A. G. Scanlon, the Boilermakers compiled a 2–5 record, finished in ninth place in the Big Ten Conference with an 0–4 record against conference opponents, and were outscored by their opponents by a total of 103 to 36. Ferdinand J. Birk was the team captain.

== Schedule ==
Date	Opponent	Site	Result	Attendance	Source
October 2	DePauw*	Stuart Field; West Lafayette, IN	W 10–0		
October 9	at Chicago	Stagg Field; Chicago, IL (rivalry)	L 0–20		
October 16	at Ohio State	Ohio Field; Columbus, OH	L 0–17		
October 30	Wabash*	Stuart Field; West Lafayette, IN	W 19–14		
November 6	at Notre Dame*	Cartier Field; South Bend, IN (rivalry)	L 0–28	12,210	
November 13	at Northwestern	Northwestern Field; Evanston, IL	L 0–14	10,000	
November 20	Indiana	Stuart Field; West Lafayette, IN (Old Oaken Bucket)	L 7–10		
*Non-conference game

== Roster ==
- H. H. Bendixon, E
- Ferdinand Birk, T
- Edmund Carman, E
- W. L. Claypool, T
- Cecil Cooley, G
- Don Field, QB
- Doug Field, H
- C. E. Gulley, E
- R. C. Kerr, E
- Paul Macklin, QB
- John Meeker, RH
- Edgar Murphy, FB
- Edwin Rate, LH
- C. C. Stanwood, C
- Bill Swank, G
- Earl Wagner
- Bob Watson, FB
