= Ralph Scott (American football) =

American football player and coach (1894–1936)

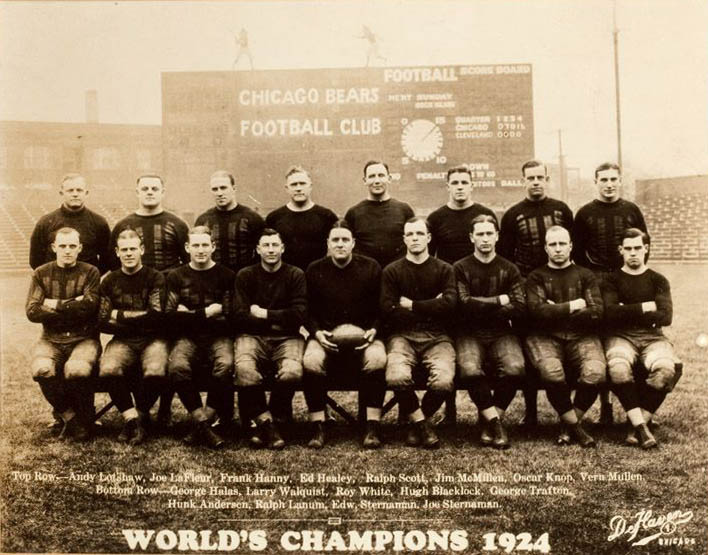
- Official Chicago Bears' team photo, where the team claimed the Championship after defeating the Cleveland Bulldogs on December 7, even putting the title "World's Champions" on the image.

Profile
- Position: Guard

Personal information
- Born: September 26, 1894; Dewey, Portage County, Wisconsin, U.S.
- Died: August 16, 1936 (aged 41); Billings, Montana, U.S.
- Listed height: 6 ft 2 in (1.88 m)
- Listed weight: 235 lb (107 kg)

Career information
- College: Wisconsin

Career history

Playing
- 1921–1925: Chicago Staleys/Bears
- 1926–1927: New York Yankees

Coaching
- 1926–1927: New York Yankees

Awards and highlights
- NFL champion (1921); Consensus All-American (1920); All-Big Ten (1920)
- Coaching profile at Pro Football Reference
- Stats at Pro Football Reference

Ralph Vernon Scott (September 26, 1894 – August 16, 1936) was an American football player and coach. He played professionally in the first American Football League (AFL) and the National Football League (NFL) for the Chicago Staleys/Bears and the New York Yankees. Scott was a member of the 1921 Chicago Staleys APFA Championship team. In 1926 C. C. Pyle, began the AFL after a dispute with the NFL over the terms of granting himself a league franchise in New York City. Pyle eventually hired Scott as a player-coach the Yankees for an undisclosed amount of money.

Prior to playing professionally, Scott played college football at the University of Wisconsin. In 1920 Scott helped the Badgers to a 6–1 record. That year, he was selected to the All-Big Ten Conference football team and was a consensus All-American.
