= Bill McCaw (American football) =

American football player (1898–1942)

Profile
- Positions: Guard, end

Personal information
- Born: February 6, 1898; St. Paul, Minnesota
- Died: April 19, 1942 (aged 44); Bloomington, Indiana
- Listed height: 6 ft 2 in (1.88 m)
- Listed weight: 194 lb (88 kg)

Career information
- High school: Bloomington (IN)
- College: Indiana

Career history
- Racine Legion (1923); Louisville Colonels (1926)

Career statistics
- Games: 7

William Glass McCaw (February 6, 1898 – April 19, 1942) was an American football player. A native of St. Paul, Minnesota, he played college football for Indiana and professional football in the National Football League (NFL) as a guard and end for the Racine Legion in 1923 and Louisville Colonels in 1926. He appeared in seven NFL games, six as a starter.

McCaw served in the United States Navy in the late 1910s before attending college; at Indiana, he was a cadet in the Reserve Officers' Training Corps. Upon graduating with a bachelor's degree in commerce, he commissioned into the Army. After his playing career, he pursued an education degree at the University of Chicago and La Crosse State Teachers College, followed by teaching physical education at Kenosha High School.

In 1933, after working at Wisconsin Power and Light Company, McCaw returned to the Army as a first lieutenant. In addition to serving on active duty, he was a company commander and area inspector for the Civilian Conservation Corps. McCaw came back to Indiana as a captain for the United States Army Reserve, where he worked in the Department of Military Science and Tactics.

On April 19, 1942, while doing a round table discussion for the WIRE radio station with Major Fenwick T. Reed and Lieutenant Bernard O'Neal, McCaw suffered a fatal heart attack. He was buried in Oshkosh, Wisconsin, next to his daughter Jane who died six years prior.
