= Robert J. Dunne =

American sportsman, coach, and judge (1899–1980)

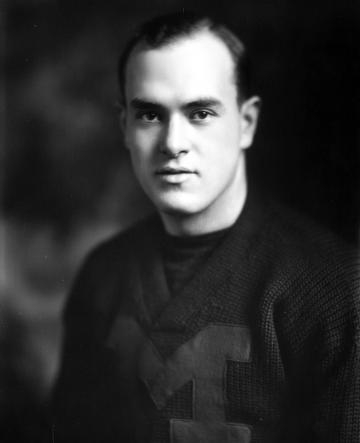
- Robert J. Dunne, 1921 team captain

Biographical details
- Born: August 29, 1899; River Forest, Illinois, U.S.
- Died: May 18, 1980 (aged 80); Winnetka, Illinois, U.S.

Playing career
- 1918–1921: Michigan
- Positions: End, guard

Coaching career (HC unless noted)
- 1923–1926: Northwestern (line)
- 1927–1930: Harvard (line)
- 1935: Chicago (line)

Accomplishments and honors

Championships
- National (1918)

Awards
- First-team All-Big Ten (1921)

Robert Jerome "Duke" Dunne (August 29, 1899 – May 18, 1980) was an American football player and coach, and state court judge in Illinois. He played for the University of Michigan from 1918 to 1921, and competed at the 1920 Summer Olympics. After graduating from Michigan in 1922, he attended law school at Northwestern University where he also served as the line coach for the university's football team from 1923 to 1925. He was also the line coach at Harvard University from 1926 to 1930 and at the University of Chicago in 1935. He was a state court judge in Illinois from 1931 to 1976 and served as the presiding judge of Chicago's probate court for his last 20 years on the bench.

== Early years ==
Dunne was born in 1899 in River Forest, Illinois. His father, Edward F. Dunne, was the mayor of Chicago from 1905 to 1907 and governor of Illinois from 1913 to 1917. While his father was serving as governor, the younger Dunne attended high school in Springfield, Illinois, where he was a star athlete in track and football.

== Michigan ==
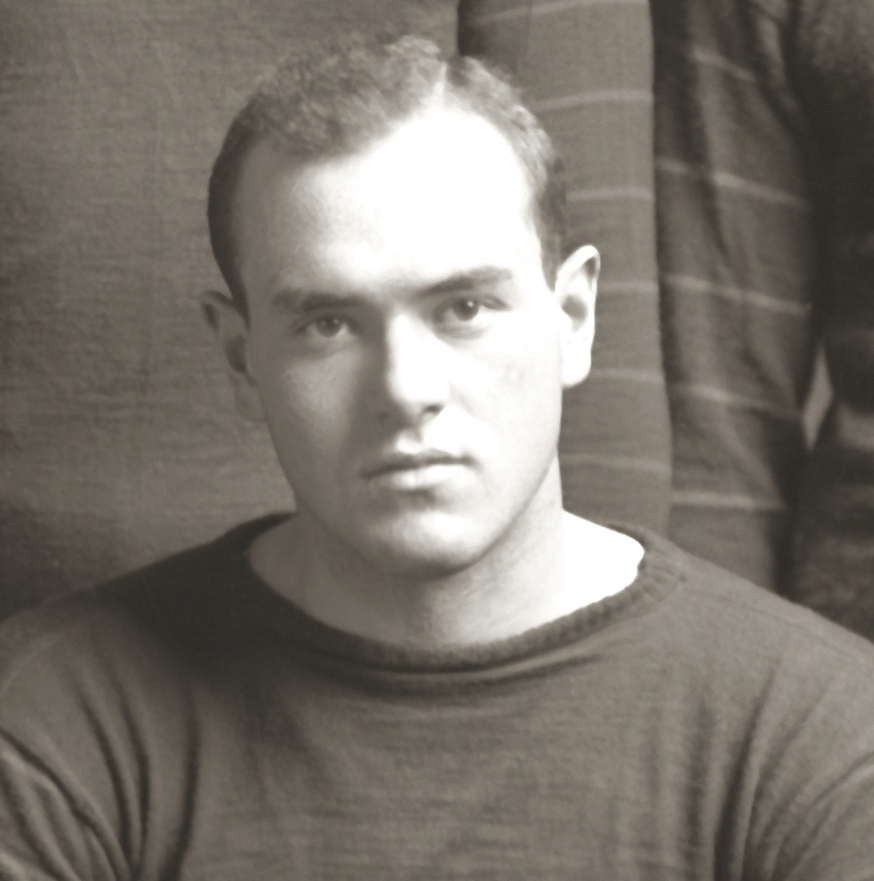
Dunne in 1919

Three of Dunne's older brothers were athletes at the University of Michigan. His brother Edward graduated from Michigan in 1909 and played first base on the Wolverines' baseball team. His brother Maurice graduated from Michigan's law school in 1917 and played for the Wolverines' baseball and football teams. His brother Dick also competed in athletics at Michigan.

Dunne announced his decision to attend the University of Michigan in May 1916. While attending Michigan, Dunne won varsity letters in three sports—four in football, two in basketball, and three in track. He played at the center position for the Michigan basketball teams and also represented the University of Michigan and the United States as a competitor in the pentathlon at the 1920 Summer Olympics in Antwerp, Belgium.

In football, Dunne started all five games for the undefeated 1918 Michigan team that was later recognized as the national championship team. As a sophomore in 1919, Dunne started six of seven games for Michigan at the tight end position. As a junior in 1920, Dunne was moved from end to guard and started all seven games as left guard for the 1920 team.

At the end of the 1920 season, Dunne was elected as the captain of the 1921 Michigan football team. He started five of seven games for the Michigan team in 1921, all at the left guard position. At the end of the 1921 season, Dunne was selected as a first-team All-American by Norman E. Brown of the Central Press Association. Dunne also earned the Big Ten Conference Medal of Honor awarded to the student at each Big Ten university with the best overall record as an athlete and student.

== Football coach ==
After graduating from Michigan, Dunne enrolled in law school at Northwestern University. While attending law school, he also served as the line coach for the school's football team from 1923 to 1926. In 1926, Dunne helped develop the Northwestern line into one of the most powerful in the West. The 1926 team tied with Michigan for the Western Conference title and held Notre Dame to one touchdown.

In January 1927, Dunne was hired by Harvard University to serve as line coach for its football team under head coach Arnold Horween. Upon his hiring, the Harvard Crimson reported that Dunne had learned the game from Fielding Yost and noted that "he will bring to Harvard a thorough knowledge of a system that has won great success in the Western Conference." Dunne coached the line at Harvard for five years, announcing his retirement from football in December 1930.

In May 1935, Dunne, then a sitting judge on the Chicago Municipal Court, was appointed line coach for the University of Chicago football team. He was assigned to develop the team's guards and tackles.

== Judicial career ==
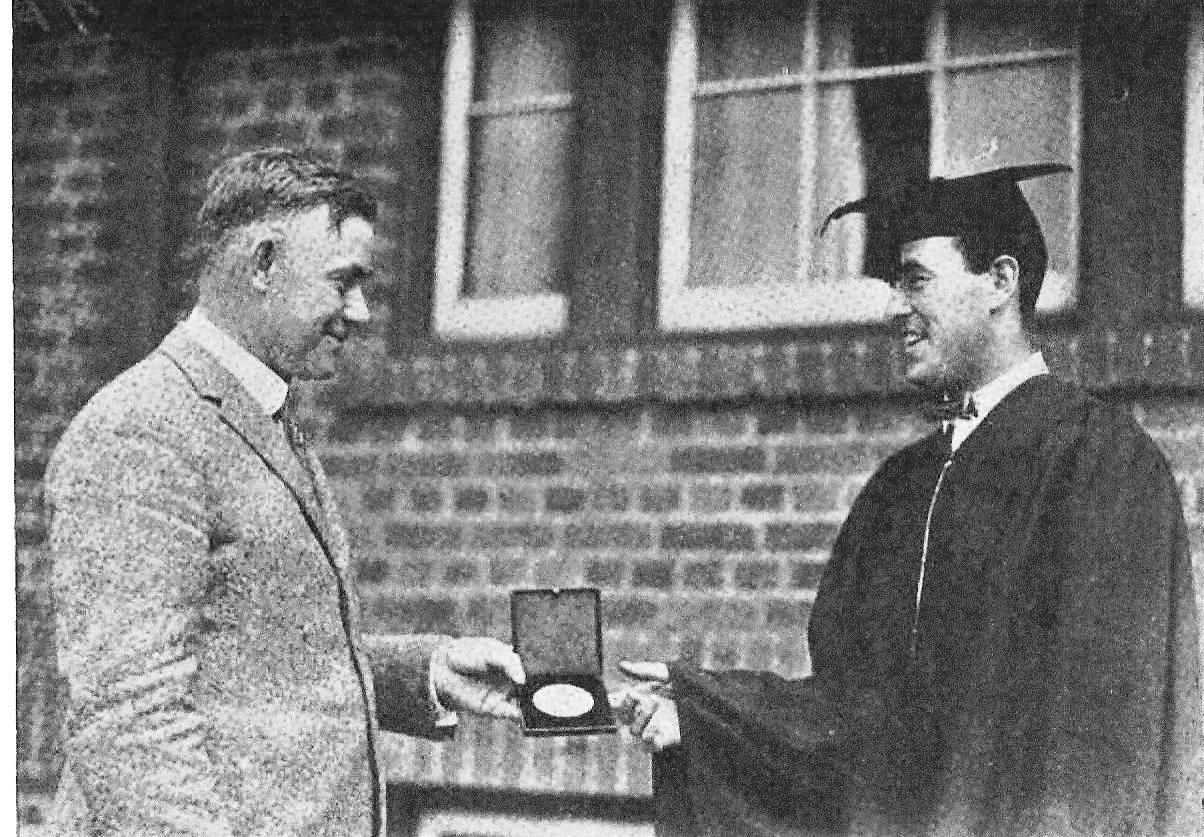
Dunne received Big Ten medal from Coach Yost, June 1922.

After leaving Harvard in 1930, Dunne returned to Chicago and entered the practice of law. In 1932, he was elected as a municipal court judge in Chicago. In 1936, he was elected as a judge of the Illinois Circuit Courts (he was elected in the special election held November 3, 1936 to fill the vacancy left on the Circuit Court of Cook County by the resignation of Francis S. Wilson). Dunne spent his initial term as a Circuit Court judge working in the criminal courts. He was criticized in 1938 by the state's attorney's office after he placed 137 defendants on probation in an 18-month period. Two of the cases which aroused the prosecutor's criticism of Dunne were the case of a 19-year-old man convicted of manslaughter and a former official of Niles, Illinois convicted of embezzlement. Dunne defended his actions, stating that he believed that leniency would reclaim the defendants for society more surely than a prison sentence. When Dunne ran for re-election in 1939, the bar association committee on candidates endorsed his renomination by a vote of 1,558 to 226 with 88.94% rating him as fit. Dunne was re-elected and was assigned as the presiding judge in Juvenile Court in 1947. In 1948, Dunne described the position in the Juvenile Court as "the most heartbreaking job he has ever had." He also called it "the most futile job he has known" in criticizing the lack of funding and resources to carry out the vital function.

Dunne spent the last 20 years of his judicial career as the presiding probate judge in Chicago. In that position, he presided over lawsuits involving the estates of many of Illinois' most famous personalities. Among the noted cases in which Dunne presided are the following:

- In 1959, Dunne presided over the probate of the estate of Grace Comiskey and a dispute over control of the Chicago White Sox between siblings Dorothy Comiskey Rigney and Charles Comiskey. Dunne rejected a petition by Charles Comiskey to block his sister's sale of a 54% interest in the club to Bill Veeck for $2.7 million.
- Also in 1959, Dunne oversaw the probate of the estate of Ada Wrigley, the widow of William Wrigley Jr., owner of the Chicago Cubs and the William Wrigley Jr. Company. The combined estates were valued at more than $40 million.
- In 1960, Dunne was the presiding judge in a lawsuit concerning efforts of Charles O. Finley to purchase a 52% ownership interest in the Kansas City Athletics baseball team from the estate of Arnold Johnson. Dunne approved the sale despite concerns that Finley might move the club out of Kansas City.
- In 1967, Dunne presided over the probate of the estate of Abe Saperstein, owner of the Harlem Globetrotters. Dunne approved the estate's sale of the Globetrotters to a syndicate led by Potter Palmer, scion of a wealthy Chicago family.

Dunne retired from the bench in 1976.

== Later years and death ==
In July 1969, Dunne received a Distinguished American Award from the Chicago chapter of the National Football Foundation and Hall of Fame for carrying the lessons of football into a life of service to the community.

After retiring from the bench in 1976, Dunne became associate counsel with the law firm of McBride, Baker, Wienke, and Schlosser. Dunne died in May 1980 at his home in Winnetka, Illinois. He was 80 years old at the time of his death and was survived by his wife, Margaret, three sons, Robert Jr., Dennis, and Albert Pyott, and a daughter, Carol D. Baranko.
