= Ewald O. Stiehm =

American sports coach (1886–1923)

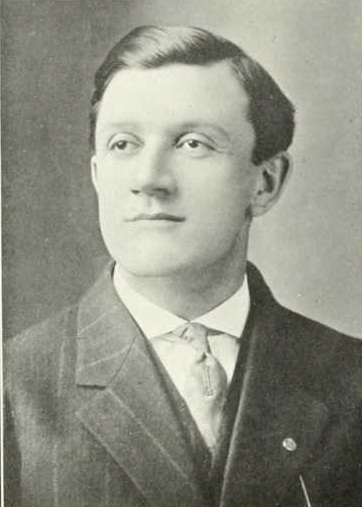

Biographical details
- Born: April 9, 1886; Johnson Creek, Wisconsin, U.S.
- Died: August 18, 1923 (aged 37); Bloomington, Indiana, U.S.

Playing career

Football
- 1906–1908: Wisconsin
- Position: Center

Coaching career (HC unless noted)

Football
- 1910: Ripon
- 1911–1915: Nebraska
- 1916–1921: Indiana

Basketball
- 1910–1911: Ripon
- 1911–1915: Nebraska
- 1919–1920: Indiana

Administrative career (AD unless noted)
- 1916–1922: Indiana

Head coaching record
- Overall: 59–23–4 (football); 69–22 (basketball)

Accomplishments and honors

Championships
- Football; 5 MVIAA (1911–1915); Basketball; 3 MVIAA (1912–1914)

Ewald O. "Jumbo" Stiehm (April 9, 1886 – August 18, 1923) was an American football player, coach of football and basketball, and college athletics administrator. He served as the head football coach at Ripon College in Ripon, Wisconsin (1910), the University of Nebraska–Lincoln (1911–1915), and Indiana University (1916–1921), compiling a career college football record of 59–23–4. Stiehm was also the head basketball coach at Nebraska from 1911 to 1915 and at Indiana from 1919 to 1920, tallying a career mark of 69–22.

== Career ==
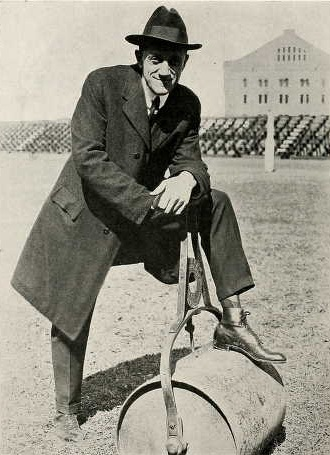
The "Stiehm" Roller, 1920

Stiehm began his coaching career at Ripon College in 1910, where he led the Red Hawks football team to a 4–3 record. From 1911 to 1915, he coached football at Nebraska, and compiled a 35–2–3 record. From 1913 to 1915, his teams went undefeated seasons. In the history of the Nebraska Cornhuskers football program, Stiehm has the highest winning percentage (.913) of anyone who coached more than two games.

From 1916 to 1921, he coached the Indiana Hoosiers football team and compiled a 20–18–1 record. As Indiana University's athletic director in 1917, Stiehm advocated for the Big Nine, a precursor to the Big Ten conference, to maintain athletics programs and not shut down due to World War enlistments. As head coach for the 1919-20 Indiana Hoosier's men's basketball team, he compiled an overall 13–8 record and finished 4th in conference play. Stiehm signed a 5-year contract in February 1920 to be IU's athletic director.

== Death ==
Stiehm died on August 18, 1923, in Bloomington, Indiana, at the age of 37 after an 11-month bout with stomach cancer.

== Head coaching record ==
=== Football ===
Year	Team	Overall	Conference	Standing	Bowl/playoffs
Ripon Crimson (Independent) (1910)
1910	Ripon	4–3			
Ripon:		4–3			
Nebraska Cornhuskers (Missouri Valley Intercollegiate Athletic Association) (1911–1915)
1911	Nebraska	5–1–2	2–0–1	T–1st	
1912	Nebraska	7–1	2–0	T–1st	
1913	Nebraska	8–0	3–0	T–1st	
1914	Nebraska	7–0–1	3–0	1st	
1915	Nebraska	8–0	4–0	1st	
Nebraska:		35–2–3	14–0–1		
Indiana Hoosiers (Big Ten Conference) (1916–1921)
1916	Indiana	2–4–1	0–3–1	7th	
1917	Indiana	5–2	1–2	7th	
1918	Indiana	2–2	0–0		
1919	Indiana	3–4	0–2	T–9th	
1920	Indiana	5–2	3–1	3rd	
1921	Indiana	3–4	1–2	7th	
Indiana:		20–18–1	5–10–1		
Total:		59–23–4			
National championship Conference title Conference division title or championship game berth

=== Basketball ===
Record table
Season	Team	Overall	Conference	Standing	Postseason
Nebraska Cornhuskers (Missouri Valley Intercollegiate Athletic Association) (1911–1915)
1911–12	Nebraska	14–1	8–0	1st (North)	
1912–13	Nebraska	16–2	10–0	1st (North)	
1913–14	Nebraska	15–3	7–0	1st (North)	
1914–15	Nebraska	10–8	8–4	2nd	
Nebraska:		55–14	33–4		
Indiana Hoosers (Big Ten Conference) (1919–1920)
1919–20	Indiana	13–8	6–4	4th	
Indiana:		13–8	6–4		
Total:		68–22			
National champion Postseason invitational champion Conference regular season champion Conference regular season and conference tournament champion Division regular season champion Division regular season and conference tournament champion Conference tournament champion
