= Al Elliott =

American baseball and football player (1894–1975)

Bob Allen
- Center fielder
- Born: Alvah Charles Elliott; October 13, 1894; Muscoda, Wisconsin, U.S.
- Died: December 18, 1975 (aged 81); Naperville, Illinois, U.S.
- Batted: Right Threw: Right

MLB debut
- August 20, 1919, for the Philadelphia Athletics

Last MLB appearance
- September 6, 1919, for the Philadelphia Athletics

Career statistics
- Batting average: .136
- Hits: 3
- Runs: 3
- Stats at Baseball Reference

Teams
- Philadelphia Athletics (1919)

Bob Allen / Al Elliott
Profile
- Position: Halfback

Personal information
- Listed height: 5 ft 9 in (1.75 m)
- Listed weight: 175 lb (79 kg)

Career information
- College: Wisconsin

Career history
- Racine Legion (1922–1924)

Awards and highlights
- First-team All-Big Ten (1921)

Career statistics
- Rushing TD's: 3
- Receiving TD's: 2

Robert Allen (born Alvah Charles Elliott; October 13, 1894 – December 18, 1975), also known as "Al Elliott," was an American professional baseball and professional football player. Allen's baseball career spanned one season in both Major League Baseball and minor league baseball. Allen played the center field position. Over his career, he played for the Class-A Hartford Senators in the minor leagues and the Philadelphia Athletics in the majors. Allen has a major league career batting average of .136 with three hits in 22 at-bats. He played a total of nine games in the majors. In the minors, he batted .271 in 63 games.

During his football career, he played the halfback position. He played with the Racine Legion in the National Football League from 1922 to 1924. He played at total of 28 games, starting in 23 of them. He scored a total of five touchdowns in his three-year career. He attended the University of Wisconsin–Madison for college.

== Amateur career ==
Allen attended college at the University of Wisconsin–Madison from 1914 to 1919.

== Professional career ==
=== Baseball ===
Allen began to play professional baseball in 1919. He started his career with the minor league Class-A Hartford Senators of the Eastern League. With the Senators, Allen batted .271 with 61 hits, seven doubles, 11 triples and two home runs in 63 games played. On defense, Allen played all 63 of hit games in the outfield, committing two errors in 145 total chances.

Allen made his debut in Major League Baseball on August 20, 1919, as a member of the Philadelphia Athletics. He played six games with the Athletics that season, his lat coming on September 6. In nine games, Allen batted .136 with three runs, three hits, one double, three walks and seven strikeouts. Allen played six games in the outfield, committing one error in nine chances. Allen would not play professional baseball after the 1919 season.

=== American football ===
He began his professional American football career in 1922. In the football circuit, he was known as "ACE Elliott", derived from his birth name Alvah Charles Elliott. Elliott started his career with the National Football League franchise Racine Legion, who represented Racine, Wisconsin. In 1922, Elliott played in 11 games (nine starts) and scored two rushing touchdowns. The next season, 1923, Elliott scored two receiving touchdowns in 10 games, eight starts. During his final season, 1924, Elliott scored one rushing touchdown and made one field goal.

== Personal ==
Alvah Charles Elliott was born on October 13, 1894, in Muscoda, Wisconsin. He died on December 18, 1975, in Naperville, Illinois at the age of 81. He was buried at Bronswood Cemetery in Oak Brook, Illinois.
