= Gaylord Stinchcomb =

American football player and coach (1895–1973)

Gaylord 'Pete' Stinchcomb

No. 8, 4
- Position: Back

Personal information
- Born: June 24, 1895; Sycamore, Ohio, U.S.
- Died: August 24, 1973 (aged 78); Findlay, Ohio, U.S.
- Listed height: 5 ft 8 in (1.73 m)
- Listed weight: 157 lb (71 kg)

Career information
- High school: Fostoria
- College: Ohio State (1917, 1919–1920)

Career history

Playing
- Chicago Staleys / Bears (1921–1922); Cleveland Indians (1923); Columbus Tigers (1923); Louisville Colonels (1926)

Coaching
- Columbus Tigers (1923) Head coach; Ohio State (1935) Halfbacks coach

Awards and highlights
- NFL champion (1921); 2× First-team All-Pro (1921, 1922); Second-team All-Pro (1923); Consensus All-American (1920); 2× First-team All-Big Ten (1919, 1920)

Career statistics
- Games played: 34
- Games started: 18
- Rushing touchdowns: 7
- Stats at Pro Football Reference
- Coaching profile at Pro Football Reference
- College Football Hall of Fame

Gaylord Roscoe "Pete" Stinchcomb (June 24, 1895 – August 24, 1973) was an American football player. He played quarterback and halfback at Ohio State University where he was selected as a consensus All-American in 1920. He later played professional football as a back for the Chicago Bears (1921–1922), Columbus Tigers (1923), Cleveland Indians (1923), and Louisville Colonels (1926). He was inducted into the College Football Hall of Fame in 1973.

== Biography ==
Stinchcomb was a native of Sycamore, Ohio. He played high school football for Fostoria High School in Fostoria, Ohio, and was named an All-Ohio halfback while playing on an undefeated football team.

=== College ===
Stinchcomb enrolled at Ohio State University in 1916. He played for the Buckeyes as a quarterback and halfback in 1917, 1919 and 1920. Stinchcomb's biography at the College Football Hall of Fame describes him as follows: "Although a lightweight at 165 pounds, Stinchcomb was a halfback blitz, quick and shifty as he made his way through enemy defenses."

As a sophomore in 1917, Stinchcomb was selected as an All-Big Ten Conference player at the quarterback position. Though All-American Chic Harley was the veteran star of the 1917 Buckeyes team, Stinchcomb's play won him praise as a co-star of the Ohio State backfield. One newspaper wrote as follows about Stinchcomb's performance in 1917:

Stinchcomb a Star. On the campus at Ohio State they call him 'Pete,' and although the stellar performance against Northwestern was his 'curtain' affair they have learned to mention him in the same breath with 'Chic' Harley. Last season when Stinchcomb was running through the varsity as a member of the freshman eleven Ohio fans looked a year ahead and longed to see Harley and Stinchcomb paired off as halves on the same team. Today, that situation has come pass, and with what effect the season's record shows.

At the end of the 1917 season, one newspaper wrote: "Harley and his teammate, Stinchcomb, of Ohio State, outstepped their rivals and made the greatest pair of backs ever seen in the Western Conference."

In April 1918, following the entry of the United States into World War I, Stinchcomb enlisted in the U.S. Navy and missed the 1918 football season. He played for the Cleveland Naval Reserve football team during the 1918 season. In an 83–0 win over Cornell, he ran 100 yards for a touchdown. In a 14–6 win over Camp Grant, Stinchcomb was the Navy's star, kicking two extra points and returning a punt 65 yards for a touchdown. And at the end of the 1918 season, Stinchcomb scored seven points (a touchdown and an extra point) as the Cleveland Naval Reserve team defeated the University of Pittsburgh football team, 10–9. In a profile of Stinchcomb published in November 1918, one writer observed:

The reason for such optimistic predictions is the showing Stlnchcomb has made this season in the 'unofficial' football season all grid fans have enjoyed. As backfleld man for the Cleveland Naval Reserve team -- in which branch of the service Stinchcomb has been serving -- 'Pete' has romped around opposing ends -- plunged through their lines and carried his team to the fore ranks of military and naval football ratings.

In late December 1918, Stinchcomb, described as "the star line-plunger on the Cleveland Naval Reserve eleven," announced his plan to return to Ohio State in 1919. After the war, Stinchcomb returned to Ohio State and played for the Buckeyes football team in 1919 and 1920. He also founded the Student Bookstore at Ohio State in 1920.

In 1919, he played for the first Ohio State football team to defeat the University of Michigan. Stinchcomb and fellow backfield star Chic Harley were the stars in the Buckeyes' first victory over the Wolverines. At the end of the 1919 season, Stinchcomb was selected as a first-team All-Western quarterback.

With Harley's graduation, Stinchcomb was the star of Ohio State's 1920 football team. The 1920 group led by Stinchcomb became Ohio State's first undefeated football team, and at the end of the season Stinchcomb was selected as a first-team All-American. Ohio State coach John Wilce later recalled the efficiency of the two stars of his 1920 team: "'Workmen to Stinchcomb' was a phrase almost as common in the west as the famous 'Tinker to Evers to Chance.' Hoge Workman at quarter and Pete Stinchcomb at right half played every phase of footpall expertly but they had developed the aerial game to the last degree of efficiency. ... Stinchcomb was perhaps the outstanding star of the squad. The critics unanimously picked him for all-American halfback."

While traveling to Pasadena, California in December 1920 to play in the 1921 Rose Bowl, Stinchcomb announced that he would marry Anne Jane Summers of Columbus, Ohio. The two remained married for more than 50 years until Stinchcomb's death in 1973. Stinchcomb would rush for 82 yards in the 28-0 blowout loss.

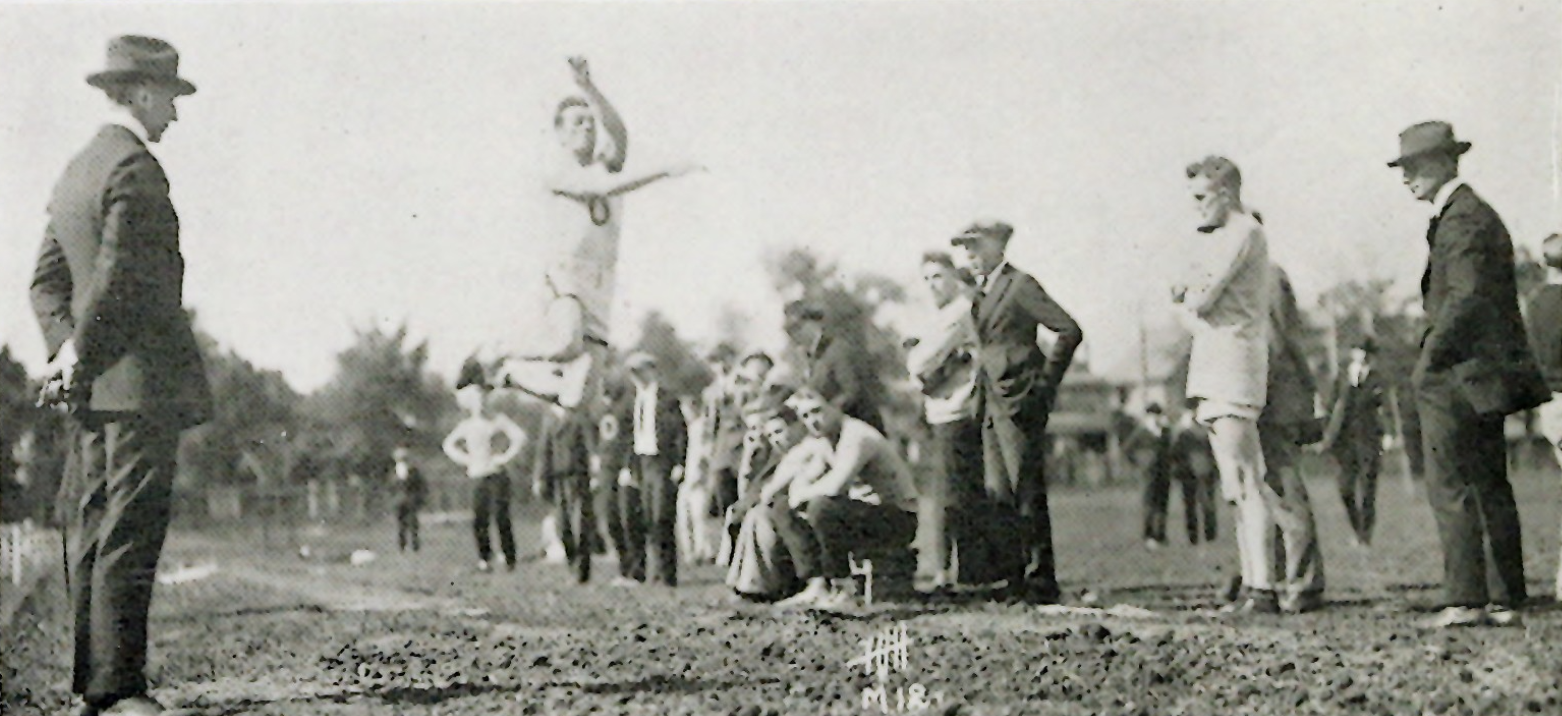
Stinchcomb jumps 23 ft 1 (7.04 m) in to win a duel meet vs Michigan and set an Ohio Field record (1921)

Stinchcomb also competed for Ohio State in baseball and track and field. As a senior, he won the 1921 NCAA championship in the broad jump.

=== Professional ===
Stinchcomb played several years of professional football. He played two years for George Halas's Chicago Bears (1921–1922) and also played some for the Columbus Tigers (1923), the Cleveland Indians (1923), and the Louisville Colonels (1926). He was selected as a first-team All-Pro in 1921 and 1922 and a second-team All-Pro in 1923.

=== Coaching ===
Stinchcomb returned to Ohio State as a backfield coach in 1935.

=== Later life ===
After retiring from football, Stinchcomb served as president of Linworth Homes Inc. of Findlay, Ohio and Uhrichsville, Ohio, and as president of Eagle Creek Utility Co. of Findlay. Stinchcomb and his wife, Anne Jane, lived in Upper Arlington, Ohio for many years, but moved to Findlay, Ohio in 1968 when he became president of Linworth Homes.

In 1973, Stinchcomb was elected to the College Football Hall of Fame, but he died at age 78 before the induction ceremony was conducted. There is a street named after him nearby the Ohio State campus.
