= 1920 Michigan Wolverines football team =

American college football season

1920 Michigan Wolverines football
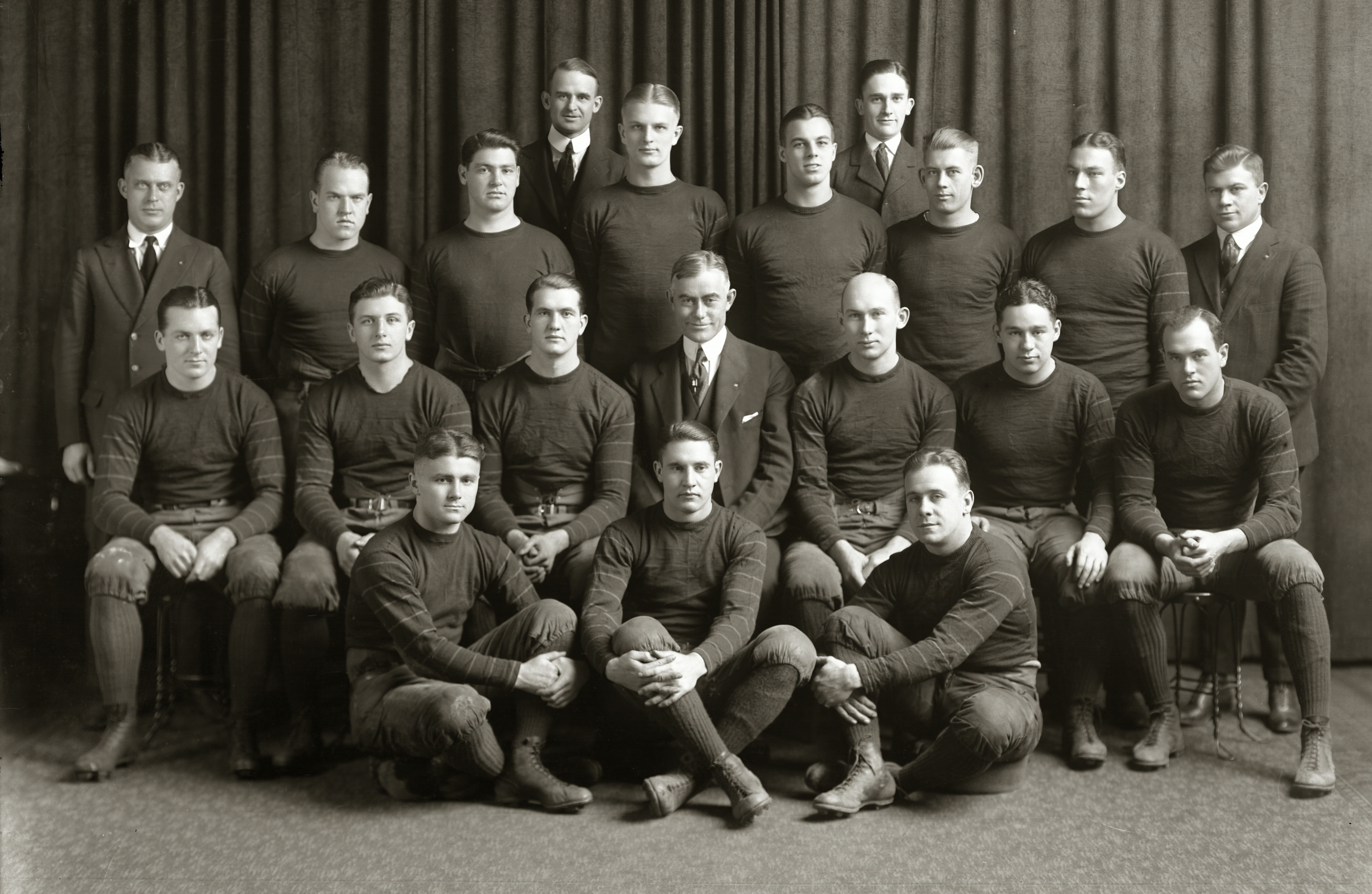
- Conference: Big Ten Conference
- Record: 5–2 (2–2 Big Ten)
- Head coach: Fielding H. Yost (20th season)
- Captain: Angus Goetz
- Home stadium: Ferry Field

Uniform
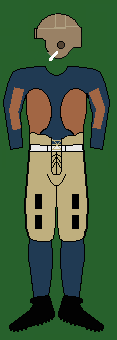

1920 Big Ten Conference football standings
	Conf.					Overall
Team	W		L		T	W		L		T
Ohio State $	5	–	0	–	0	7	–	1	–	0
Wisconsin	4	–	1	–	0	6	–	1	–	0
Indiana	3	–	1	–	0	5	–	2	–	0
Illinois	4	–	2	–	0	5	–	2	–	0
Iowa	3	–	2	–	0	5	–	2	–	0
Michigan	2	–	2	–	0	5	–	2	–	0
Northwestern	2	–	3	–	0	3	–	4	–	0
Chicago	2	–	4	–	0	3	–	4	–	0
Purdue	0	–	4	–	0	2	–	5	–	0
Minnesota	0	–	6	–	0	1	–	6	–	0
$ – Conference champion

The 1920 Michigan Wolverines football team was an American football team that represented the University of Michigan in the Big Ten Conference during the 1920 college football season. In its 20th season under head coach Fielding H. Yost, the team compiled a 5–2 record (2–2 against conference opponents), finished sixth in the Big Ten, and outscored opponents by a total of 121 to 21.

Left tackle Angus Goetz was the team captain. Other notable players included halfbacks Frank Steketee and Eddie Usher, right tackle Tad Wieman, left end Franklin Cappon, right end Paul G. Goebel, left guard Robert J. Dunne, and center Ernie Vick.

== Schedule ==
Date	Opponent	Site	Result	Attendance	Source
October 9	Case*	Ferry Field; Ann Arbor, MI	W 35–0	10,000	
October 16	Michigan Agricultural*	Ferry Field; Ann Arbor, MI (rivalry)	W 35–0	20,000	
October 23	Illinois	Ferry Field; Ann Arbor, MI (rivalry)	L 6–7	27,655–30,000	
October 30	Tulane*	Ferry Field; Ann Arbor, MI	W 21–0	13,000	
November 6	at Ohio State	Ohio Field; Columbus, OH (rivalry)	L 7–14	20,000	
November 13	Chicago^{†}	Ferry Field; Ann Arbor, MI (rivalry)	W 14–0	25,000	
November 20	at Minnesota	Northrop Field; Minneapolis, MN (Little Brown Jug)	W 3–0	25,000	
*Non-conference game; ^{†}Homecoming

== Players ==
=== Varsity letter winners ===
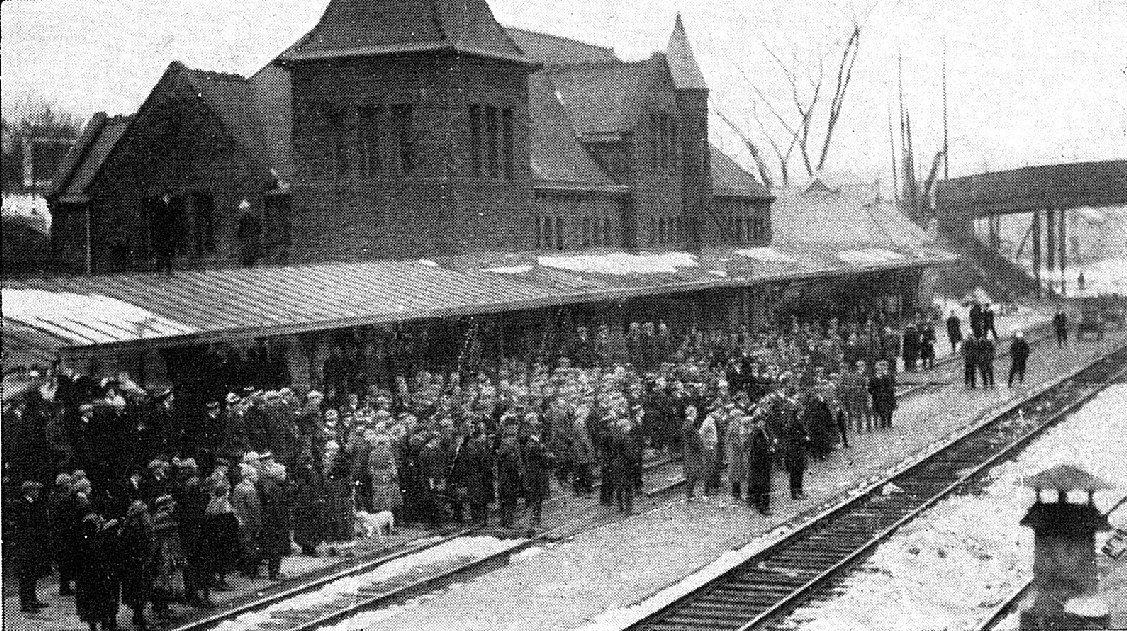
Crowd at Ann Arbor train station awaits return of the Little Brown Jug, November 1920

The following 16 players received their "M" letter for their play on the 1920 football team.

- Ted Bank, Flint, Michigan - started 3 games at quarterback
- Franklin Cappon, Holland, Michigan - started 7 games at left end
- Abe Cohn, Spokane, Washington - started 1 game at left halfback
- John Dunn, Ann Arbor, Michigan - started 4 games at quarterback
- Robert J. Dunne, Chicago, Illinois - started 7 games at left guard
- Paul G. Goebel, Grand Rapids, Michigan - started 7 games at right end
- Angus Goetz, Sault Ste. Marie, Michigan - started 7 games at left tackle
- James Edwards Johns, Lansing, Michigan - started 2 games at right tackle
- Viggo O. Nelson, Ann Arbor, Michigan - started 7 games at fullback
- John Perrin, Escanaba, Michigan - started 2 games at right halfback
- Frank Steketee, Grand Rapids, Michigan - started 3 games at right halfback, 1 game at left halfback
- Eddie Usher, Toledo, Ohio - started 6 games at left halfback, 1 game at right halfback
- William J. Van Orden, Ann Arbor, Michigan - guard (not listed as starter in any games)
- Ernie Vick, Toledo, Ohio - started 7 games at center
- Tad Wieman, Los Angeles, California - started 5 games at right tackle
- Hugh E. Wilson, Grand Rapids, Michigan - started 6 games at right guard

=== aMa letter winners ===
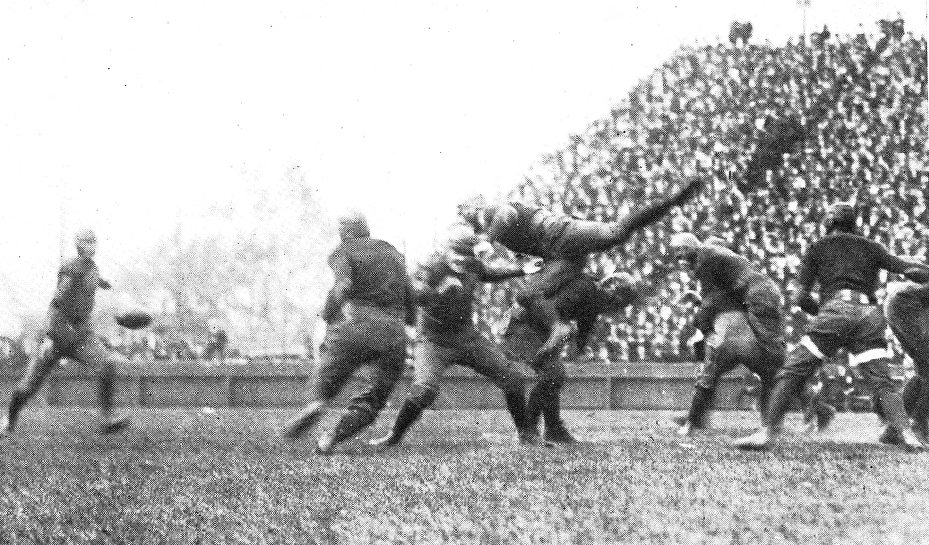
Team captain Angus Goetz leaps in effort to block punt by Hellstrom of Illinois

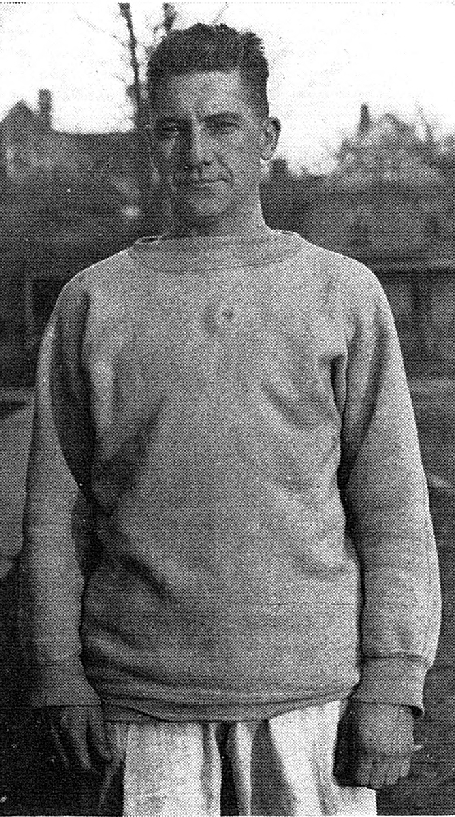
Derrill Pratt was not only part of the coaching staff but a Major League Baseball player

The following 13 players were awarded "aMa" letters for their work as backups on the 1920 team:

- Grenville Andrews, St. Louis, Missouri - halfback
- Allen R. Bailey, Cedar Falls, Iowa - halfback
- William Fortune, Springfield, Illinois - guard
- George M. Gilmore, Ann Arbor, Michigan - tackle
- Louis C. Lehman, Newark, New Jersey - end
- Charles C. Kreis, Detroit, Michigan
- Meyer Paper, St. Paul, Minnesota - halfback
- Charles C. Petro, Elyria, Ohio - guard
- George E. Planck, Lansing, Michigan - guard
- Richard H. Rowland, Buffalo, New York - end
- John G. Searle, Evanston, Illinois - quarterback
- Charles E. Trout, Toledo, Ohio
- Horace Wachter, Toledo, Ohio - guard

== Awards and honors ==
- Captain: Angus Goetz
- All-Americans: Angus Goetz (Walter Camp, 2nd team); Tad Wieman (Lawrence Perry, 2nd team)
- All-Western: Ernie Vick, Frank Steketee (Eckersall, 1st team), Angus Goetz (Eckersall, 2nd team), Franklin Cappon (Eckersall, 2nd team)

== Coaching staff ==
- Head coach: Fielding H. Yost
- Assistant coaches: Prentiss Douglass, A. J. Sturzenegger, Robert Watson, Edwin Mather, Derril Pratt
- Trainer: Archie Hahn, William Fallon
- Manager: Robert E. McKean
