= Jack Crangle =

American football player and coach (1899–1944)

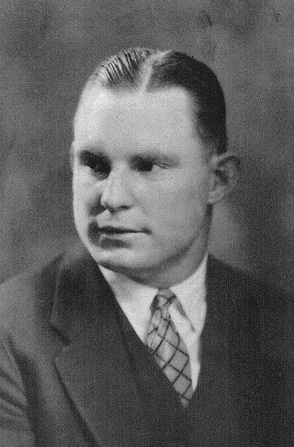
- Crangle from The Savitar, 1930

Biographical details
- Born: June 8, 1899; Onarga, Illinois, U.S.
- Died: August 31, 1944 (aged 45); Independence, Missouri, U.S.

Playing career

Football
- 1919–1921: Illinois
- 1923: Chicago Cardinals
- Position: Fullback

Coaching career (HC unless noted)

Football
- 1922–1923: St. Viator
- 1924: Arkansas (line)
- 1925–?: Missouri (assistant)
- 1942: Saint Louis (line)

Basketball
- ?: St. Viator

Baseball
- 1926–1932: Missouri

Head coaching record
- Overall: 8–7–3 (football); 54–55 (baseball)

Accomplishments and honors

Championships
- National (1919)

Awards
- Second-team All-American (1920); First-team All-Big Ten (1920)

Walter Francis "Jack" Crangle (June 8, 1899 – August 31, 1944) was an American football fullback. He played college football for the University of Illinois and was selected as an All-American in 1920 and 1921. He was a member of Illinois' Big Ten Conference championship teams in 1919 and 1920. He played one season of professional football for the Chicago Cardinals of the National Football League. He was selected as a second-team All-NFL player by Collyers Eye Magazine in 1923. He also played minor league baseball in 1924 for Elgin in the Chicago League. Crangle later became a football and basketball coach at St. Viator College, head baseball coach and assistant football coach under Gwinn Henry at the University of Missouri and assistant football coach at St. Louis University. In his later years, he worked for the Aluminum Company of America and operated a filling station north of Columbia, Missouri. Crangle died at his home in Independence, Missouri at age 45 in 1944. Following Crangle's death in 1944, Jack Ryan of the Chicago Daily News wrote that Crangle "rates high among the many good backs Bob Zuppke developed at the state university." Howard Millard of the Decatur Review wrote: "It doesn't seem possible that Jack Crangle, the big, easy going, likeable fellow, probably the greatest fullback in all Illinois University history, is dead."

== Head coaching record ==
=== Football ===
Year	Team	Overall	Conference	Standing	Bowl/playoffs
St. Viator (Illinois Intercollegiate Athletic Conference) (1922–1923)
1922	St. Viator	3–4–1	0–1		
1923	St. Viator	5–3–2	1–2	16th	
St. Viator:		8–7–3	1–3		
Total:		8–7–3			

== See also ==
- 1920 College Football All-America Team
- 1921 College Football All-America Team
