= Festus Tierney =

American football player (1899–1973)

Profile
- Position: Guard

Personal information
- Born: July 1, 1899; Saint Paul, Minnesota, U.S.
- Died: August 14, 1973 (aged 74); Minneapolis, Minnesota, U.S.
- Listed height: 6 ft 1 in (1.85 m)
- Listed weight: 198 lb (90 kg)

Career information
- College: Minnesota

Career history
- Hammond Pros (1922); Toledo Maroons (1922); Minneapolis Marines (1923–1924); Milwaukee Badgers (1925)

Career statistics
- Games played: 25
- Stats at Pro Football Reference

Festus Patrick Tierney (July 1, 1899 – August 14, 1973) was a guard in the National Football League (NFL). Tierney split the 1922 NFL season between the Hammond Pros and the Toledo Maroons before playing the next two season with the Minneapolis Marines. He played his final season with the Milwaukee Badgers.
