= Angus Goetz =

American football player (1897–1977)

Gus Goetz
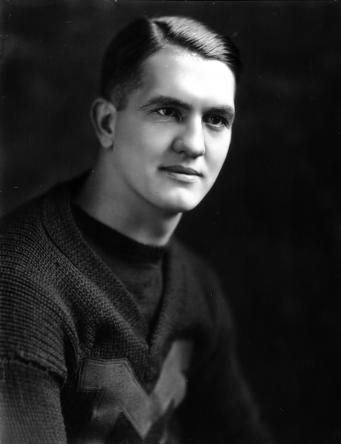
- Angus Goetz, 1920

No. 14
- Positions: End, tackle

Personal information
- Born: July 6, 1897; DeTour, Michigan, U.S.
- Died: July 24, 1977 (aged 80); Grosse Pointe, Michigan, U.S.
- Listed height: 6 ft 3 in (1.91 m)
- Listed weight: 198 lb (90 kg)

Career information
- High school: Sault Ste. Marie (MI)
- College: Michigan

Career history
- Buffalo All-Americans (1922); Columbus Tigers (1923)

Awards and highlights
- National champion (1918); Second-team All-American (1920); Third-team All-American (1918); First-team All-Big Ten (1920)

Career statistics
- Games played: 9
- Games started: 9
- Stats at Pro Football Reference

Angus Gerald "Gus" Goetz (July 6, 1897 – July 24, 1977) was an American football player who played four years with the Michigan Wolverines from 1917 to 1920. He also played professional football for the Buffalo All-Americans (1922) and the Columbus Tigers (1923).

== College career ==
A native of Sault Ste. Marie, Michigan, Goetz graduated from Sault Area High School in 1915 and went on to study medicine and play football at the University of Michigan. Goetz played varsity football at Michigan for four years from 1917 to 1920. He started nine games as a left end in his freshman year and moved to the left tackle position in his sophomore, junior and senior years.

Goetz was a star for at tackle on the undefeated 1918 Michigan Wolverines football team. In a season shortened to five games due to the deadly 1918 flu epidemic and war-related travel restrictions, the Wolverines were 5–0 and national champions. They shut out four of their opponents and outscored their opponents 96–6. In Michigan's first game against the University of Chicago in 13 years, Goetz scored a touchdown in the Wolverines' 13–0 victory. Goetz also had the key play in a 14–0 shutout over Ohio State. The game was scoreless when Ohio State attempted to punt out of its end zone, and Goetz broke through and blocked the punt which was recovered for a touchdown. He was selected as an All-Western Conference tackle in 1918. After an outstanding season in 1918, Goetz was elected as Michigan's captain for the 1919 season. He was elected captain for a second time for the 1920 season, becoming one of only three two-time Michigan football captain between 1893 and 1984, the others being Kirk Lewis (1975, 1976) and Robert Thompson (1981, 1982).

In 1920, Goetz was described as "the mainstay of the Wolverine line and a player of exceptional ability." In November 1920, Edward Speyer, football writer for the Detroit News wrote: "There is one star on the team, and that is Goetz, a great player. ... It is a line from poor to good, with one great spot where Goetz stood ..." He was selected in 1920 as a first-team All-Western Conference player, and a second-team All-American by Walter Camp.

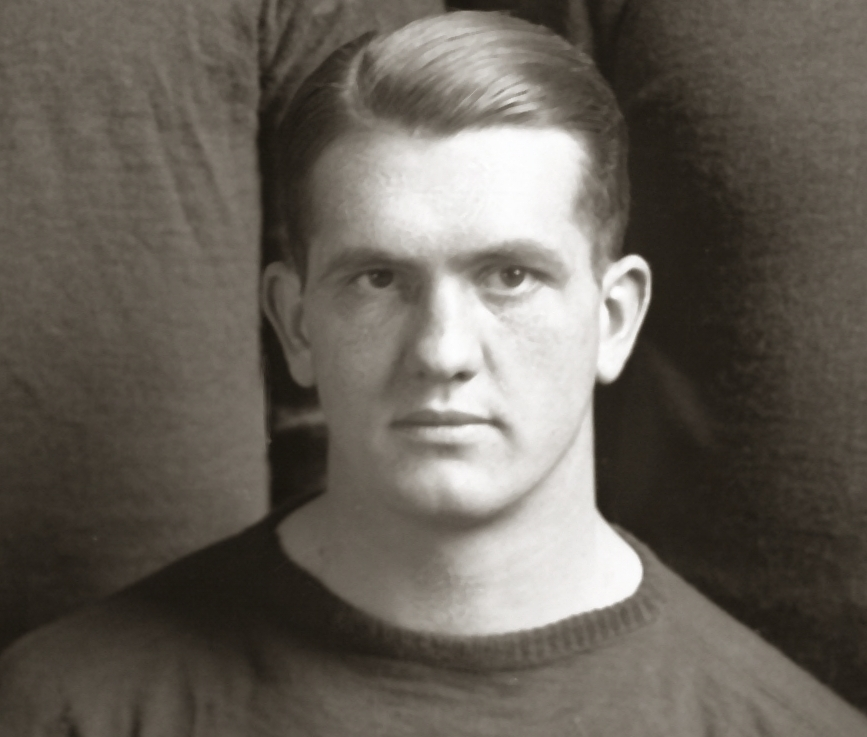
Goetz cropped from 1919 team photo

Goetz was also elected president of the University of Michigan Student Council in 1920 and attended the Midwest Student Conference as a Michigan delegate in April 1922.

When he finished his college football career at Michigan, he had the distinction of having "played more minutes for Michigan than any other player in the university's history." In a 1920 profile of Goetz, the Associated Press noted: "Perhaps his most notable distinction lies in the fact that no time has been taken out for him during any game in the four years that he has been in the Michigan machine."

While continuing his medical school studies at Michigan, Goetz also worked as an assistant line coach under coach Fielding H. Yost during the 1921 football season.

== Professional career ==
In 1922, Goetz was offered $240 a game for 10 professional football games. Goetz asked his former coach Fielding H. Yost what to do, and Yost told him he would lose his "M" if he played professional football. According to Yost, Goetz tore up the contract, and Yost told a conference of football coaches in New York, "The loss of his 'M' wasn't worth $2,400 to Angus Goetz." However, despite Yost's opinions, Goetz did later have a short run in professional football, playing nine games for the Buffalo All-Americans in 1922 and the Columbus Tigers in 1923. Goetz played professional football on the weekends while attending medical school. He later recalled, "We used to huddle in a hotel lobby before games to go over some signals. The game then wasn't like it is today."

== Medical career ==
Goetz completed his internship at the University Hospital in Ann Arbor in 1924. Goetz became a leading orthopedic surgeon in Detroit. He served in World War II and returned to Detroit in 1945 where he established an orthopedic practice in downtown Detroit. He went on to become the chief of orthopedics at Detroit Receiving Hospital, and continued to practice medicine until his retirement in 1972.

== Awards and honors ==
He was inducted into the Upper Peninsula Sports Hall of Fame in Marquette, Michigan in 1974. He also received the "Distinguished Alumni Award" from Sault Area High School in 1973.
