= 1921 Rose Bowl =

American college football game

1921 Tournament East-West football game
- 7th Rose Bowl Game
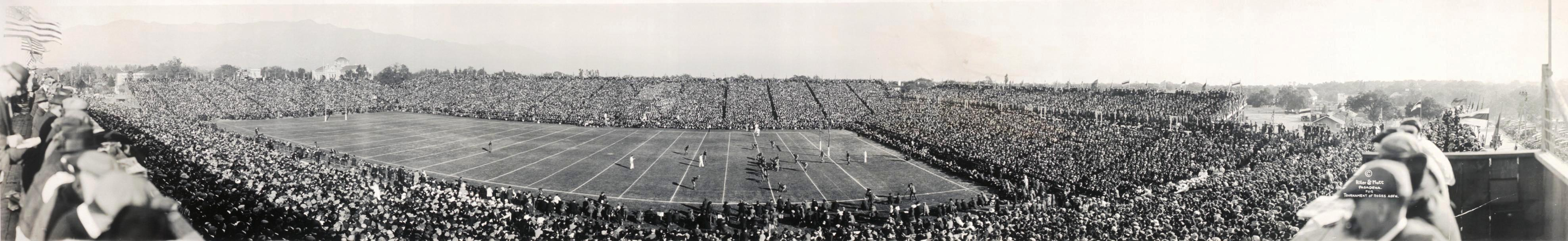
California Golden Bears	Ohio State Buckeyes
(8–0)	(7–0)
PCC	Big Ten
28	0
Head coach: Andy Smith	Head coach: John Wilce
	1	2	3	4	Total
California	7	14	0	7	28
Ohio State	0	0	0	0	0
- Date: January 1, 1921
- Season: 1920
- Stadium: Tournament Park
- Location: Pasadena, California
- MVP: Harold Muller (California)
- Attendance: 42,000

The 1921 Rose Bowl, known at the time as the Tournament East-West Football Game, was a college football bowl game played on January 1, 1921, at Tournament Park in Pasadena, California. It was the seventh Rose Bowl Game. The California Golden Bears defeated the Ohio State Buckeyes by a score of 28–0 in the second Big Ten Conference versus Pacific Coast Conference (PCC) meeting in the Rose Bowl, the first being the 1902 Rose Bowl, which featured Michigan and Stanford. California's victory stood as the only Rose Bowl win for a PCC team over a Big Ten team until the 1953 Rose Bowl.

California finished the season undefeated after handing Ohio State its first loss of the season. The Bears, who outscored their opponents 510–14 for the season, remained undefeated from 1920 until 1924. End Harold Muller was named Player of the Game. He completed a 53-yard touchdown pass to Brodie Stephens after receiving a toss from Pesky Sprott. Sprott scored two touchdowns after carrying the ball 20 times for 90 yards. It was the last time Ohio State was shut out until the 1993 season.

Ohio State All-American Gaylord Stinchcomb rushed for 82 yards.

== Scoring ==
	1	2	3	4	Total
California	7	14	0	7	28
Ohio State	0	0	0	0	0

Qtr.	Team	Scoring play	Score
1	CAL	Sprott 1 yard rush, Toomey kick good	CAL 7–0
2	CAL	Stephens 37 yard pass from Muller, Toomey kick good	CAL 14–0
2	CAL	Sprott 5 yard rush, Toomey kick good	CAL 21–0
4	CAL	Deeds 1 yard rush, Toomey kick good	CAL 28–0

== See also ==
- 2016 Fiesta Bowl (December) - The only other bowl game in which Ohio State was shut out in
