= 1920 Ohio State Buckeyes football team =

American college football season

1920 Ohio State Buckeyes football

Big Ten champion

Rose Bowl, L 0–28 vs. California
- Conference: Big Ten Conference, Ohio Athletic Conference
- Record: 7–1 (5–0 Big Ten, 2–0 OAC)
- Head coach: John Wilce (8th season)
- Home stadium: Ohio Field

1920 Big Ten Conference football standings
	Conf.					Overall
Team	W		L		T	W		L		T
Ohio State $	5	–	0	–	0	7	–	1	–	0
Wisconsin	4	–	1	–	0	6	–	1	–	0
Indiana	3	–	1	–	0	5	–	2	–	0
Illinois	4	–	2	–	0	5	–	2	–	0
Iowa	3	–	2	–	0	5	–	2	–	0
Michigan	2	–	2	–	0	5	–	2	–	0
Northwestern	2	–	3	–	0	3	–	4	–	0
Chicago	2	–	4	–	0	3	–	4	–	0
Purdue	0	–	4	–	0	2	–	5	–	0
Minnesota	0	–	6	–	0	1	–	6	–	0
$ – Conference champion

1920 Ohio Athletic Conference football standings
	Conf.					Overall
Team	W		L		T	W		L		T
Wooster $	7	–	0	–	0	9	–	0	–	0
Wittenberg	5	–	0	–	0	8	–	0	–	0
Ohio State	2	–	0	–	0	7	–	1	–	0
Denison	5	–	1	–	1	6	–	1	–	1
Oberlin	5	–	2	–	0	5	–	2	–	0
Heidelberg	3	–	2	–	0	7	–	2	–	0
Cincinnati	3	–	2	–	0	4	–	5	–	0
Miami (OH)	3	–	2	–	1	5	–	2	–	1
Mount Union	3	–	3	–	0	6	–	3	–	0
Ohio Wesleyan	3	–	3	–	0	4	–	3	–	0
Ohio Northern	2	–	3	–	0	3	–	4	–	0
Akron	2	–	4	–	0	4	–	4	–	0
Case	2	–	5	–	1	2	–	8	–	1
Ohio	1	–	3	–	0	4	–	3	–	0
Kenyon	1	–	6	–	1	2	–	5	–	1
Western Reserve	1	–	6	–	0	2	–	8	–	0
Hiram	0	–	6	–	0	0	–	9	–	0
$ – Conference champion

The 1920 Ohio State Buckeyes football team represented Ohio State University in the 1920 college football season. They outscored opponents 150–20 in the regular season and beat Michigan, 14–7. The Buckeyes compiled a 7–1 record, including the 1921 Rose Bowl in Pasadena, California, where they lost 28–0 to California.

Despite being in the Western Conference (Big Ten) together since 1913, this season had the first matchup between Ohio State and Chicago.

== Schedule ==
Date	Opponent	Site	Result	Attendance	Source
October 2	Ohio Wesleyan	Ohio Field; Columbus, OH	W 55–0		
October 9	Oberlin	Ohio Field; Columbus, OH	W 37–0		
October 16	Purdue	Ohio Field; Columbus, OH	W 17–0		
October 23	Wisconsin	Ohio Field; Columbus, OH	W 13–7		
October 30	at Chicago	Stagg Field; Chicago, IL	W 7–6		
November 6	Michigan	Ohio Field; Columbus, OH (rivalry)	W 14–7	> 20,000	
November 20	at Illinois	Illinois Field; Champaign, IL (rivalry)	W 7–0	19,921	
January 1, 1921	vs. California*	Tournament Park; Pasadena, CA (Rose Bowl)	L 0–28	42,000	
*Non-conference game

== Coaching staff ==
- John Wilce, head coach, eighth year
