= 1919 Big Ten Conference football season =

- Sport: American football
- Teams: 10
- Champion: Illinois
- Runners-up: Ohio State

Football seasons
- 1918 1920

1919 Big Ten Conference football standings
	Conf.					Overall
Team	W		L		T	W		L		T
Illinois $	6	–	1	–	0	6	–	1	–	0
Ohio State	3	–	1	–	0	6	–	1	–	0
Chicago	4	–	2	–	0	5	–	2	–	0
Wisconsin	3	–	2	–	0	5	–	2	–	0
Minnesota	3	–	2	–	0	4	–	2	–	1
Iowa	2	–	2	–	0	5	–	2	–	0
Michigan	1	–	4	–	0	3	–	4	–	0
Northwestern	1	–	4	–	0	2	–	5	–	0
Indiana	0	–	2	–	0	3	–	4	–	0
Purdue	0	–	3	–	0	2	–	4	–	1
$ – Conference champion

The 1919 Big Ten Conference football season was the 24th season of college football played by the member schools of the Big Ten Conference (also known as the Western Conference) and was a part of the 1919 college football season.

The 1919 Illinois Fighting Illini football team, under head coach Robert Zuppke, compiled a 6–1 record, won the Big Ten championship, and was selected retroactively as the national champion by the Billingsley Report and Boand System, and as a co-national champion by the College Football Researchers Association, Parke H. Davis, and Jeff Sagarin (using his alternate ELO-Chess methodology). Fullback Jack Crangle and guard Jack Depler received first-team All-Big Ten honors.

The 1919 Ohio State Buckeyes football team, under head coach John Wilce, also compiled a 6–1 record and led the conference in scoring defense (1.7 points allowed per game). Ohio State defeated Michigan for the first time in the history of the Michigan–Ohio State football rivalry. However, the Buckeyes lost to Illinois by two points in the final game of the season and finished in second place in the conference standings. Halfback Chic Harley was selected, for the third time, as a consensus first-team All-American.

Wisconsin center Charles Carpenter was a consensus first-team All-American. Chicago led the Big Ten in scoring offense with 29.3 points per game.

== Season overview ==
=== Results and team statistics ===
Conf. Rank	Team	Head coach	Overall record	Conf. record	PPG	PAG
1	Illinois	Robert Zuppke	6–1	6–1	13.0	6.9
2	Ohio State	John Wilce	6–1	3–1	25.1	**1.7**
3	Chicago	Amos Alonzo Stagg	5–2	4–2	**29.3**	3.7
4 (tie)	Wisconsin	John R. Richards	5–2	3–2	13.0	5.9
4 (tie)	Minnesota	Henry L. Williams	4–2–1	3–2	18.6	6.4
6	Iowa	Howard Jones	5–2	2–2	12.9	6.3
7 (tie)	Michigan	Fielding H. Yost	3–4	1–4	13.3	14.6
7 (tie)	Northwestern	Charlie Bachman	2–5	1–4	7.0	15.9
9	Indiana	Ewald O. Stiehm	3–4	0–2	10.0	9.1
10	Purdue	A. G. Scanlon	2–4–1	0–3	10.1	14.9

Key
PPG = Average of points scored per game; team with highest average in bold
PAG = Average of points allowed per game; team with lowest average in bold

=== Regular season ===
==== September 27 ====
On September 27, 1919, the Big Ten season opened with one non-conference game.

- Indiana 20, Wabash 7

==== October 4 ====
On October 4, 1919, the Big Ten football teams played seven non-conference games, resulting in five wins, one loss, and a tie. Chicago, Illinois, and Northwestern had bye weeks.

- Ohio State 38, Ohio Wesleyan 0
- Wisconsin 37, Ripon 0
- Minnesota 39, North Dakota 0
- Iowa 18, Nebraska 0
- Michigan 34, Case 0
- Centre 12, Indiana 3
- Purdue 14, Franklin 14

==== October 11 ====
On October 11, 1919, the Big Ten teams played one conference game and six non-conference games. The non-conference games resulted in six victories, giving the Big ten a 12–1–1 record up to that point in the season. Michigan and Iowa had a bye week.

- Illinois 14, Purdue 7
- Ohio State 46, Cincinnati 0
- Chicago 123, Great Lakes Navy 0
- Wisconsin 13, Marquette 0
- Minnesota 6, Nebraska 6
- Northwestern 20, DePauw 0
- Indiana 24, Kentucky 0

==== October 18 ====
On October 18, 1919, the Big Ten teams participated in four conference games and two non-conference games. The non-conference games resulted in two victories, giving the Big ten a 14–1–1 record up to that point in the season.

- Illinois 9, Iowa 7
- Chicago 16, Purdue 0
- Wisconsin 10, Northwestern 6
- Minnesota 20, Indiana 6
- Ohio State 49, Kentucky 0
- Michigan 26, Michigan Agricultural 0

==== October 25 ====
On October 25, 1919, the Big Ten teams played four conference games. Illinois and Indiana had bye weeks.

- Wisconsin 14, Illinois 10
- Ohio State 13, Michigan 3
- Chicago 41, Northwestern 0
- Iowa 9, Minnesota 6

==== November 1 ====
On November 1, 1919, the Big Ten teams played three conference games and three non-conference games. The non-conference games resulted in two victories and one defeat, giving the Big ten a 16–2–1 record up to that point in the season. Ohio State had a bye week.

- Illinois 10, Chicago 0
- Minnesota 19, Wisconsin 7
- Michigan 16, Northwestern 13
- Iowa 26, South Dakota 13
- Notre Dame 16, Indiana 3
- Purdue 13, Michigan Agricultural 7

==== November 8 ====
On November 8, 1919, the Big Ten teams played four conference games. Indiana and Wisconsin had bye weeks.

- Illinois 10, Minnesota 6
- Ohio State 20, Purdue 0
- Chicago 13, Michigan 0
- Iowa 14, Northwestern 7

==== November 15 ====
On November 8, 1919, the Big Ten teams played four conference games and one non-conference game. The non-conference game resulted in a victory, giving the Big ten a 17–2–1 record up to that point in the season. Minnesota had a bye week.

- Illinois 29, Michigan 7
- Ohio State 3, Wisconsin 0
- Chicago 9, Iowa 6
- Northwestern 3, Indiana 2
- Purdue 24, DePauw 0 (game played on Monday, November 17)

==== November 22 ====
On November 22, 1919, the Big Ten teams played three conference games and three non-conference games. The non-conference games resulted in two wins and a loss, giving the Big Ten a 19–3–1 record up to that point in the season. Northwestern had a bye week.

- Illinois 9, Ohio State 7
- Wisconsin 10, Chicago 3
- Minnesota 34, Michigan 7
- Iowa 10, Iowa State 0
- Indiana 12, Syracuse 6
- Notre Dame 33, Purdue 13

==== November 27 ====
On Thanksgiving Day, one Big Ten team played a game and lost, giving the Big Ten a 19–4–1 record.

- Rutgers 28, Northwestern 0

=== Bowl games ===
No Big Ten teams participated in any bowl games during the 1919 season.

== Awards and honors ==
=== All-Big Ten players ===
The following players were selected as first-team players on the 1919 All-Big Ten Conference football team by at least two of the following five selectors: E. C. Patterson in Collier's Weekly (ECP), Frank G. Menke (FM), the International News Service (INS), or Walter Eckersall (WE). It also includes players listed as members of the 1919 "All-Conference Team" as published in the "ESPN Big Ten Football Encyclopedia" (BTFE).

Position	Name	Team	Selectors
Quarterback	Gaylord Stinchcomb	Ohio State	BTFE, ECP, FM, WE
Halfback	Chic Harley	Ohio State	BTFE, ECP, FM, INS, WE
Halfback	Arnold Oss	Minnesota	BTFE, ECP, FM, INS, WE
Fullback	Jack Crangle	Illinois	FM, INS
Fullback	Fred Lohman	Iowa	BTFE, WE
End	Lester Belding	Iowa	BTFE, ECP, FM, INS, WE
End	Paul Meyers	Wisconsin	BTFE, FM, INS, WE
Tackle	Duke Slater	Iowa	BTFE, ECP, FM, INS, WE
Tackle	Charles Higgins	Chicago	BTFE, FM, INS, WE
Guard	Lloyd Pixley	Ohio State	ECP, FM, INS
Guard	Jack Depler	Illinois	BTFE [center], ECP, INS, WE [center]
Guard	Clarence Applegran	Illinois	BTFE, WE
Guard	William McCaw	Indiana	BTFE, WE
Center	Charles Carpenter	Wisconsin	ECP, FM, INS
Center	Ernie Vick	Michigan	BTFE

=== All-Americans ===
Three Big Ten players were selected as consensus first-team players on the 1919 College Football All-America Team. They were:

Position	Name	Team	Selectors
Halfback	Chic Harley	Ohio State	MS, WC, DJ, RE
End	Lester Belding	Iowa	MS
Center	Charles Carpenter	Wisconsin	MS
