= 1919 All-Eastern football team =

American all-star college football team

The 1919 All-Eastern football team consists of American football players chosen by various selectors as the best players at each position among the Eastern colleges and universities during the 1919 college football season.

== All-Eastern selections ==
=== Quarterbacks ===
- John Strubing, Princeton (UDD-3; TM-1)
- Willard Ackley, Syracuse (UDD-1)
- Benny Boynton, Williams (GT-1)
- Ockie Anderson, Colgate (UDD-2)
- Bo McMillin, Centre College (TM-2)

=== Halfbacks ===
- Eddie Casey, Harvard (UDD-1; TM-1; GT-1)
- Joe Trimble, Princeton (UDD-1; TM-2)
- Tom Davies, Pittsburgh (TM-1)
- Charley Way, Penn State (UDD-2)
- Andy Hastings, Pittsburgh (UDD-2)
- Hal Erickson, Washington & Jefferson (UDD-3)
- Jim Robertson, Dartmouth (UDD-3)

=== Fullbacks ===
- Ira Rodgers, West Virginia (UDD-1; TM-1; GT-1)
- Bodie Weldon, Lafayette (UDD-3; TM-2; GT-1)
- Jim Braden, Yale (UDD-2; TM-2)

=== Ends ===
- Heinie Miller, Penn (UDD-1; TM-2; GT-1)
- Bob Higgins, Penn State (UDD-2; TM-1; GT-1)
- Williams, Princeton (UDD-1)
- Joseph DuMoe, Lafayette (TM-1)
- Joe Schwarzer, Syracuse (UDD-2)
- Carroll, Washington & Jefferson (TM-2)
- Paul Hager, West Virginia (UDD-3)
- Desmond, Harvard (UDD-3)

=== Tackles ===
- Belford West, Colgate (UDD-1; TM-1: GT-1)
- Pete Henry, Washington & Jefferson (TM-1; GT-1)
- Tom Dickens, Yale (UDD-2; TM-2)
- Stan Keck, Princeton (UDD-2)
- Lou Little, Penn (TM-2)
- Harland Baker, Princeton (UDD-3)
- Wooster, Colgate (UDD-3)

=== Guards ===
- Hack McGraw, Princeton (UDD-1; TM-1: GT-1)
- Swede Youngstrom, Dartmouth (UDD-1; GT-1)
- Robert M. Sedgwick, Harvard (UDD-1)
- Doc Alexander, Syracuse (TM-1)
- Clark, Harvard (UDD-3; TM-2)
- Bert Shurtleff, Brown (UDD-2)
- Bertrand Gulick, Syracuse (UDD-2)
- Galt, Yale (TM-2)
- John Acosta, Yale (UDD-3)

=== Centers ===
- Russ Bailey, West Virginia (TM-2; GT-1)
- Tim Callahan, Yale (UDD-1)
- Harry J. Robertson, Syracuse (TM-1)
- Rex Wray, Penn (UDD-2)
- Bill Cunningham, Dartmouth (UDD-3)

== Key ==
- UDD = Urbana Daily Democrat
- TM = Tiny Maxwell
- GT = Gettysburg Times

== See also ==
- 1919 College Football All-America Team
