= 1920 All-Eastern football team =

American all-star college football team

The 1920 All-Eastern football team consists of American football players chosen by various selectors as the best players at each position among the Eastern colleges and universities during the 1920 college football season.

== All-Eastern selections ==
=== Quarterbacks ===
- Benny Boynton, Williams (US-1)
- Donold Lourie, Princeton (US-2)

=== Halfbacks ===
- Charley Way, Penn State (US-1)
- Tom Davies, Pittsburgh (US-1)
- Rex Wray, Penn (US-2)
- Arnold Horween, Harvard (US-2)

=== Fullbacks ===
- Walter French, Army (US-1)
- James Robertson, Dartmouth (US-2)

=== Ends ===
- Armant Legendre, Princeton (US-1)
- Luke Urban, Boston College (US-1)
- George Brown, Penn State (US-2)
- Harry J. Robertson, Syracuse (US-2)

=== Tackles ===
- Russ Stein, Washington & Jefferson (US-1)
- Stan Keck, Princeton (US-1)
- Gus Sonnenberg, Dartmouth (US-2)
- Mike Gulian, Brown (US-2)

=== Guards ===
- James Tolbert, Harvard (US-1)
- Fritz Breidster, Army (US-1)
- Percy W. Griffiths, Penn State (US-2)
- Tom Woods, Harvard (US-2)

=== Centers ===
- Herb Stein, Pittsburgh (US-1)
- Doc Alexander, Syracuse (US-2)

== Key ==
- US = Universal Service

== See also ==
- 1920 College Football All-America Team
