= 1919 All-Western college football team =

American all-star college football team

The 1919 All-Western college football team consists of American football players selected to the All-Western teams chosen by various selectors for the 1919 college football season.

== All-Western selections ==
=== Ends ===
- Paul Meyers, Wisconsin (FM, GB, HG, WE-1)
- Lester Belding, Iowa (FM, WE-1)
- Frank Weston, Wisconsin (HG, WE-2)
- Chuck Carney, Illinois (GB, WE-2) (CFHOF)

=== Tackles ===
- Charles Higgins, Chicago (FM, GB, HG, WE-1)
- Duke Slater, Iowa (FM, GB [guard], HG, WE-1) (CFHOF)
- Trygve Johnsen, Minnesota (GB)
- Burt Ingwersen, Illinois (WE-2)
- Angus Goetz, Michigan (WE-2)

=== Guards ===
- Clarence Applegran, Illinois (GB, WE-1)
- Lloyd Pixley, Ohio State (FM)
- William G. McCaw, Indiana (FM, WE-2)
- Iolas Huffman, Ohio State (HG)
- Lawrence O. Petty, Illinois (HG)
- Dick Barker, Iowa State (WE-1)
- Maurice J. "Clipper" Smith, Notre Dame (WE-2)

=== Centers ===
- Charles Carpenter, Wisconsin (FM, HG, WE-2)
- Williams, Minnesota (GB)
- Jack Depler, Illinois (WE-1)

=== Quarterbacks ===
- Gaylord Stinchcomb, Ohio State (FM, HG, WE-1) (CFHOF)
- Aubrey Devine, Iowa (GB) (CFHOF)
- Robert, Fletcher (WE-2)

=== Halfbacks ===
- Chic Harley, Ohio State (FM, GB, HG, WE-1) (CFHOF)
- Arnold Oss, Minnesota (FM, GB, WE-2)
- Leonard Bahan, Notre Dame (HG)
- George Gipp, Notre Dame (WE-1) (CFHOF)
- Laurie Walquist, Illinois (WE-2)

=== Fullbacks ===
- Jack Crangle, Illinois (FM)
- Lauer, Detroit (HG)
- Edmond R. Ruben, Minnesota (GB)
- Fred Lohman, Iowa (WE-1)
- John H. Hammes, Michigan Agricultural (WE-2)

== Key ==
ECP = E. C. Patterson for Collier's Weekly

FM = Frank G. Menke

GB = George A. Barton, sporting editor of Minneapolis Daily News

HG = H. C. Garrison in Detroit Times

WE = Walter Eckersall in Chicago Tribune

CFHOF = College Football Hall of Fame

== See also ==
- 1919 College Football All-America Team
- 1919 All-Big Ten Conference football team
