= 1920 All-America college football team =

Official list of the best college football players of 1920

The 1920 All-America college football team is composed of college football players who were selected as All-Americans by various organizations and writers that chose All-America college football teams in 1920. The four selectors recognized by the NCAA as "official" for the 1920 season are (1) Walter Camp (WC), whose selections were published in Collier's Weekly; (2) Football World magazine; (4) the International News Service, a news service operated by the Hearst newspapers; and (3) the Frank Menke syndicate (FM). Additional notable selectors who chose All-American teams in 1920 included Walter Eckersall (WE) of the Chicago Tribune, the United Press (UP), and The New York Times (NYT).

== Consensus All-Americans ==
For the year 1920, the NCAA recognizes four All-America selectors as "official" for purposes of its consensus determinations. The following chart identifies the NCAA-recognized consensus All-Americans and displays which official and other first-team designations they received.

Name	Position	School	Number	Official	Other
Stan Keck	Tackle	Princeton	4/4	FM, FW, INS, WC	LP, NEA, NYT, UP, WE
George Gipp	Fullback	Notre Dame	4/4	FM, FW, INS, WC	LP, NEA, UP, WE
Luke Urban	End	Boston College	2/4	FM, FW	LP, NYT
Tim Callahan	Guard	Yale	2/4	INS, WC	UP
Percy W. Griffiths	Guard	Penn State	2/4	FW, INS	NEA, UP
Tom Woods	Guard	Harvard	2/4	FW, WC	NYT
Herb Stein	Center	Pittsburgh	2/4	FM, WC	--
Doc Alexander	Center	Syracuse	2/4	FW, INS	NYT, UP
Donold Lourie	Quarterback	Princeton	2/4	INS, WC	LP, NYT, UP
Charley Way	Halfback	Penn State	2/4	INS, WC	UP
Gaylord Stinchcomb	Halfback	Ohio State	2/4	FM, WC	LP, WE
Tom Davies	Halfback	Pittsburgh	2/4	FM, FW	NYT, UP
Chuck Carney	End	Illinois	1/4	WC	LP, NEA UP, WE
Bill Fincher	End	Georgia Tech	1/4	WC	--
Ralph Scott	Tackle	Wisconsin	1/4	WC	--
Iolas Huffman	Guard	Ohio State	1/4	FM	LP

== All-Americans of 1920 ==
=== Ends ===
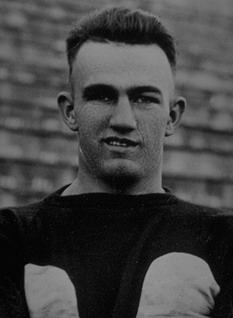
Bill Fincher.

- Chuck Carney, Illinois (College Football Hall of Fame) (INS-2; WC-1; UP-1; WE-1; NEA-1; LP-1)
- Bill Fincher, Georgia Tech (College Football Hall of Fame) (WC-1, LP-1 [as T])
- Luke Urban, Boston College (FM; FW; WC-2; LP-1; NYT)
- Armant Legendre, Princeton (FW; INS-1; WC-2; UP-3; WE-1; LP-2)
- Eddie Anderson, Notre Dame (College Football Hall of Fame) (UP-1; NEA-2)
- Frank Weston, Wisconsin (FM; INS-3; UP-2; WE-2; NEA-2; LP-2)
- Harold Muller, California (WC-3; NEA-1)
- Roger Kiley, Notre Dame (INS-1)
- Bird Carroll, Washington & Jefferson (NYT)
- Lester Belding, Iowa (WE-2; INS-2)
- Eddie Ewen, Navy (WC-3)
- Clarence Swanson, Nebraska (College Football Hall of Fame) (INS-3)
- Cyril E. Myers, Ohio State (UP-3)

=== Tackles ===
- Stan Keck, Princeton (College Football Hall of Fame) (FM; FW; WC-1; UP-1; WE-1; NEA-1; LP-1; INS-1; NYT)
- Ralph Scott, Wisconsin (WC-1; NEA-2)
- Bertrand Gulick, Syracuse (INS-1; UP-1; NYT)
- Robert Minturn Sedgwick, Harvard (FW; INS-2)
- Tillie Voss, Detroit (WC-3; WE-1)
- Gus Sonnenberg, Dartmouth (WE-2; UP-3; NEA-1; LP-2)
- Angus Goetz, Michigan (WC-2)
- Dan McMillan, Cal (College Football Hall of Fame) (WC-2)
- Frank Coughlin, Notre Dame (WE-2; INS-2)
- Thomas V. Dickens, Yale (WC-3; UP-2; INS-3)
- Roy Smoot, Oklahoma (NEA-2)
- Tad Wieman, Michigan (LP-2)
- Clyde W. King, Navy (UP-3; INS-3)
- Russ Stein, Washington & Jefferson (UP-2)

=== Guards ===
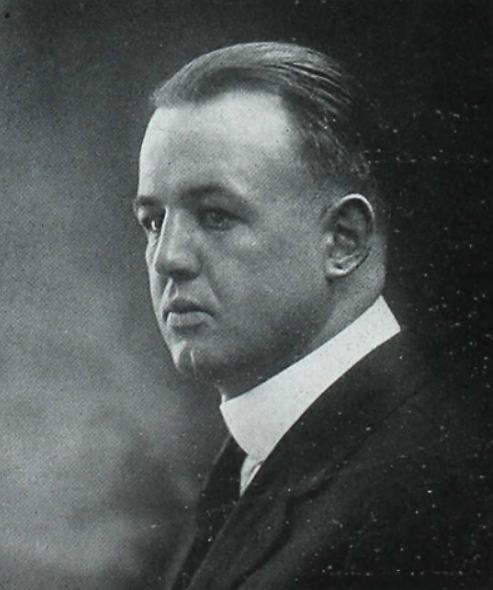
Tom Woods.

- Tim Callahan, Yale (INS-1; WC-1; UP-1)
- Tom Woods, Harvard (FW; INS-2; WC-1; UP-2; NEA-2; NYT)
- Iolas Huffman, Ohio State (FM; LP-1)
- Percy W. Griffiths, Penn State (FW; INS-1; UP-1; NEA-1; WE-2)
- James Randolph Tolbert, Harvard (FM; NEA-1; WE-1)
- Charles McGuire, Chicago (FM; INS-3)
- John Acosta, Yale (NEA-2; UP-2; WE-1)
- Harold Hess, Penn State (NYT)
- Edward E. Wilkie, Navy (WC-2; UP-3)
- Fritz Breidster, Army (WC-3; WE-2)
- Dean Trott, Ohio State (WC-3)
- Dummy Lebey, Georgia Tech (LP-2)
- George Hartong, Chicago (LP-2)
- Tarzan Taylor, Ohio State (INS-2)
- Albert W. T. Mohr, Illinois (INS-3)

=== Centers ===
Herb Stein.

- Herb Stein, Pittsburgh (College Football Hall of Fame) (FM; WC-1; WE-2)
- Doc Alexander, Syracuse (FW; INS-1; WC-2 [g]; UP-1; NEA-2; NYT)
- Polly Wallace, Ames (WE-1)
- Jack Depler, Illinois (NEA-1)
- Bill Cunningham, Dartmouth (WC-2; UP-2; INS-2)
- Charles Frederick Havemeyer, Harvard (WC-3)
- George Bunge, Wisconsin (LP-1; UP-3 [g])
- Andy Nemecek, Ohio State (LP-2)
- William Day, Nebraska (INS-3)
- Jack Heaphy, Boston College (UP-3)

=== Quarterbacks ===
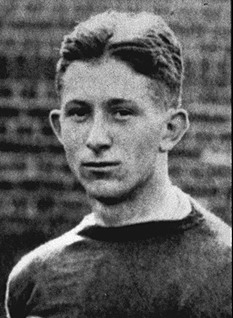
Donold Lourie.

- Donold Lourie, Princeton (College Football Hall of Fame) (INS-1; WC-1; UP-1; NEA-2; LP-1; NYT)
- Bo McMillin, Centre (College Football Hall of Fame) (FW; INS-3; WC-2; UP-2; WE-1; NEA-1; LP-2 [hb])
- Benny Boynton, Williams (INS-2; FM; WC-3; WE-2; INS-2)
- Hoge Workman, Ohio State (LP-2)
- Aubrey Devine, Iowa (UP-3)

=== Halfbacks ===
- Gaylord Stinchcomb, Ohio State (College Football Hall of Fame) (INS-2; FM; WC-1; WE-1; NEA-2; LP-1)
- Charley Way, Penn State (WC-1; UP-1; INS-1)
- Tom Davies, Pittsburgh (College Football Hall of Fame) (FM; FW; INS-2; WC-2; UP-1; WE-2; NYT)
- Phil White, Oklahoma (NEA-1)
- Hinkey Haines, Penn State (WC-3; WE-2; NEA-2)
- Jimmy Leech, Virginia Military Institute (College Football Hall of Fame) (WC-3; UP-3)
- George Owen, Harvard (INS-3)

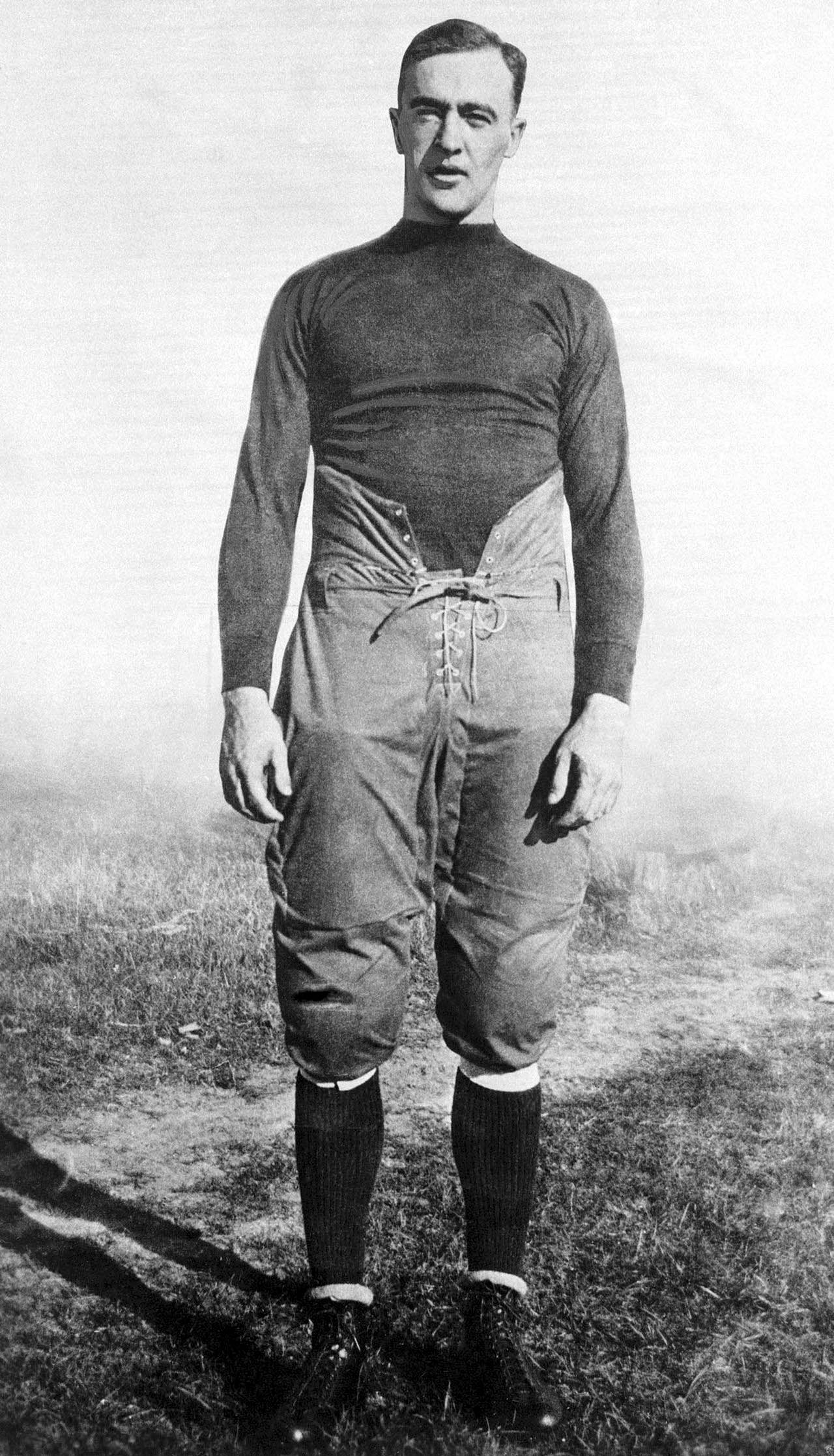
George Gipp.

=== Fullbacks ===
- George Gipp, Notre Dame (College Football Hall of Fame) (FM; FW; INS-1 [hb]; WC-1; LP-1 [hb]; NEA-1 [hb]; UP-1; WE-1 [hb])
- Arnold Horween, Harvard (INS-1; WC-3; LP-2; NEA-1; WE-1)
- Walter French, Army (FW; INS-3; WC-2; UP-2; LP-2 [hb])
- Hank Garrity, Princeton (WC-2 [hb]; UP-2; LP-1; NYT [hb])
- Jim Robertson, Dartmouth (UP-2 [e]; NYT)
- Jack Crangle, Illinois (UP-2; WE-2; NEA-2; INS-2)
- Buck Flowers, Georgia Tech (UP-3 [hb]; INS-3)
- Fred Strauss, Penn (UP-3)

== Key ==
NCAA recognized selectors for 1920

- WC = Walter Camp
- FW = Football World magazine
- INS = International News Service, selected by Jake Velock
- FM = Frank Menke Syndicate, Frank G. Menke (sporting editor King Features Syndicate)

Other selectors

- UP = Henry L. Farrell, United Press Staff Correspondent
- WE = Walter Eckersall, of the Chicago Tribune
- NEA = Newspaper Association of America, by Dean Snyder
- LP = Lawrence Perry, "acknowledged authority on college sports," for the Consolidated Press
- NYT = The New York Times

Bold = Consensus All-American

- 1 – First-team selection
- 2 – Second-team selection
- 3 – Third-team selection

== See also ==
- 1920 All-Big Ten Conference football team
- 1920 All-Eastern football team
- 1920 All-Pacific Coast football team
- 1920 All-Southern college football team
- 1920 All-Western college football team
