= 1919 Wisconsin Badgers football team =

American college football season

1919 Wisconsin Badgers football
- Conference: Big Ten Conference
- Record: 5–2 (3–2 Big Ten)
- Head coach: John R. Richards (3rd season)
- Captain: Charles Carpenter
- Home stadium: Camp Randall Stadium

1919 Big Ten Conference football standings
	Conf.					Overall
Team	W		L		T	W		L		T
Illinois $	6	–	1	–	0	6	–	1	–	0
Ohio State	3	–	1	–	0	6	–	1	–	0
Chicago	4	–	2	–	0	5	–	2	–	0
Wisconsin	3	–	2	–	0	5	–	2	–	0
Minnesota	3	–	2	–	0	4	–	2	–	1
Iowa	2	–	2	–	0	5	–	2	–	0
Michigan	1	–	4	–	0	3	–	4	–	0
Northwestern	1	–	4	–	0	2	–	5	–	0
Indiana	0	–	2	–	0	3	–	4	–	0
Purdue	0	–	3	–	0	2	–	4	–	1
$ – Conference champion

The 1919 Wisconsin Badgers football team was an American football team that represented the University of Wisconsin in the 1919 Big Ten Conference football season. The team compiled a 5–2 record (3–2 against conference opponents), finished in a tie for fourth place in the Big Ten Conference, and outscored all opponents by a combined total of 91 to 41. John R. Richards was in his third year as Wisconsin's head coach.

Center Charles Carpenter was the team captain. Carpenter was also a consensus first-team selection for the 1919 College Football All-America Team.

End Paul Meyers was selected as an All-American by Walter Eckersall. Meyers had an 80-yard touchdown reception, on a pass from Wally Barr, in a game against Minnesota on November 1, 1919. The play held the Wisconsin record for longest pass and reception for 63 years.

Three Wisconsin players received first-team All-Big Ten honors: Charles Carpenter, Paul Meyers, and end Frank Weston.

== Schedule ==
Date	Opponent	Site	Result	Attendance	Source
October 4	Ripon*	Camp Randall Stadium; Madison, WI	W 37–0		
October 11	Marquette*	Camp Randall Stadium; Madison, WI	W 13–0		
October 18	at Northwestern	Northwestern Field; Evanston, IL	W 10–6		
October 25	at Illinois	Illinois Field; Champaign, IL	W 14–10	7,260	
November 1	Minnesota^{†}	Camp Randall Stadium; Madison, WI (rivalry)	L 7–19	20,000	
November 15	Ohio State	Camp Randall Stadium; Madison, WI	L 0–3		
November 22	at Chicago	Stagg Field; Chicago, IL	W 10–3		
*Non-conference game; ^{†}Homecoming
