= 1919 Illinois Fighting Illini football team =

American college football season

1919 Illinois Fighting Illini football
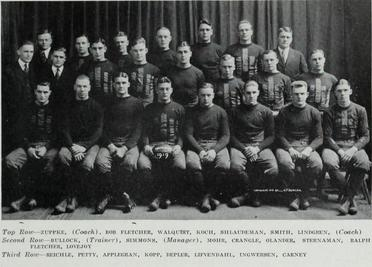

National champion (Billingsley, Boand) Co-national champion (CFRA, Davis, Sagarin-ELO) Big Ten champion
- Conference: Big Ten Conference
- Record: 6–1 (6–1 Big Ten)
- Head coach: Robert Zuppke (7th season)
- Offensive scheme: T formation
- Captain: William Kopp
- Home stadium: Illinois Field

Uniform
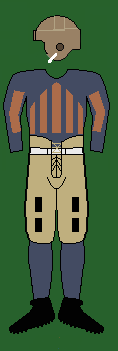

1919 Big Ten Conference football standings
	Conf.					Overall
Team	W		L		T	W		L		T
Illinois $	6	–	1	–	0	6	–	1	–	0
Ohio State	3	–	1	–	0	6	–	1	–	0
Chicago	4	–	2	–	0	5	–	2	–	0
Wisconsin	3	–	2	–	0	5	–	2	–	0
Minnesota	3	–	2	–	0	4	–	2	–	1
Iowa	2	–	2	–	0	5	–	2	–	0
Michigan	1	–	4	–	0	3	–	4	–	0
Northwestern	1	–	4	–	0	2	–	5	–	0
Indiana	0	–	2	–	0	3	–	4	–	0
Purdue	0	–	3	–	0	2	–	4	–	1
$ – Conference champion

The 1919 Illinois Fighting Illini football team was an American football team that represented the University of Illinois in the Big Ten Conference during the 1919 college football season. In their seventh season under head coach Robert Zuppke, the Fighting Illini compiled a 6–1 record (6–1 against Big Ten opponents) and outscored their opponents by a combined total of 91 to 48.

There was no contemporaneous system in 1919 for determining a national champion. However, Illinois was retroactively named as the national champion for 1919 by the Billingsley Report and Boand System, and as a co-national champion by the College Football Researchers Association, Parke H. Davis, and Jeff Sagarin (using his alternate ELO-Chess methodology).

Fullback William Kopp was the team captain. Three Illinois players received mention on the 1919 All-America college football team: end Dick Reichle (first-team choice by the Reno Evening Gazette); tackle Burt Ingwersen (second-team choice by Walter Camp); and guard Jack Depler (second-team choice by Camp).

Seven Illini players were included on the 1919 All-Big Ten Conference football team: quarterback Robert H. Fletcher; halfback Laurie Walquist; fullback Jack Crangle; end Chuck Carney; tackle Burt Ingerwesen; and guards Jack Depler and Clarence Applegran.

== Schedule ==
Date	Time	Opponent	Site	Result	Attendance	Source
October 11		at Purdue	Stuart Field; West Lafayette, IN (rivalry)	W 14–7	4,000	
October 18		Iowa	Illinois Field; Champaign, IL	W 9–7	6,470	
October 25		Wisconsin	Illinois Field; Champaign, IL	L 10–14	7,260	
November 1		Chicago^{†}	Illinois Field; Champaign, IL	W 10–0	16,000–17,000	
November 8	3:30 p.m.	at Minnesota	Northrop Field; Minneapolis, MN	W 10–6	20,000	
November 15		Michigan	Illinois Field; Champaign, IL (rivalry)	W 29–7	9,622–14,000	
November 22		at Ohio State	Ohio Field; Columbus, OH (rivalry)	W 9–7	14,925	
^{†}Homecoming; All times are in Central time

== Roster ==
Player	Position
William Kopp (Captain)	Fullback
Burt Ingwersen	Tackle
John C. Depler	Halfback
Clarence Applegran	Right guard
Robert Fletcher	Quarterback
Ralph Fletcher	Kicker
Chuck Carney	End, receiver, punter
Lawrence Walquist	Halfback, quarterback
Albert Mohr	Guard
Richard W. Reichle	Left end, kicker
Milton Olander	Guard, tackle
R. A. "Lief" Lifvendahl	Tackle
George Koch	Tackle
Larry Petty	Right tackle
Harry Shlaudeman	Center
Jack Crangle	Fullback
C. Ernest Lovejoy	Quarterback
Stuyvesant Smith	End

- Head coach: Robert Zuppke (7th year at Illinois)

== Awards and honors ==
- Dick Reichle, end

- First-team selection of Reno Evening Gazette, selected by "W.P. Hahn, football expert of national note who is now located in Reno", for the 1919 College Football All-America Team

- Burt Ingwersen, tackle

- Second-team selection by Walter Camp for the 1919 All-America team

- Jack Depler, guard

- Second-team selection by Walter Camp for the 1919 All-America team
