= 1921 All-Pro Team =

Official list of the best NFL players in 1921

The 1921 All-Pro Team represented the All-Pro team for the 1921 season of the American Professional Football Association (APFA), later renamed the National Football League (NFL). It was compiled by the Buffalo Evening News.

Bruce Copeland, sports editor of the Rock Island Argus, who published an extensive All-Star team for the APFA in 1920, was replaced by J.L. Hughes by the time of the 1921 season and no comparable effort was made by that publication following the association's second year.

== Team ==
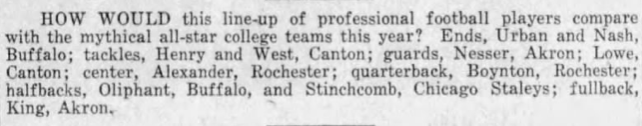
Team selection as it appeared in The Buffalo Evening News

Player	Position	Team
Luke Urban	End	Buffalo
Bob Nash	End	Buffalo
Pete Henry	Tackle	Canton
Belf West	Tackle	Canton
Al Nesser	Guard	Akron
Bulger Lowe	Guard	Cleveland
Doc Alexander	Center	Rochester
Benny Boynton	Quarterback	Rochester/Washington
Elmer Oliphant	Halfback	Buffalo
Gaylord Stinchcomb	Halfback	Chicago
Rip King	Fullback	Akron
