= Dick Barker =

American athlete, coach, and athletic director (1897–1964)

- Barker from the 1925 Michiganensian

Biographical details
- Born: January 6, 1897; Sedalia, Missouri, U.S.
- Died: December 17, 1964 (aged 67); State College, Pennsylvania, U.S.

Playing career
- 1916–1919: Iowa State
- 1921: Chicago Staleys
- Position: Guard

Coaching career (HC unless noted)

Football
- 1922: Iowa State (assistant)
- 1923: Cornell (IA) (assistant)
- 1924–1925: Michigan (assistant)
- 1925–1940: Cornell (IA)
- 1942–1943: Franklin & Marshall

Wrestling
- 1923-1924: Cornell (IA)
- 1924–1925: Michigan
- 1925–1940: Cornell (IA)

Administrative career (AD unless noted)
- 1925–1940: Cornell (IA)

Head coaching record
- Overall: 74–63–15 (football); 74–61–2 (wrestling)

Accomplishments and honors

Championships
- Football; 3 MWC (1925, 1927, 1937)

Awards
- All-American (1919); College Wrestling Hall of Fame

Richard William Barker Sr. (January 6, 1897 – December 17, 1964) was an American football player and coach, wrestler and wrestling coach, and athletic director. He played professional football for the Chicago Staleys. Barker served as the head football coach at Cornell College and Franklin & Marshall College as well as starting the wrestling programs at Michigan and Cornell College.

== College career ==
At Iowa State University, Barker was a star both on the football field and wrestling mat. Under head football coach Charles Mayser, Barker anchored the offensive line from the guard position. Career highlights were being named first-team All-Missouri Valley in 1917 and All-American, All-Western team, and All-Missouri Valley in 1919.

In his collegiate wrestling career, Barker went 10–1–1, including five pins. In 1920 and 1921 he won the intercollegiate championship in the 175-pound weight class; this is the predecessor to the NCAA championship.

== Professional career ==
After graduation Barker received a telegram from George Halas with an offer to play football for the Chicago Staleys, who would eventually become the Bears, of the American Professional Football Association. Barker, without a job or money, accepted the offer and played the 1921 season for the Staleys. This made Barker the first Cyclone to ever play football professionally. That season marked two major landmarks for the team, the inaugural Bears–Packers rivalry game and the Staleys winning the league championship.

After his one season in the professional ranks Barker realized there was no money or future in playing football, so he moved back to Ames to be an assistant coach at his alma mater, Iowa State under Sam Willaman.

== Coaching career ==
Barker began his coaching career as a football assistant at Iowa State for the 1922 season. The following season he was hired to form the inaugural wrestling program at Cornell College in Mount Vernon, Iowa in addition to being an assistant football coach. In 1923 Barker was hired by the University of Michigan to repeat the same process, form a wrestling program and serve as an assistant football coach.

In 1925, Barker was again hired by Cornell, this time to serve as head football coach, head wrestling coach, as well as athletic director.

Cornell wrestling saw tremendous success under Barker. As a team, the Rams went 73–48–2 with six top 20 NCAA finishes during his 36 seasons. He also coached several wrestlers to great individual success with one NCAA champion in Dale Brand and four future olympians in Kenneth Truckenmiller (1924), Lloyd Appleton (1928), Lyle Morford (1932), and Dale Brand (1936). Appleton won a silver medal at the 158.5 weight class in the freestyle division.

Additionally, Barker helped draft the first collegiate wrestling rules and helped plan the first NCAA tournament in 1928. He was also an assistant coach of the 1928 U.S. Olympic Wrestling team.

== Head coaching record ==
=== Football ===
Year	Team	Overall	Conference	Standing	Bowl/playoffs
Cornell Purple (Midwest Conference) (1925–1940)
1925	Cornell	6–0–2	3–0–1	T–1st	
1926	Cornell	3–4	3–3	T–4th	
1927	Cornell	7–1	6–0	1st	
1928	Cornell	1–7–1	1–4	8th	
1929	Cornell	2–6	2–3	6th	
1930	Cornell	3–4–1	3–1–1	2nd	
1931	Cornell	2–7	2–2	4th	
1932	Cornell	3–4–2	2–1–1	4th	
1933	Cornell	4–3–2	3–1–1	T–2nd	
1934	Cornell	2–7	1–4	6th	
1935	Cornell	5–1–3	3–1–1	2nd	
1936	Cornell	3–5	3–3	T–4th	
1937	Cornell	9–0	7–0	1st	
1938	Cornell	3–5–1	1–3–1	6th	
1939	Cornell	7–2	4–2	3rd	
1940	Cornell	5–3–1	4–2–1	4th	
Cornell:		65–59–13	48–30–7		
Franklin & Marshall Diplomats (Eastern Pennsylvania Collegiate Conference) (1942)
1942	Franklin & Marshall	1–4–2	0–2–1	T–4th	
Franklin & Marshall Diplomats (Independent) (1943)
1943	Franklin & Marshall	7–1			
Franklin & Marshall:		9–4–2			
Total:		74–63–15			
National championship Conference title Conference division title or championship game berth
