= Larry Petty =

American football player (1893–1963)

Profile
- Positions: Guard, Tackle

Personal information
- Born: November 27, 1893; Sumner, Illinois, U.S.
- Died: March 17, 1963 (aged 69); Columbia, Mississippi, U.S.

Career information
- High school: Lawrenceville (Lawrenceville, Illinois)
- College: Illinois (1916, 1919)

Career history
- Canton Bulldogs (1920)

Awards and highlights
- National champion (1919)

Career statistics
- Games played: 2
- Stats at Pro Football Reference

Lawrence Otis Petty (November 27, 1893 – March 17, 1963) was an American professional football guard and tackle who played in the American Professional Football Association (APFA) with the Canton Bulldogs. He played college football for the Illinois Fighting Illini.

== Early life ==
Petty was born on November 27, 1893, in Sumner, Illinois. He attended Lawrenceville High School in Lawrenceville, Illinois.

== College career ==
Petty played college football for the Illinois Fighting Illini in 1916 and 1919 at right tackle. He lettered both years, while he spent the 1917 and 1918 seasons serving in the Signals Officer Reserve Corps, Balloon Division during World War I.

== Professional career ==
In 1920, Petty played two games for the Canton Bulldogs of the American Professional Football Association (APFA) at guard.

== Personal life ==
After one season of professional football, Petty was employed in the oil field business, working in Pennsylvania, Texas and Venezuela. He later moved to Mississippi, where he had a cattle ranch. Petty died on March 17, 1963, in Columbia, Mississippi.
