= Donold Lourie =

American businessman and football player (1899–1990)

Don Lourie
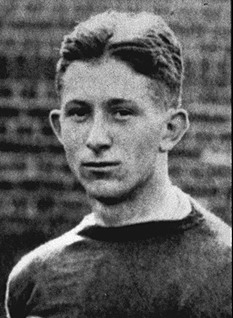
- Donold Lourie in 1920

Princeton Tigers
- Position: Quarterback

Personal information
- Born: August 22, 1899; Decatur, Alabama, U.S.
- Died: January 15, 1990 (aged 90); Wilmette, Illinois, U.S.
- Listed height: 5 ft 11 in (1.80 m)
- Listed weight: 164 lb (74 kg)

Career information
- High school: LaSalle-Peru High School; Phillips Exeter Academy
- College: Princeton (1920–1921)

Awards and highlights
- Consensus All-American (1920); Third-team All-American (1921)
- College Football Hall of Fame (Class of 1974)

Donold Lourie

1st Under Secretary of State for Administration
- In office February 16, 1953 – March 5, 1954
- Preceded by: Position Established
- Succeeded by: Charles E. Saltzman

Donold B. Lourie (August 22, 1899 – January 15, 1990) was an American businessman, government official, and college football player. He served for many years as the president of the Quaker Oats Company, and held various other executive positions there and for several other businesses. President Dwight D. Eisenhower appointed Lourie to a position in the State Department, and he served in that capacity for one year. Lourie attended Princeton University, where he was a star quarterback, and he was named a consensus All-American as a junior. Lourie was inducted into the College Football Hall of Fame in 1974.

== Early life ==
Lourie was born on August 22, 1899, in Decatur, Alabama. He grew up in Peru, Illinois, where he attended LaSalle-Peru High School. He then attended boarding school at the prestigious Phillips Exeter Academy. He played football there, and in his junior season in 1916, scored the winning touchdown against his school's "ancient rival", Andover. On the first play in the fourth quarter, he went around the left end to rush 33 yards for the game's only score.

== Education and college football ==
He attended college at Princeton University, where he played football and competed in track and field. In track, Lourie won the British AAA Championships title in the long jump event at the 1920 AAA Championships. In football, he played as a quarterback and was named a consensus All-American as a junior in 1920. Teammate and fellow All-American Stan Keck wrote a few years later that the 1920 Princeton–Yale game "stands out in my mind as that which offered the most stirring spectacle of my career." Princeton led in the last minute of the first half, 3–0, during which they had struggled against their opponent. With the ball on the Yale 40-yard line and only enough time remaining for one play, the Elis assumed that Princeton would attempt a field goal. Keck was set to be the kicker and Lourie the holder. When it became apparent Yale would attempt to block the kick, Lourie made an audible to fake a kick attempt and run the ball himself. Keck threw a block and allowed Lourie to run to the end zone for a touchdown. Princeton later extended their lead and won, 20–0, and finished the season with a 6–0–1 record. Walter Camp described Lourie as "the remarkable little general, disclosing every weak point of the opposition."

Lourie missed half of his senior season in 1921 because of an injury. He was awarded the Poe Memorial Cup for services rendered to the team both as a junior and a senior. Lourie was named to the all-time Princeton team in 1948, and in 1964, the National Football Foundation bestowed upon him its Gold Medal for lifetime achievement. He was inducted into the College Football Hall of Fame in 1974. In his honor, Princeton created the Donold B. Lourie Award, which is awarded annually to the team's most outstanding freshman. Lourie graduated as the president of his class in 1922. He declined an offer to play for the Chicago Bears in the fledgling National Football League, and instead, remained at his alma mater as its backfield coach.

== Professional career ==
Lourie then went to work for the Quaker Oats Company. In 1923, he married Mary Edna King with whom he later had a son, Donold K. Lourie who became an attorney, businessman, and novelist. He became the president of Quaker Oats in 1947. In 1953, he took a leave of absence from Quaker when President Dwight D. Eisenhower appointed him as the Under Secretary of State for Administration where Lourie oversaw a reorganization of the department. He returned to Quaker the following year, and in 1956, he became the chief executive officer, and in 1961, the chairman. At different times, Lourie also acted as director for Illinois Central Industries, the International Paper Company, International Harvester, and the Northern Trust Company. In 1970, Lourie retired from Quaker and moved to Longwood, Florida. He died on January 15, 1990, at the age of 90 in Wilmette, Illinois.

Government offices
Preceded by New Office	Under Secretary of State for Administration; February 16, 1953 – March 5, 1954	Succeeded by Charles E. Saltzman
