= Aubrey Devine =

American football and basketball player and coach (1897–1981)

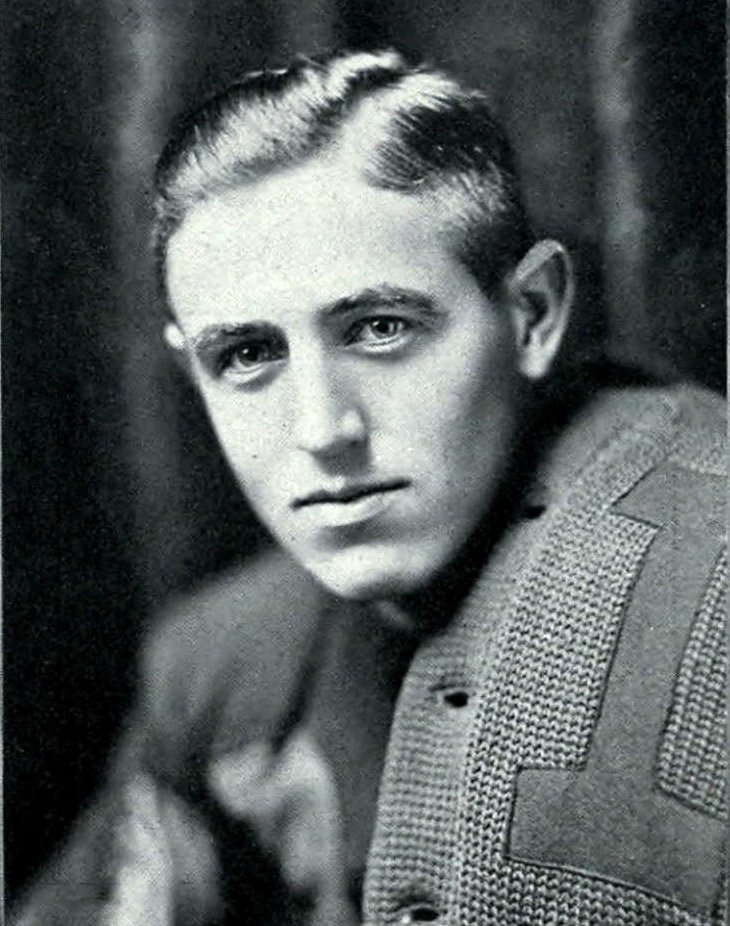
- Devine in 1923

Biographical details
- Born: November 21, 1897; Des Moines, Iowa, U.S.
- Died: December 15, 1981 (aged 84); San Diego, California, U.S.

Playing career

Football
- 1919–1921: Iowa

Basketball
- 1919–1922: Iowa

Track and field
- 1919–1922: Iowa
- Position: Quarterback (football)

Coaching career (HC unless noted)

Football
- 1923–1924: Denver (backfield)
- 1925–1936: USC (assistant)

Basketball
- 1923–1925: Denver

Head coaching record
- Overall: 9–14

Accomplishments and honors

Awards
- Consensus All-American (1921); 3× All-Big Ten (1919, 1920, 1921); All-Time Hawkeye Team; Iowa Sports Hall of Fame
- College Football Hall of Fame; Inducted in 1973 (profile)

Aubrey Alvin "Aub" Devine (November 21, 1897 – December 15, 1981) was an American football and basketball player, coach, and lawyer. He was the quarterback for the University of Iowa Hawkeyes football team from 1919 to 1921. He was selected as a first-team All-Big Ten Conference player all three years at Iowa and was the consensus All-American quarterback in 1921. Devine served as the head basketball coach at the University of Denver for two seasons, from 1923 to 1925. He later worked as an assistant football coach under Howard Jones at the University of Southern California (USC). Devine was inducted into the College Football Hall of Fame as a player in 1973.

== Early life ==
Devine was born in 1897 in Des Moines, Iowa. His father, William Samuel Devine, was an Iowa native, and his mother, Elizabeth Victoria Foreman, was a Missouri native. At the time of the 1900 United States census, Devine's father was employed as a teamster living in Des Moines, and Aubrey was the youngest among the nine children of William and Elizabeth. By 1910, Devine's family had moved to New Hope Township in Union County, Iowa, where his father was employed as a farmer. The family later returned to Des Moines where Devine's father again worked as a teamster.

Devine attended West High School in Des Moines, where he and older brother, Glenn, were tenors in the glee club. He and Glenn also played for the school's football, basketball and track teams. In track, he was a hurdler, weights man, and pole vaulter. The Devine brothers led the West High School football team to an undefeated championship season in 1916. His education was interrupted in 1917 by "farm" service during World War I. He also served in the United States Marine Corps for a year during the war.

== University of Iowa ==
Aubrey and Glenn enrolled at Drake University in Des Moines in January 1919. They then transferred to the University of Iowa after one week at Drake.

=== 1919 season ===
The brothers became starters on the 1919 Iowa Hawkeyes football team with Aubrey at left halfback and Glenn at right halfback, becoming known for his "deceptive speed" and his ability to pass with precision while running. Glenn was credited with helping pave the way for Aubrey with his blocking. Aubrey also played defensive back, punter, kicker, punt returner, and kick returner. He was considered a triple-threat man who AP sports editor Harry Grayson described as follows

Aubrey A. Devine did everything superlatively. Iowa's first All-American ran, passed, punted for distance, was adept at quick-kicking, an accurate place-kicker, and his drop-kick snapped a Notre Dame winning streak in 1921.

Following an injury to Iowa's quarterback, Devine moved from halfback to quarterback in the third game of the 1919 season against the Minnesota Golden Gophers. Iowa had never defeated the Golden Gophers in a game played in Minnesota, but Devine led the Hawkeyes to a 9–6 victory at Northrop Field in Minneapolis. He ran for a touchdown in the first half and kicked the game-winning, 27-yard field goal with second remaining in the game. Iowa won four of its last five games in 1919, with Devine accounting for all of Iowa's points in victories over Northwestern and Iowa State. At the end of the 1919 season, Devine was selected as the first-team quarterback on several All-Big Ten Conference and All-Western teams.

=== 1920 season ===
Devine led the 1920 Iowa football team to a 5–2 record and led the Big Ten Conference in scoring. Devine was teamed up with Gordon Locke, a fullback who powered the ball into the line, while Devine used his speed to run the ball to the outside. In the 1920 season opener, Devine scored Iowa's first touchdown and then threw a game-winning pass as Iowa defeated Indiana, 14–7. Devine and Locke each scored two touchdowns as Iowa defeated Minnesota, 28–7, for the third consecutive year. It was the first time that Minnesota had been defeated three years in a row by a single opponent.

In the last game of the 1920 season, Devine passed for a touchdown, rushed for a touchdown, and intercepted three passes in a victory over Iowa State. Devine led the Big Ten in scoring in 1920 and was again selected as the first-team quarterback on several All-Big Ten and All-Western football teams.

=== 1921 season ===
Devine was the team captain and starting quarterback of the undefeated 1921 Iowa football team. In the second game of the season, Iowa faced Notre Dame, coached by Knute Rockne. It was Iowa's first meeting with Notre Dame. Notre Dame's captain was Eddie Anderson, who later served as head football coach at Iowa for eight seasons between 1939 and 1949. The Irish had not lost a game since 1918, a span of 20 straight wins. Devine kicked the game-winning field goal as Iowa pulled a 10–7 upset.

On October 29, 1921, Devine accounted for all of Iowa's points in a 13–6 win over Purdue. He threw a touchdown pass to Lester Belding in the second quarter and then kicked the extra point. He then returned a punt 30 yards "through the entire Purdue team" for the second touchdown, but missed the extra point. Clark Shaughnessy called Devine's punt return at Purdue "one of the 12 greatest individual plays in the history of football". But Iowa's next game against Minnesota would be Devine's signature game.

Devine accounted for 464 total yards and six touchdowns as Iowa defeated Minnesota, 41–7. The 41 points were the most ever scored against Minnesota in a game and remained so the first 60 years of their program's history. Devine passed for two touchdowns, rushed for four touchdowns, and kicked five extra points. He rushed for 162 yards, passed for 122 yards, and had 200 return yards on kicks, punts, and interceptions. Minnesota coach Henry L. Williams called Devine "the greatest player who ever stepped on our field," and "the greatest back field player the country has ever known."

The next week against Indiana, Devine rushed for 183 yards and four more touchdowns and passed for 102 yards before leaving the game in the third quarter. Devine scored 57 points in consecutive weeks.

In his final college football game, Devine led Iowa to a 14–0 win over Northwestern. Four minutes into the game, Devine threw a pass to his brother Glenn, who ran for a touchdown and a 35-yard gain. Devine also kicked both of Iowa's extra points. The victory over Northwestern capped a 7–0 final record, and secured Iowa's first Big Ten title in 20 years.

Devine led the conference in scoring for the second time and was named first team All-Big Ten for the third straight year. He was a consensus first team All-American in 1921, the second in school history, following Belding in 1919. Devine's 895 yards rushing in 1921 is still an Iowa season record for a quarterback, and he led Iowa in rushing, passing, and scoring each of his three years in uniform.

=== Other sports and honors ===
In addition to playing football, Devine competed for Iowa in basketball and track. He earned nine varsity letters at Iowa, three each in football, basketball and track. He also won a Big Ten Medal for excellence in athletics and academics. He was inducted into the College Football Hall of Fame in 1973 in the pioneer player category. Devine was also one of five football players inducted into the Iowa Sports Hall of Fame in the Hall's inaugural year in 1951, joining Nile Kinnick, Duke Slater, Jay Berwanger, and Elmer Layden.

In 1989, Iowa fans selected an all-time Iowa Hawkeyes football team during the 100th anniversary celebration of Iowa football. While Chuck Long was chosen as the all-time quarterback, Devine was named to the all-time offensive team as a halfback. In 1999, Sports Illustrated selected Aubrey Devine as the 15th greatest sports figure in the history of the state of Iowa.

== Coaching and later years ==
After graduation, Devine coached basketball in 1924 and 1925 at the University of Denver.

Devine was an assistant coach from 1925 to 1936 for the University of Southern California Trojans football team under Howard Jones. He began as the backfield coach and in 1926 took over as the coach of USC's freshman football team.

Devine left coaching for law school and became an attorney for the United States Department of Veterans Affairs. He retired in California and lived to be 84 years old.
