= Bertrand Gulick =

American football player and businessman (1898–1972)

Profile
- Position: Tackle

Personal information
- Born: March 20, 1898; Princeton, New Jersey
- Died: December 9, 1972 (aged 74); Princeton, New Jersey

Career information
- College: Syracuse University

Career history
- 1918–1921: Syracuse

Awards and highlights
- First-team All-American (1920)

Bertrand L. Gulick, Jr. (March 20, 1898 – December 9, 1972) was an American football player and businessman.

He played at the tackle position for the Syracuse Orange football team. He was selected by the United Press, International News Service, and The New York Times as a first-team player on their 1920 College Football All-America Team. He was also a member of the men's crew from 1919 to 1922.

Gulick later served in the Army during World War II. He also owned and operated the Gulick Agency, a life insurance agency in New Jersey. He was also a farmer and real estate broker. He also served as a Princeton committeeman and a member of the Mercer County Executive Committee.
