= Lloyd Pixley =

American football player

Ohio State Buckeyes
- Position: Guard

Personal information
- Born: c. 1900; Columbus, Ohio, U.S.
- Died: July 30, 1954; Columbus, Ohio, U.S.
- Listed height: 6 ft 1.5 in (1.87 m)
- Listed weight: 230 lb (104 kg)

Career information
- College: Ohio State (1918−1919, 1921−1922)

Awards and highlights
- Third-team All-American (1919); 3× First-team All-Big Ten (1919, 1921, 1922)

Lloyd A. "Butch" Pixley (c. 1900 − July 30, 1954) was an American football player. A native of Columbus, Ohio, he played college football for the Ohio State Buckeyes at the guard position in 1918, 1919, 1921, and 1922.

Under wartime S.A.T.C. rules, Pixley was eligible to play as a freshman on the 1918 Ohio State Buckeyes football team. As a sophomore in 1919, Pixley was selected by Dick Jemison as a first-team All-American. That year, he was also selected by Frank G. Menke as a first-team player on the 1919 All-Western college football team. He was also a consensus first-team player on the 1919 All-Big Ten Conference football team.

In 1920, Pixley attended Princeton University, but he did not play football that year.

Pixley returned to Ohio State in 1921. That fall, he was selected as a first-team All-American by Norman E. Brown of the Central Press Association. He was also selected by Collier's Weekly as a first-team player on the 1921 All-Western college football team. He was also a consensus first-team player on the 1921 All-Big Ten Conference football team.

As a senior, Pixley served as the captain of the 1922 Ohio State Buckeyes football team, the first Ohio State team to play in the newly completed Ohio Stadium. At the end of the 1922 season, he was selected as a first-team All-American by the New York Tribune and a second-team All-American by Frank G. Menke. He was also selected by some as a first-team player on the 1922 All-Big Ten Conference football team.

Pixley later became a part owner of WLOK radio in Lima, Ohio, and helped establish WLOK-TV (now known as WLIO). He also owned the Brightman Nut Manufacturing Company in Columbus. He died at University Hospital in Columbus in 1954 at age 54.
