= 1919 Ohio State Buckeyes football team =

American college football season

1919 Ohio State Buckeyes football
- Conference: Big Ten Conference, Ohio Athletic Conference
- Record: 6–1 (3–1 Big Ten, 2–0 OAC)
- Head coach: John Wilce (7th season)
- Home stadium: Ohio Field

1919 Big Ten Conference football standings
	Conf.					Overall
Team	W		L		T	W		L		T
Illinois $	6	–	1	–	0	6	–	1	–	0
Ohio State	3	–	1	–	0	6	–	1	–	0
Chicago	4	–	2	–	0	5	–	2	–	0
Wisconsin	3	–	2	–	0	5	–	2	–	0
Minnesota	3	–	2	–	0	4	–	2	–	1
Iowa	2	–	2	–	0	5	–	2	–	0
Michigan	1	–	4	–	0	3	–	4	–	0
Northwestern	1	–	4	–	0	2	–	5	–	0
Indiana	0	–	2	–	0	3	–	4	–	0
Purdue	0	–	3	–	0	2	–	4	–	1
$ – Conference champion

1919 Ohio Athletic Conference football standings
	Conf.					Overall
Team	W		L		T	W		L		T
Wooster $	7	–	0	–	0	8	–	0	–	0
Oberlin	5	–	0	–	0	7	–	1	–	0
Ohio State	2	–	0	–	0	6	–	1	–	0
Miami (OH)	7	–	1	–	0	7	–	1	–	0
Wittenberg	3	–	0	–	2	6	–	0	–	2
Akron	5	–	1	–	1	6	–	1	–	1
Denison	4	–	2	–	1	6	–	2	–	1
Western Reserve	3	–	3	–	0	5	–	4	–	0
Ohio Wesleyan	3	–	3	–	0	4	–	4	–	0
Case	2	–	4	–	1	3	–	6	–	1
Ohio	2	–	4	–	0	3	–	5	–	0
Cincinnati	1	–	3	–	1	3	–	4	–	1
Mount Union	0	–	5	–	0	1	–	7	–	0
Ohio Northern	0	–	6	–	0	1	–	8	–	0
Baldwin–Wallace	0	–	5	–	0	0	–	8	–	0
Kenyon	0	–	7	–	0	0	–	7	–	0
$ – Conference champion

The 1919 Ohio State Buckeyes football team represented Ohio State University in the 1919 college football season. The Buckeyes compiled a 6–1 record. Outscoring opponents 176–12, the Buckeyes scored their first 133 points in the first three games. This season represents the first time Ohio State beat Michigan in the rivalry.

Despite being in the Western Conference (Big Ten) together since 1913, this season had the first matchup between Ohio State and Purdue.

== Schedule ==
Date	Opponent	Site	Result	Attendance	Source
October 4	Ohio Wesleyan	Ohio Field; Columbus, OH	W 38–0		
October 11	Cincinnati	Ohio Field; Columbus, OH	W 46–0		
October 18	Kentucky*	Ohio Field; Columbus, OH	W 49–0		
October 25	at Michigan	Ferry Field; Ann Arbor, MI (rivalry)	W 13–3	30,000	
November 8	Purdue	Ohio Field; Columbus, OH	W 20–0		
November 15	at Wisconsin	Camp Randall Stadium; Madison, WI	W 3–0		
November 22	Illinois	Ohio Field; Columbus, OH (rivalry)	L 7–9	14,925	
*Non-conference game

== Coaching staff ==
- John Wilce, head coach, seventh year
