= Armant Legendre =

American football player and coach (1899–1963)

Biographical details
- Born: June 17, 1899; Bar Harbor, Maine, U.S.
- Died: November 1963 (aged 64)
- Education: Princeton University

Playing career

Football
- 1920: Princeton
- Position: End

Coaching career (HC unless noted)

Football
- 1921: Princeton (ends)

Accomplishments and honors

Awards
- First-team All-American (1920)

Armant Agricole Jean Baptiste Legendre (June 17, 1899 – November 1963) was an American football player. He played at the end position for the Princeton Tigers football team and was selected International News Service, Walter Eckersall and Football World magazine as a first-team player on the 1920 College Football All-America Team. He was picked as a second-team All-American by Walter Camp. He also played basketball for Princeton.

After graduating from Princeton, Legendre served as the ends coach for Princeton in 1921. He was of Creole heritage and later lived in New Orleans and worked as a coffee importer. In May 1931, he was appointed by President Herbert Hoover to the Brazilian Coffee Commission. His daughter Anne Armstrong was the United States Ambassador to the United Kingdom from 1976 to 1977.
