= 1919 Indiana Hoosiers football team =

American college football season

1919 Indiana Hoosiers football
- Conference: Big Ten Conference
- Record: 3–4 (0–2 Big Ten)
- Head coach: Ewald O. Stiehm (4th season)
- Captain: Roscoe Minton
- Home stadium: Jordan Field

1919 Big Ten Conference football standings
	Conf.					Overall
Team	W		L		T	W		L		T
Illinois $	6	–	1	–	0	6	–	1	–	0
Ohio State	3	–	1	–	0	6	–	1	–	0
Chicago	4	–	2	–	0	5	–	2	–	0
Wisconsin	3	–	2	–	0	5	–	2	–	0
Minnesota	3	–	2	–	0	4	–	2	–	1
Iowa	2	–	2	–	0	5	–	2	–	0
Michigan	1	–	4	–	0	3	–	4	–	0
Northwestern	1	–	4	–	0	2	–	5	–	0
Indiana	0	–	2	–	0	3	–	4	–	0
Purdue	0	–	3	–	0	2	–	4	–	1
$ – Conference champion

The 1919 Indiana Hoosiers football team was an American football team that represented the Indiana Hoosiers during the 1919 college football season In their fourth season under head coach Ewald O. Stiehm, the Hoosiers compiled a 3–4 record and finished in ninth place in the Big Ten Conference. They won games against Wabash (20–7), Kentucky (24–0), and Syracuse (12–6), and lost games to national champion Centre (12–3), Minnesota (20–6), Notre Dame (16–3), and Northwestern (3–2).

== Schedule ==
Date	Time	Opponent	Site	Result	Attendance	Source
September 27		Wabash*	Jordan Field; Bloomington, IN	W 20–7		
October 4		Centre*	Jordan Field; Bloomington, IN	L 3–12		
October 11		at Kentucky*	Stoll Field; Lexington, KY (rivalry)	W 24–0		
October 18	2:30 p.m.	vs. Minnesota	Washington Park; Indianapolis, IN	L 6–20	10,000	
November 1		vs. Notre Dame*	Washington Park; Indianapolis, IN	L 3–16	5,000	
November 15		at Northwestern	Northwestern Field; Evanston, IL	L 2–3		
November 22		Syracuse*	Jordan Field; Bloomington, IN	W 12–6	8,000	
*Non-conference game; All times are in Eastern time

== Personnel ==
=== Roster ===
Name	Position	Year
Hiatt	Right Halfback	
Bowser	Left Halfback	
Klink		
Lohrei	Center	
Taylor		
Ferguson		
Wiley	Left Guard	
Conrad		
Lucas		
James Hubert "Babe" Pierce	Left Fullback	
Mathys	Quarterback	
Kyle	Fullback	
Minton (C)	Left End	
Pope	Right End	
Mumby	Right Guard	
Donovan		
Ross		
Habbe		
Williams		
Risley		
Leonard	Right Tackle	
Bell		
Faust		
Wooten		
McCaw		

=== Staff ===
Name	Position
G. L. Rathbun	Assistant Coach
Corey	Assistant Coach
Ewald Ortwin Stiehm	Head Coach
Jesse Ferguson	Trainer
