= Glenn Devine =

American football player and coach (1895–1970)

Biographical details
- Born: October 22, 1895; Des Moines, Iowa, U.S.
- Died: July 1, 1970 (aged 74); Iowa City, Iowa, U.S.

Playing career
- 1919–1921: Iowa
- Position: Halfback

Coaching career (HC unless noted)
- 1922–1931: Parsons

Accomplishments and honors

Awards
- All-Big Ten (1920)

Glenn Daniel Devine (October 22, 1895 – July 1, 1970) was an American college football player and coach. A graduate of Des Moines West High School, Devine coached at Parsons College from 1922 to 1931. He was the brother of star football player Aubrey Devine. Devine died on July 1, 1970, at a hospital in Iowa City, Iowa.
