= 1919 All-Big Ten Conference football team =

American college football all-star team

The 1919 All-Big Ten Conference football team consists of American football players selected to the All-Big Ten Conference teams chosen by various selectors for the 1919 Big Ten Conference football season.

== All Big-Ten selections ==
=== Ends ===
- Lester Belding, Iowa (ECP, FM, INS, MM, VH, WE-1)
- Paul Meyers, Wisconsin (FM, INS, MDN, MM, VH, WE-1)
- Frank Weston, Wisconsin (ECP, WE-2)
- Chuck Carney, Illinois (MDN, WE-2)

=== Tackles ===
- Duke Slater, Iowa (ECP, FM, INS, MDN [guard], MM, VH, WE-1)
- Charles Higgins, Chicago (FM, INS, MDN, MM, VH, WE-1)
- Burt Ingwersen, Illinois (ECP, WE-2)
- Trygve Johnsen, Minnesota (MDN)
- Angus Goetz, Michigan (WE-2)

=== Guards ===
- Lloyd Pixley, Ohio State (ECP, FM, INS, MM, VH)
- Jack Depler, Illinois (ECP, INS, MM, VH [center], WE-1 [center])
- Clarence Applegran, Illinois (MDN, VH, WE-1)
- William G. McCaw, Indiana (FM, WE-1)
- Dean W. Trott, Ohio State (WE-2)
- Harry Hunzelman, Iowa (WE-2)

=== Centers ===
- Charles Carpenter, Wisconsin (ECP, FM, INS, MM, WE-2)
- Williams, Minnesota (MDN)

=== Quarterbacks ===
- Gaylord Stinchcomb, Ohio State (ECP, FM, MM, WE-1)
- Aubrey Devine, Iowa (INS, MDN, VH)
- Robert H. Fletcher, Illinois (WE-2)

=== Halfbacks ===
- Chic Harley, Ohio State (ECP, FM, INS, MDN, MM, VH)
- Arnold Oss, Minnesota (ECP, FM, INS, MDN, MM, VH, WE-1)
- Laurie Walquist, Illinois (WE-2)
- Russell S. Williams, Indiana (WE-2)

=== Fullbacks ===
- Jack Crangle, Illinois (FM, INS, MM)
- Edmond R. Ruben, Minnesota (MDN, VH)
- Guy Lohman, Iowa (WE-1)
- Frank R. Willaman, Ohio State (ECP, WE-2)

== Key ==
ECP = E. C. Patterson in Collier's Weekly

FM = Frank G. Menke

INS = International News Service selected by Luther A. Huston

MDN = Minneapolis Daily News by its sports editor, George A. Barton

MM = Malcolm McLaren in the Chicago Evening Post

VH = Victor Harris in the St. Paul Pioneer Press

WE = Walter Eckersall

Bold = consensus first-team selection by a majority of the selectors listed here

== See also ==
- 1919 College Football All-America Team
- 1919 All-Western college football team
