= Jim Robertson (American football) =

American college football player and coach

Playing career
- 1919–1921: Dartmouth
- Positions: Fullback, halfback

Coaching career (HC unless noted)
- 1922: Dartmouth (line)
- 1923: Oglethorpe

Head coaching record
- Overall: 4–6

Accomplishments and honors

Awards
- Third-team All-American (1919)

James E. Robertson was an American college football player and coach. He was an All-American college football player at Dartmouth College from 1919 to 1921, and head coach at Oglethorpe University in 1923.

== Biography ==
A native of Somerville, Massachusetts, Robertson attended Somerville High School, where he captained the school's baseball team. In 1914 and 1915, Robertson and his brother, Harry J. Robertson, played summer baseball for the Falmouth "Cottage Club" team in what is now the Cape Cod Baseball League. While Harry played catcher, Jim played first base, and was reportedly "a wonderful all-around ballplayer and a slugging hitter."

Robertson served in France during World War I, and played on an armed forces football squad in Saumur. Upon returning home from war, Robertson played college football for Dartmouth, where he captained the team in 1920 and 1921, was named an All-American in 1919, 1920 and 1921, and was referred to as "one of the supermen of the modern game." Robertson played fullback and halfback, and also served as the team's kicker.

In 1919, he made a 50-yard drop kick field goal at the Polo Grounds in Dartmouth's 9–0 victory over Cornell. Later that season, Robertson suffered a broken leg at the Polo Grounds in a game against Penn that ended his season. In 1920, Robertson led Dartmouth as the team made a rare cross-country trip to play Washington in a game dedicating the University of Washington's new Husky Stadium. Dartmouth prevailed by a score of 27–7. During the same season, Robertson captained his Dartmouth squad against his brother, who was captain of the Syracuse team. In 1921, Robertson suffered a leg injury late in the season, forcing him to move from halfback to lineman in his final game with Dartmouth. He reportedly opened "gaping holes" in the Georgia defense, and Dartmouth came out of Atlanta with a 7–0 victory.

After graduation, Robertson served as the line coach at Dartmouth in 1922. The following season, he took the reins as head football coach at Oglethorpe University. His 1923 Oglethorpe team posted a 4–6 record, and Robertson was succeeded the following season by his brother, who coached the team through 1933.

== Head coaching record ==
Year	Team	Overall	Conference	Standing	Bowl/playoffs
Oglethorpe Stormy Petrels (Southern Intercollegiate Athletic Association) (1923)
1923	Oglethorpe	4–6	3–3	10th	
Oglethorpe:		4–6	3–3		
Total:		4–6			
