= 1919 Michigan Wolverines football team =

American college football season

1919 Michigan Wolverines football
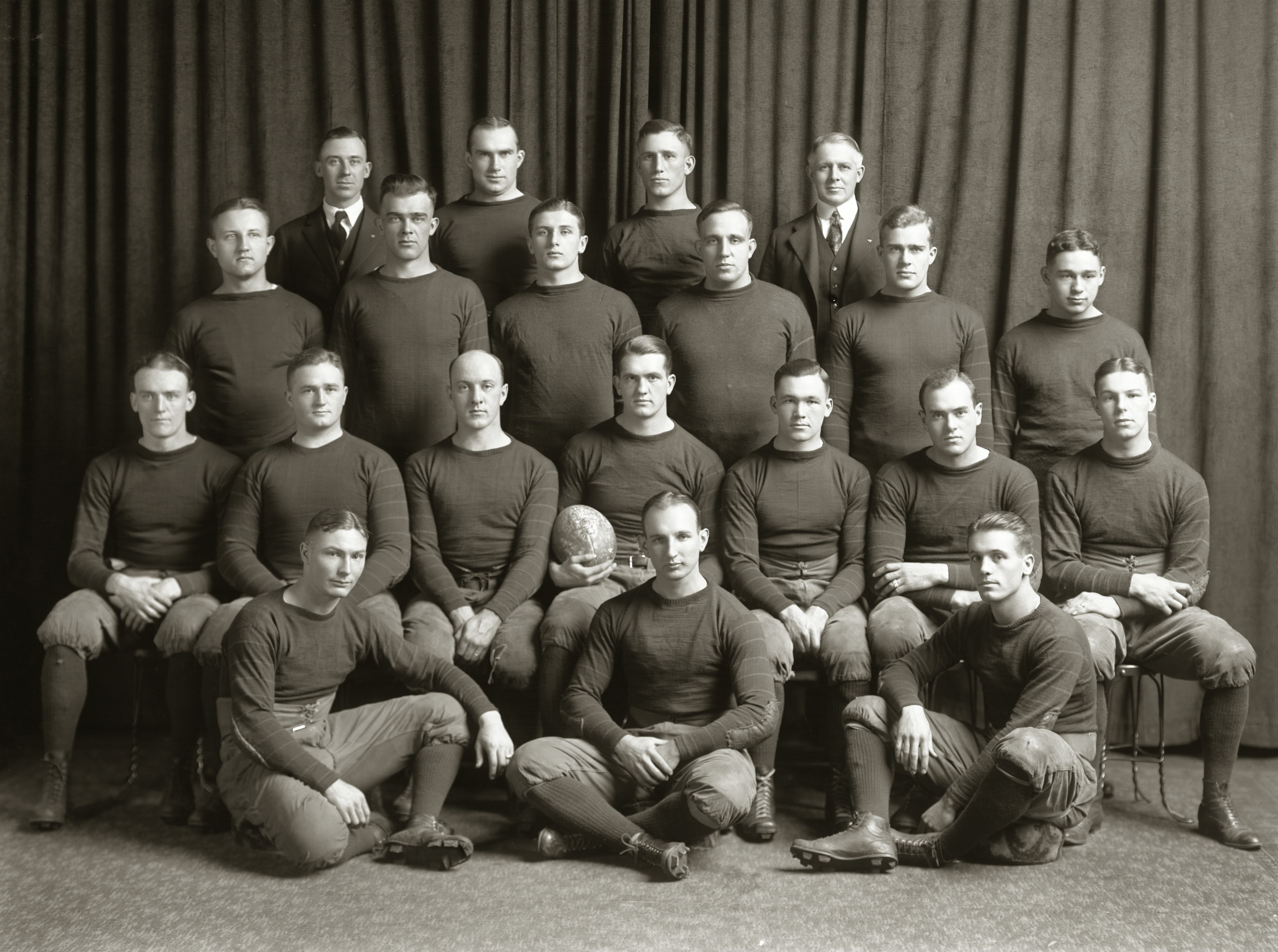
- Conference: Big Ten Conference
- Record: 3–4 (1–4 Big Ten)
- Head coach: Fielding H. Yost (19th season)
- Captain: Angus Goetz
- Home stadium: Ferry Field

Uniform
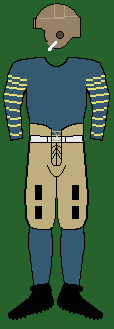

1919 Big Ten Conference football standings
	Conf.					Overall
Team	W		L		T	W		L		T
Illinois $	6	–	1	–	0	6	–	1	–	0
Ohio State	3	–	1	–	0	6	–	1	–	0
Chicago	4	–	2	–	0	5	–	2	–	0
Wisconsin	3	–	2	–	0	5	–	2	–	0
Minnesota	3	–	2	–	0	4	–	2	–	1
Iowa	2	–	2	–	0	5	–	2	–	0
Michigan	1	–	4	–	0	3	–	4	–	0
Northwestern	1	–	4	–	0	2	–	5	–	0
Indiana	0	–	2	–	0	3	–	4	–	0
Purdue	0	–	3	–	0	2	–	4	–	1
$ – Conference champion

The 1919 Michigan Wolverines football team was an American football team that represented the University of Michigan in the Big Ten Conference during the 1919 college football season. In its 19th season under head coach Fielding H. Yost, the Wolverines compiled a 3–4 record – the only losing season in Yost's 30-year career as a head football coach. The team was outscored by a total of 102 to 93 and finished in a tie for seventh place in the Big Ten. After winning three of four games to start the season, a stretch that included the Wolverines' first ever loss in the Michigan–Ohio State football rivalry, the team lost its final three games against Chicago, Illinois, and Minnesota.

Left tackle Angus Goetz was the team captain. Other notable players included quarterback Cliff Sparks, center/fullback Ernie Vick, halfback Archie Weston, left end Robert J. Dunne. Murray Van Wagoner, who later served as Governor of Michigan in the early 1940s, also started one game at left guard.

== Schedule ==
Date	Opponent	Site	Result	Attendance	Source
October 4	Case*	Ferry Field; Ann Arbor, MI	W 34–0	8,138	
October 18	Michigan Agricultural*	Ferry Field; Ann Arbor, MI (rivalry)	W 26–0	21,000	
October 25	Ohio State	Ferry Field; Ann Arbor, MI (rivalry)	L 3–13	30,000	
November 1	Northwestern	Ferry Field; Ann Arbor, MI (rivalry)	W 16–13	12,000	
November 8	at Chicago	Stagg Field; Chicago, IL (rivalry)	L 0–13	24,000	
November 15	at Illinois	Illinois Field; Champaign, IL (rivalry)	L 7–29	9,622–14,000	
November 22	Minnesota^{†}	Ferry Field; Ann Arbor, MI (Little Brown Jug)	L 7–34	30,000	
*Non-conference game; ^{†}Homecoming

== Players ==
=== Letter winners ===
- John C. Cary - end (Grand Rapids, Michigan)
- Elmer W. Cress - end (Grand Rapids, Michigan)
- William R. Cruse - started 2 games at left halfback, 2 games at right halfback, 2 games at fullback (Detroit, Michigan)
- Frank Culver - started 3 games at center, 1 game at left guard (Detroit, Michigan)
- Frank T. Czysz - started 1 game at right tackle (Dunkirk, New York)
- Roland Glenn Dunn - started 3 games at right tackle, 1 game at right guard (Muskegon Heights, Michigan)
- Robert J. Dunne - started 6 games at left end (Chicago, Illinois)
- Donald A. Finkbeiner - tackle (Perrysburg, Ohio)
- William Fortune - started 3 games at left guard (Springfield, Illinois)
- Gerald W. Froemke - started 1 game at right halfback (Sheldon, North Dakota)
- Angus Goetz - started 7 games at left tackle (Sault Ste. Marie, Michigan)
- J. Vinton Hammels - tackle (Glendale, Arizona)
- William P. Henderson - started 1 game at right end (Detroit, Michigan)
- Roy W. Johnson - started 2 games at center, 1 game at left guard (Grand Rapids, Michigan)
- Kenneth T. Knode - started 1 game at quarterback, 1 game at right halfback (Martinsburg, West Virginia)
- Alvin Loucks - guard (Grand Rapids, Michigan)
- Willard L. Peach - started 2 games at right end, 1 game at left end, 1 game at right tackle (Fremont, Ohio)
- Harold Rye - started 3 games at right end (Sault Ste. Marie, Michigan)
- Cliff Sparks - started 6 games at quarterback, 1 game at right halfback (Jackson, Michigan)
- Ernie Vick - started 4 games at fullback, 2 games at center (Toledo, Ohio)
- Archie Weston - started 2 games at right halfback (Sault Ste. Marie, Michigan)
- Hugh Wilson - started 4 games at right guard, 2 games at right tackle, 1 game at left guard (Grand Rapids, Michigan)

=== Non-letter winners ===
- John M. Barnes - halfback (Washington, D.C.)
- James V. Campbell - tackle (Ann Arbor, Michigan)
- Charles Eades - started 1 game at fullback (Conneaut, Ohio)
- Robert E. Hamilton - center (Erie, Pennsylvania)
- Earle Magrath - started 1 game at right end (Oak Park, Illinois)
- Barry Stuart - fullback (Grand Rapids, Michigan)
- Theodore Timchac - tackle (Saginaw, Michigan)
- Murray Van Wagoner - started 1 game at left guard (Pontiac, Michigan)
- Arthur A. Weadock - quarterback (Saginaw, Michigan)
- Charles O. Wilson - fullback (Muskegon, Michigan)

== Awards and honors ==
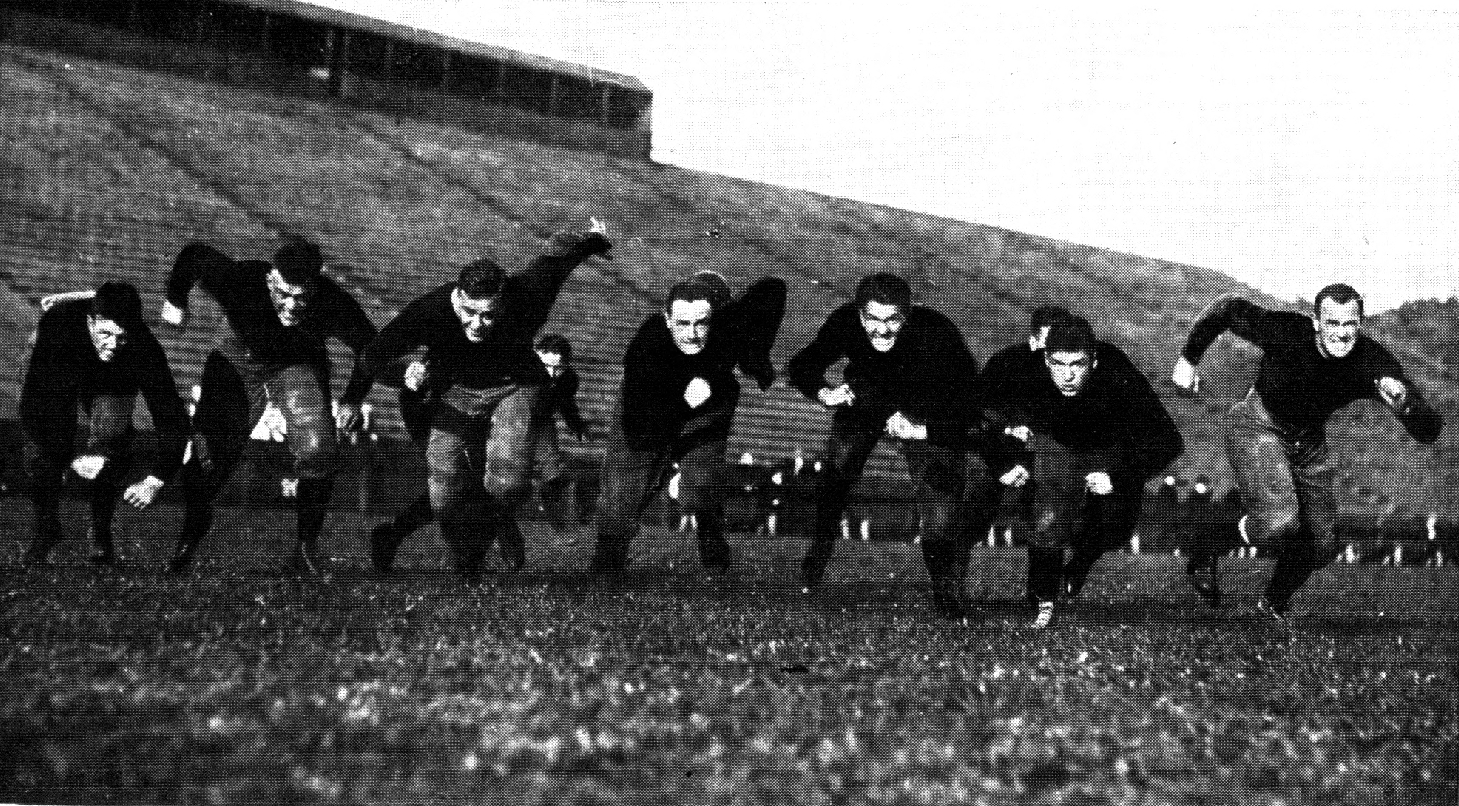
1919 players from 1920 Michiganensian with captions, "Lookout Ahead!"

- Captain: Angus Goetz
- All-Conference: Ernie Vick

== Coaching staff ==
- Head coach: Fielding H. Yost
- Assistant coaches: Prentiss Douglass, Ernest Allmendinger, Carl Lundgren, Edwin Mather
- Manager: Leland N. Scofield
