= 1919 Northwestern Purple football team =

American college football season

1919 Northwestern Purple football
- Conference: Big Ten Conference
- Record: 2–5 (1–4 Big Ten)
- Head coach: Charlie Bachman (1st season)
- Captain: Robert Koehler
- Home stadium: Northwestern Field

1919 Big Ten Conference football standings
| | Conf. | | | | | Overall |
| Team | W | | L | | T | W | | L | | T |
|---|---|---|---|---|---|---|---|---|---|---|
| Illinois $ | 6 | – | 1 | – | 0 | 6 | – | 1 | – | 0 |
| Ohio State | 3 | – | 1 | – | 0 | 6 | – | 1 | – | 0 |
| Chicago | 4 | – | 2 | – | 0 | 5 | – | 2 | – | 0 |
| Wisconsin | 3 | – | 2 | – | 0 | 5 | – | 2 | – | 0 |
| Minnesota | 3 | – | 2 | – | 0 | 4 | – | 2 | – | 1 |
| Iowa | 2 | – | 2 | – | 0 | 5 | – | 2 | – | 0 |
| Michigan | 1 | – | 4 | – | 0 | 3 | – | 4 | – | 0 |
| Northwestern | 1 | – | 4 | – | 0 | 2 | – | 5 | – | 0 |
| Indiana | 0 | – | 2 | – | 0 | 3 | – | 4 | – | 0 |
| Purdue | 0 | – | 3 | – | 0 | 2 | – | 4 | – | 1 |
$ – Conference champion

The 1919 Northwestern Purple team represented Northwestern University during the 1919 college football season. In their first and only year under head coach Charlie Bachman, the Purple compiled a 2–5 record (1–4 against Big Ten Conference opponents) and finished in eighth place in the Big Ten Conference.

== Schedule ==
| Date | Opponent | Site | Result | Attendance | Source |
|---|---|---|---|---|---|
| October 11 | DePauw* | Northwestern Field; Evanston, IL | W 20–0 | | |
| October 18 | Wisconsin | Northwestern Field; Evanston, IL | L 6–10 | 15,000 | |
| October 25 | at Chicago | Stagg Field; Chicago, IL | L 0–41 | 20,000 | |
| November 1 | at Michigan | Ferry Field; Ann Arbor, MI (rivalry) | L 13–16 | 12,000 | |
| November 8 | Iowa | Northwestern Field; Evanston, IL | L 7–14 | | |
| November 15 | Indiana | Northwestern Field; Evanston, IL | W 3–2 | | |
| November 22 | vs. Rutgers* | Harrison Field; Harrison, NJ | L 0–28 | 15,000 | |
*Non-conference game
