= 1919 Iowa Hawkeyes football team =

American college football season

1919 Iowa Hawkeyes football
- Conference: Big Ten Conference
- Record: 5–2 (2–2 Big Ten)
- Head coach: Howard Jones (4th season)
- Offensive scheme: Single-wing
- Captain: Fred Lohman
- Home stadium: Iowa Field

Uniform
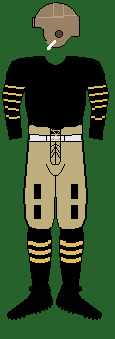

1919 Big Ten Conference football standings
	Conf.					Overall
Team	W		L		T	W		L		T
Illinois $	6	–	1	–	0	6	–	1	–	0
Ohio State	3	–	1	–	0	6	–	1	–	0
Chicago	4	–	2	–	0	5	–	2	–	0
Wisconsin	3	–	2	–	0	5	–	2	–	0
Minnesota	3	–	2	–	0	4	–	2	–	1
Iowa	2	–	2	–	0	5	–	2	–	0
Michigan	1	–	4	–	0	3	–	4	–	0
Northwestern	1	–	4	–	0	2	–	5	–	0
Indiana	0	–	2	–	0	3	–	4	–	0
Purdue	0	–	3	–	0	2	–	4	–	1
$ – Conference champion

The 1919 Iowa Hawkeyes football team was an American football team that represented the University of Iowa as a member of the Big Ten Conference during the 1919 Big Ten football season. In their fourth year under head coach Howard Jones, the Hawkeyes compiled a 5–2 record (2–2 in conference games), finished in sixth place in the Big Ten, and outscored opponents by a total of 90 to 44.

The team played its home games at Iowa Field in Iowa City, Iowa.

== Schedule ==
Date	Opponent	Site	Result	Attendance	Source
October 4	Nebraska*	Iowa Field; Iowa City, IA (rivalry)	W 18–0		
October 18	at Illinois	Illinois Field; Champaign, IL	L 7–9	6,470	
October 25	at Minnesota	Northrop Field; Minneapolis, MN (rivalry)	W 9–6	12,000	
November 1	South Dakota*	Iowa Field; Iowa City, IA	W 26–13		
November 8	Northwestern	Northwestern Field; Evanston, IL	W 14–7		
November 15	at Chicago	Stagg Field; Chicago, IL	L 6–9		
November 22	Iowa State*^{†}	Iowa Field; Iowa City, IA (rivalry)	W 10–0		
*Non-conference game; ^{†}Homecoming
