= George Hartong =

American football player (1896–1973)

Profile
- Positions: Guard, tackle, center

Personal information
- Born: July 18, 1896; Joliet, Illinois, U.S.
- Died: August 1, 1973 (aged 77); Hinsdale, Illinois, U.S.
- Listed height: 6 ft 0 in (1.83 m)
- Listed weight: 210 lb (95 kg)

Career information
- High school: Joliet Township (IL)
- College: Chicago

Career history
- Hammond Pros (1921); Racine Legion (1923); Chicago Cardinals (1924)

Career NFL statistics
- Games: 21
- Stats at Pro Football Reference

George Howard Hartong (July 18, 1896 – August 1973) was an American football player. A native of Joliet, Illinois, he played college football at the University of Chicago and professional football as a guard, tackle, and center for the Hammond Pros, Racine Legion, and Chicago Cardinals in the National Football League (NFL). He appeared in 21 NFL games, 18 as a starter, from 1921 to 1924.

Hartong was described as a "fast, brainy, and experienced lineman".
