= 1919 Chicago Maroons football team =

American college football season

1919 Chicago Maroons football
- Conference: Big Ten Conference
- Record: 5–2 (4–2 Big Ten)
- Head coach: Amos Alonzo Stagg (28th season)
- Home stadium: Stagg Field

1919 Big Ten Conference football standings
	Conf.					Overall
Team	W		L		T	W		L		T
Illinois $	6	–	1	–	0	6	–	1	–	0
Ohio State	3	–	1	–	0	6	–	1	–	0
Chicago	4	–	2	–	0	5	–	2	–	0
Wisconsin	3	–	2	–	0	5	–	2	–	0
Minnesota	3	–	2	–	0	4	–	2	–	1
Iowa	2	–	2	–	0	5	–	2	–	0
Michigan	1	–	4	–	0	3	–	4	–	0
Northwestern	1	–	4	–	0	2	–	5	–	0
Indiana	0	–	2	–	0	3	–	4	–	0
Purdue	0	–	3	–	0	2	–	4	–	1
$ – Conference champion

The 1919 Chicago Maroons football team was an American football team that represented the University of Chicago during the 1919 college football season. In their 28th season under head coach Amos Alonzo Stagg, the Maroons compiled a 5–2 record, finished in third place in the Big Ten Conference, and outscored their opponents by a combined total of 205 to 26.

== Schedule ==
Date	Opponent	Site	Result	Attendance	Source
October 11	Great Lakes Navy*	Stagg Field; Chicago, IL	W 123–0		
October 18	Purdue	Stagg Field; Chicago, IL (rivalry)	W 16–0		
October 25	Northwestern	Stagg Field; Chicago, IL	W 41–0	20,000	
November 1	at Illinois	Illinois Field; Champaign, IL	L 0–10	16,000–17,000	
November 8	Michigan	Stagg Field; Chicago, IL (rivalry)	W 13–0	24,000	
November 15	Iowa	Stagg Field; Chicago, IL	W 9–6		
November 22	Wisconsin	Stagg Field; Chicago, IL	L 3–10		
*Non-conference game
