= Joseph DuMoe =

American football coach (1895–1959)

- DuMoe with the Rochester Jeffersons in 1921

Biographical details
- Born: July 30, 1895; Nickerson, Minnesota, U.S.
- Died: February 23, 1959 (aged 63); Pasadena, California, U.S.

Playing career
- 1915–1916: Syracuse
- 1917: Fordham
- 1919: Lafayette
- 1920–1921: Rochester Jeffersons
- Position: End

Coaching career (HC unless noted)
- 1920–1921: Fordham

Head coaching record
- Overall: 8–6–2

Accomplishments and honors

Awards
- Second-team All-American (1919)

Joseph Thomas DuMoe (July 30, 1895 – February 23, 1959) was an American football player and coach. He served as the head football coach at Fordham University from 1920 to 1921, compiling a record of 8–6–2. Dumoe played college football at Syracuse University, Fordham, and Lafayette College. He played professionally in the American Professional Football Association (APFA)—now known as National Football League (NFL)–with the Rochester Jeffersons in 1920 and 1921.

DuMoe later worked in Los Angeles as superintendent of brokerage sales for Occidental Life Insurance Company of California. He died on February 23, 1959, at a hospital in Pasadena, California following a long illness.

== Head coaching record ==
Year	Team	Overall	Conference	Standing	Bowl/playoffs
Fordham Maroon (Independent) (1920–1921)
1920	Fordham	4–3			
1921	Fordham	4–3–2			
Fordham:		8–6–2			
Total:		8–6–2			
