= 1919 Purdue Boilermakers football team =

American college football season

1919 Purdue Boilermakers football
- Conference: Big Ten Conference
- Record: 2–4–1 (0–3 Big Ten)
- Head coach: A. G. Scanlon (2nd season)
- Captain: Ken W. Huffine
- Home stadium: Stuart Field

1919 Big Ten Conference football standings
	Conf.					Overall
Team	W		L		T	W		L		T
Illinois $	6	–	1	–	0	6	–	1	–	0
Ohio State	3	–	1	–	0	6	–	1	–	0
Chicago	4	–	2	–	0	5	–	2	–	0
Wisconsin	3	–	2	–	0	5	–	2	–	0
Minnesota	3	–	2	–	0	4	–	2	–	1
Iowa	2	–	2	–	0	5	–	2	–	0
Michigan	1	–	4	–	0	3	–	4	–	0
Northwestern	1	–	4	–	0	2	–	5	–	0
Indiana	0	–	2	–	0	3	–	4	–	0
Purdue	0	–	3	–	0	2	–	4	–	1
$ – Conference champion

The 1919 Purdue Boilermakers football team was an American football team that represented Purdue University during the 1919 college football season. In their second season under head coach A. G. Scanlon, the Boilermakers compiled a 2–4–1 record, finished in last place in the Big Ten Conference with an 0–3 record against conference opponents, and were outscored by their opponents by a total of 104 to 71. Ken W. Huffine was the team captain.

Despite being in the Western Conference (Big Ten) together since 1913, this season had the first matchup between Purdue and Ohio State.

== Schedule ==
Date	Opponent	Site	Result	Attendance	Source
October 4	Franklin*	Stuart Field; West Lafayette, IN	T 14–14		
October 11	Illinois	Stuart Field; West Lafayette, IN (rivalry)	L 7–14	4,000	
October 18	at Chicago	Stagg Field; Chicago, IL (rivalry)	L 0–16		
November 1	Michigan Agricultural	Stuart Field; West Lafayette, IN	W 13–7		
November 8	at Ohio State	Ohio Field; Columbus, OH	L 0–20		
November 17	DePauw*	Stuart Field; West Lafayette, IN	W 24–0		
November 22	Notre Dame	Stuart Field; West Lafayette, IN (rivalry)	L 13–33		
*Non-conference game

== Roster ==
- Ferdinand Birk, T
- Paul Church, HB
- Cecil Cooley, G
- J. Daly
- Dwight Grigsby, G
- G. W. Hanna, LH
- Ken Huffine, FB
- Paul Macklin, QB
- John Meeker, RH
- R. F. Miller, T
- Russ Mitchell, C
- J. H. Quast, E
- M. M. Smith, E
- C. C. Stanwood, C
- Earl Wagner
