= Tom Woods (American football) =

American football player (1896–1978)

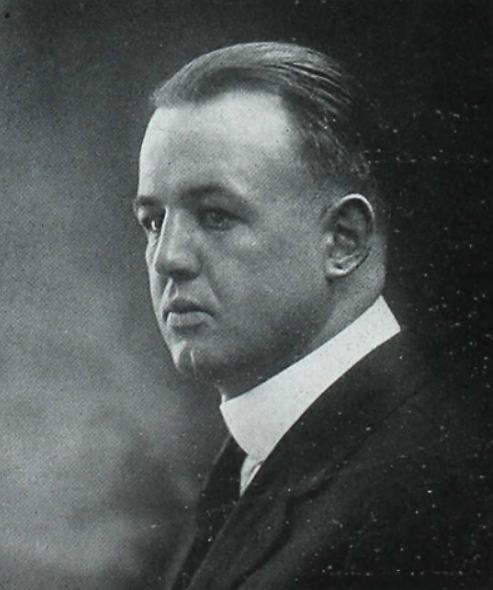
- Woods from the 1920 Harvard yearbook

Profile
- Position: Guard

Personal information
- Born: November 10, 1896; Boston, Massachusetts, U.S.
- Died: January 8, 1978 (aged 81); Boston, Massachusetts, U.S.

Career information
- College: Harvard College

Career history
- 1919–1920: Harvard Crimson

Awards and highlights
- National champion (1919); Consensus All-American (1920)

Thomas Smith Woods, Jr. (November 10, 1896 – January 8, 1978) was an American football player. He played for the Harvard Crimson football team and was selected as a consensus first-team All-American in 1920.

Woods was born in Boston, Massachusetts, and graduated from Brookline High School. He then attended Harvard College. However, his college education was interrupted by service in the United States Navy during World War I. He enlisted in April 1917, was commissioned as an ensign, and served on the U.S.S. Parthenia, U.S.S. Long Island, and U.S.S. Cleveland.

After the war, Woods returned to Harvard where he played college football at the guard position during the 1919 and 1920 seasons for the Harvard Crimson. He was a consensus first-team selection on the 1920 College Football All-America Team. While at Harvard, Woods was also a member of the track team, Institute of 1770, Delta Kappa Epsilon, Fox Club, Phoenix Club, Hasty Pudding Club, Glee Club, Varsity Club, Iota Club, and Brookline High School Club. Woods died on January 8, 1978, and was buried at Chestnut Hill, Massachusetts.
