= Belford West =

American football player (1896–1973)

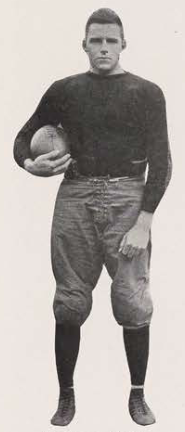
- West at Colgate University

Profile
- Position: Tackle

Personal information
- Born: May 7, 1896; Hamilton, New York, U.S.
- Died: September 11, 1973 (aged 77); Cooperstown, New York, U.S.
- Listed height: 6 ft 2 in (1.88 m)
- Listed weight: 195 lb (88 kg)

Career information
- High school: Phillips Andover, Peddie School
- College: Colgate (1914–1916, 1919)

Career history
- Canton Bulldogs (1921)

Awards and highlights
- First-team All-Pro (1921); 2× Consensus All-America (1916, 1919); First-team All-Service (1917)
- Stats at Pro Football Reference
- College Football Hall of Fame

David Belford West (May 7, 1896 – September 11, 1973) was an American football player. Best known for playing college football for the Colgate Raiders, he was twice a consensus All-America selection and was elected to the College Football Hall of Fame in 1954. He also played professionally for the Canton Bulldogs.

== Biography ==
West prepared for college by attending Phillips Andover in Massachusetts and Peddie School in New Jersey. He then attended Colgate University, located in his hometown of Hamilton, New York. He played four seasons of college football for Colgate as a tackle; 1914, 1915, 1916, and 1919. West's college career was interrupted by World War I. He served in the United States Army as a lieutenant from August 1917 to May 1919. He played football while in the military, and was a selection to the 1917 All-Service football team while at Fort Dix.

At Colgate, West was also member of Delta Kappa Epsilon, a member of the varsity basketball team, and a member of the varsity baseball team. In football, he was a consensus selection to the All-America Team for 1916 and 1919, and served as team captain for the 1919 Colgate football team. West was also a placekicker, and in 1919 made a 52-yard field goal against Syracuse. West was inducted to the College Football Hall of Fame in 1954 and to Colgate's athletic hall of honor in 1979. Reflecting on West's college career in 1928, John Heisman wrote, "His co-ordination was complete, his courage supreme, his sportsmanship incontestable."

West played professionally for one season—as a member of the 1921 Canton Bulldogs, he appeared in 10 games (nine starts) at left tackle; he also kicked one field goal and four extra points. The Buffalo Evening News listed West in their selection of an all-star team, which is now regarded as the 1921 All-Pro Team.

Entering business, West did not play professionally after 1921. Most of his business career was based in Buffalo, New York, with the city's Better Business Bureau starting in 1925, and then with a local machinery manufacturer from 1937 until his retirement in 1960. West died in September 1973 while undergoing abdominal surgery in Cooperstown, New York; he was survived by his wife and a daughter.
