= 1919 All-America college football team =

Official list of the best college football players of 1919

The 1919 All-America college football team is composed of college football players who were selected as All-Americans by various organizations and writers that chose All-America college football teams in 1919. The two selectors recognized by the NCAA as "official" for the 1919 season are (1) Walter Camp (WC), whose selections were published in Collier's Weekly; and (2) the Frank Menke syndicate (MS).

== Consensus All-Americans ==
For the year 1919, the NCAA recognizes only two selectors as "official" for purposes of its consensus determinations. The following chart identifies the NCAA-recognized consensus All-Americans and displays which first-team designations they received.

Name	Position	School	Official	Other	Total
Bob Higgins	End	Penn State	MS, WC	DJ, RE	4/4
Wilbur Henry	Tackle	Wash. & Jeff.	MS, WC	DJ, RE	4/4
Chic Harley	Halfback	Ohio State	MS, WC	DJ, RE	4/4
Eddie Casey	Halfback	Harvard	MS, WC	DJ, RE	4/4
Ira Rodgers	Fullback	West Virginia	MS, WC	DJ, RE	4/4
Belford West	Tackle	Colgate	MS, WC	RE	3/4
Heinie Miller	End	Penn	WC	DJ	2/4
Doc Alexander	Guard	Syracuse	MS, WC	--	2/4
Swede Youngstrom	Guard	Dartmouth	MS, WC	--	2/4
Red Weaver	Center	Centre	WC	DJ	2/4
Benny Boynton	Quarterback	Williams	MS	DJ	2/4
Charles Carpenter	Center	Wisconsin	MS	--	1/4
Bo McMillin	Quarterback	Centre	WC	--	1/4

== All-Americans of 1919 ==
=== Ends ===
- Bob Higgins, Penn State (College Football Hall of Fame) (WC-1; MS; RE-1; DJ-1)
- Heinie Miller, Penn (WC-1; DJ-1)
- Lester Belding, Iowa (MS)
- Frank Weston, Wisconsin (WC-2)
- Joseph DuMoe, Lafayette (WC-2)
- Earl Blaik, Army (WC-3)
- Red Roberts, Centre (WC-3)
- Dick Reichle, Illinois (RE-1)
- Bernard Kirk, Notre Dame (DJ-2)
- Paul Meyers, Wisconsin (DJ-2)

=== Tackles ===
Pete Henry.

- Pete Henry, Washington & Jefferson (College and Pro Football Hall of Fame) (WC-1; MS; RE-1 [g]; DJ-1)
- Belford West, Colgate (College Football Hall of Fame) (WC-1; MS; RE-1; DJ-2)
- William Grimm, Washington (WC-2)
- Burt Ingwersen, Illinois (WC-2)
- Duke Slater, Iowa (WC-3)
- Josh Cody, Vanderbilt (College Football Hall of Fame) (WC-3; DJ-1)
- Hoffman, Ohio (RE-1)
- Joseph Murphy, Dartmouth (DJ-2)

=== Guards ===
- Doc Alexander, Syracuse (College Football Hall of Fame) (WC-1; MS; DJ-2)
- Swede Youngstrom, Dartmouth (WC-1; MS; DJ-2)
- Fred Denfeld, Navy (WC-2)
- Jack Depler, Illinois (WC-2)
- Charles Arthur Clark, Harvard (WC-3)
- Lloyd Pixley, Ohio State (WC-3; DJ-1)
- Robert Sedgwick, Harvard (RE-1)
- Pup Phillips, Georgia Tech (DJ-1)

=== Centers ===
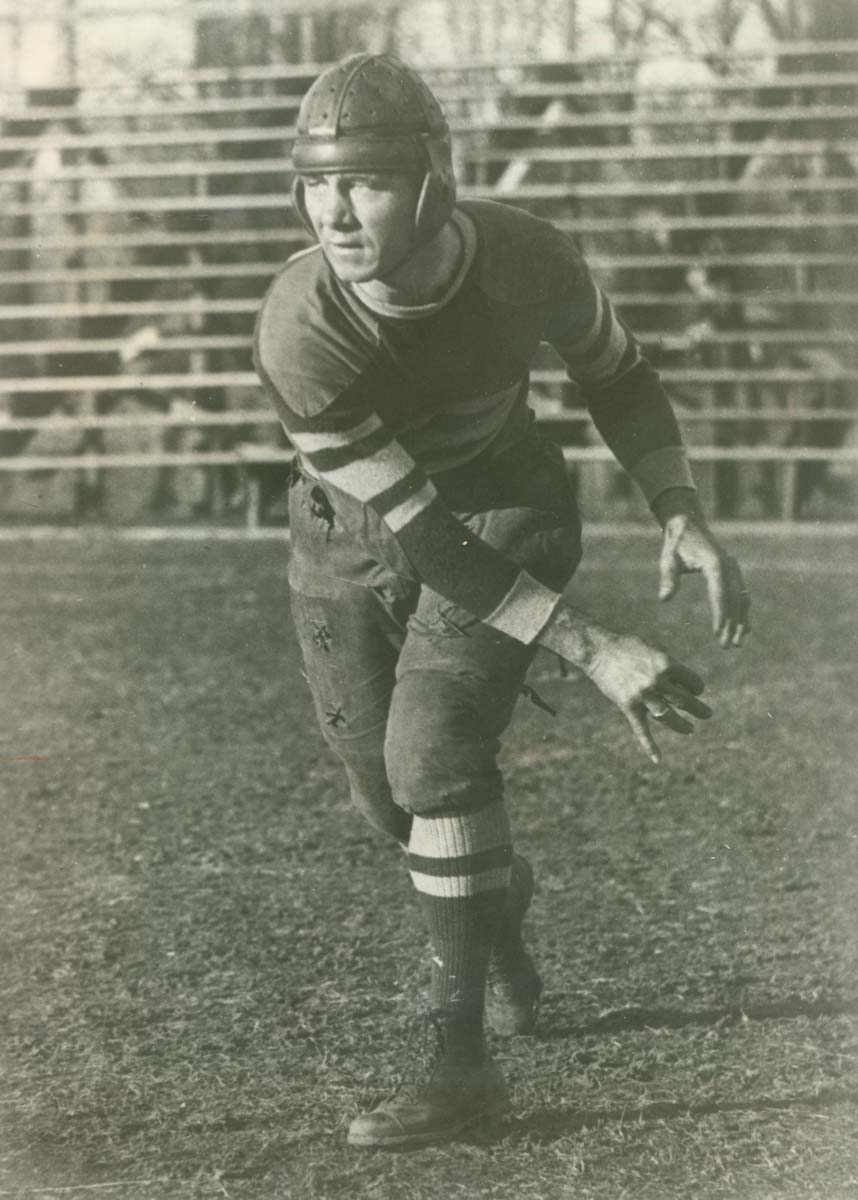
Bo McMillin.

- Red Weaver, Centre (WC-1; DJ-1)
- Charles Carpenter, Wisconsin (MS)
- Russ Bailey, West Virginia (WC-2)
- Tim Callahan, Yale (WC-3)
- Bum Day, Georgia (DJ-2)
- Harry J. Robertson, Syracuse (RE-1)

=== Quarterbacks ===
- Bo McMillin, Centre (College Football Hall of Fame) (WC-1; DJ-2)
- John Strubing, Princeton (WC-2)
- Benny Boynton, Williams (College Football Hall of Fame) (WC-3; MS; DJ-1)
- James Bradshaw, Nevada (RE-1)

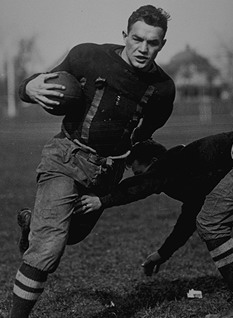
Chic Harley.

=== Halfbacks ===
- Chic Harley, Ohio State (College Football Hall of Fame) (WC-1; MS; DJ-1)
- Eddie Casey, Harvard (College Football Hall of Fame) (WC-1; MS; RE-1; DJ-1)
- Murray Trimble, Princeton (WC-2; RE-1)
- Arnold Oss, Minnesota (WC-2)
- Bill Steers, Oregon (WC-3)
- Hank Gillo, Colgate (WC-3; DJ-2)
- Bodie Weldon, Lafayette (DJ-2)

=== Fullbacks ===
- Ira Rodgers, West Virginia (College Football Hall of Fame) (WC-1; MS; RE-1; DJ-1)
- Jim Braden, Yale (WC-2)
- Jim Robertson, Dartmouth (WC-3; DJ-2)

== Key ==
Bold = Consensus All-American

- 1 – First-team selection
- 2 – Second-team selection
- 3 – Third-team selection

=== Official selectors ===
- WC = Walter Camp
- MS = Frank Menke Syndicate, by Frank G. Menke

=== Other selectors ===
- RE = Reno Evening Gazette, selected by "W.P. Hahn, football expert of national note who is now located in Reno"
- DJ = Dick Jemison

== See also ==
- 1919 All-Big Ten Conference football team
- 1919 All-Eastern football team
- 1919 All-Pacific Coast football team
- 1919 All-Southern college football team
- 1919 All-Western college football team
