= A. G. Scanlon =

American football player and coach (1890–1945)

A. G. Scanlan
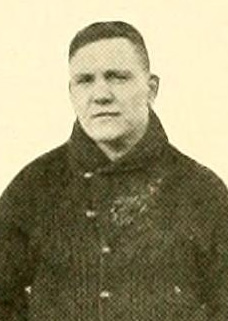

Biographical details
- Born: August 16, 1890; Chicago, Illinois, U.S.
- Died: July 8, 1945 (aged 54); Chicago, Illinois, U.S.

Playing career
- 1912–1913: Chicago

Coaching career (HC unless noted)
- 1918–1920: Purdue

Head coaching record
- Overall: 7–12–1

Accomplishments and honors

Championships
- 1 Big Ten (1918)

Arthur Garrett "Butch" Scanlan (August 16, 1890 – July 8, 1945) was an American football coach. He served as the head football coach at Purdue University from 1918 to 1920, compiling a record of 7–12–1. Scanlon played college football at the University of Chicago from 1912 to 1913. After leaving Purdue, he coached football at Hyde Park High School in Chicago. He died of a heart attack on July 8, 1945, in Chicago.

== Head coaching record ==
Year	Team	Overall	Conference	Standing	Bowl/playoffs
Purdue Boilermakers (Big Ten Conference) (1918–1920)
1918	Purdue	3–3	1–0	T–1st	
1919	Purdue	2–4–1	0–3	10th	
1920	Purdue	2–5	0–4	T–9th	
Purdue:		7–12–1	1–7		
Total:		7–12–1			
National championship Conference title Conference division title or championship game berth
