= 1919 Minnesota Golden Gophers football team =

American college football season

1919 Minnesota Golden Gophers football
- Conference: Big Ten Conference
- Record: 4–2–1 (3–2 Big Ten)
- Head coach: Henry L. Williams (20th season)
- Captain: Ernest Lampi
- Home stadium: Northrop Field

1919 Big Ten Conference football standings
	Conf.					Overall
Team	W		L		T	W		L		T
Illinois $	6	–	1	–	0	6	–	1	–	0
Ohio State	3	–	1	–	0	6	–	1	–	0
Chicago	4	–	2	–	0	5	–	2	–	0
Wisconsin	3	–	2	–	0	5	–	2	–	0
Minnesota	3	–	2	–	0	4	–	2	–	1
Iowa	2	–	2	–	0	5	–	2	–	0
Michigan	1	–	4	–	0	3	–	4	–	0
Northwestern	1	–	4	–	0	2	–	5	–	0
Indiana	0	–	2	–	0	3	–	4	–	0
Purdue	0	–	3	–	0	2	–	4	–	1
$ – Conference champion

The 1919 Minnesota Golden Gophers football team represented the University of Minnesota in the 1919 college football season. In their 20th year under head coach Henry L. Williams, the Golden Gophers compiled a 4–2–1 record (3–2 against Big Ten Conference opponents). The 1919 team finished in a tie for fourth place in the Big Ten. Halfback Arnold Oss was named All-Big Ten first team.

== Schedule ==
Date	Time	Opponent	Site	Result	Attendance	Source
October 4		North Dakota*	Northrop Field; Minneapolis, MN	W 39–0	7,500	
October 11		Nebraska*	Northrop Field; Minneapolis, MN (rivalry)	T 6–6	7,000	
October 18	1:30 p.m.	vs. Indiana	Washington Park; Indianapolis, IN	W 20–6	10,000	
October 25		Iowa	Northrop Field; Minneapolis, MN (rivalry)	L 6–9	12,000	
November 1		at Wisconsin	Camp Randall Stadium; Madison, WI (rivalry)	W 19–7	20,000	
November 8	3:30 p.m.	Illinois^{†}	Northrop Field; Minneapolis, MN	L 6–10	25,000	
November 22		at Michigan	Ferry Field; Ann Arbor, MI (Little Brown Jug)	W 34–7	30,000	
*Non-conference game; ^{†}Homecoming; All times are in Central time
