= Lester Belding =

American football player and coach (1900–1965)

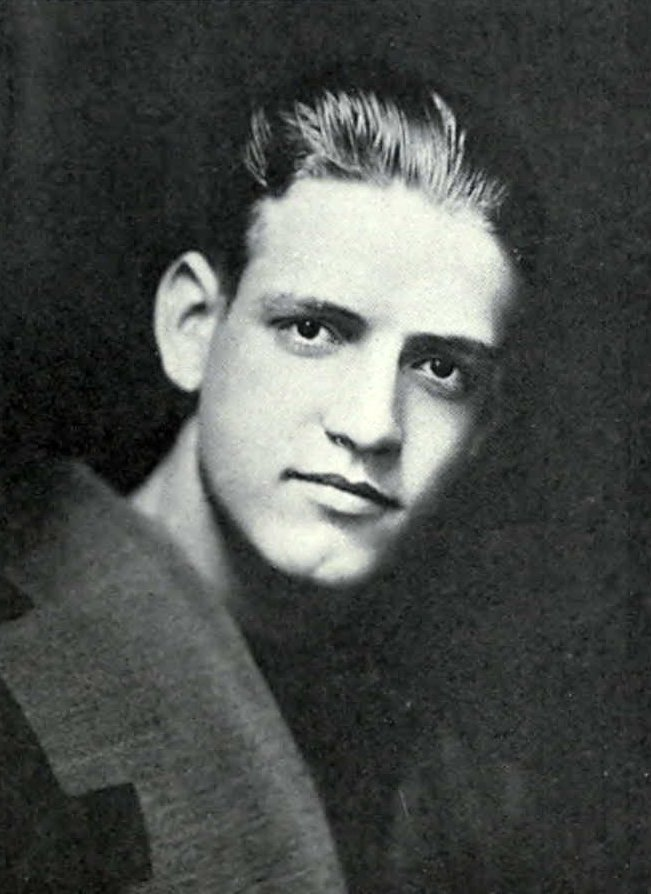
- Belding in 1923

Biographical details
- Born: December 5, 1900; Mason City, Iowa, U.S.
- Died: May 26, 1965 (aged 64); Naperville, Illinois, U.S.

Playing career

Football
- 1919–1921: Iowa
- 1925: Rock Island Independents
- Position: End

Coaching career (HC unless noted)

Football
- 1927: North Carolina (freshmen)
- 1934–1942: Dakota Wesleyan
- 1945: North Central (IL)

Basketball
- 1934–1943: Dakota Wesleyan
- 1944–1945: Dakota Wesleyan
- 1946–1948: North Central (IL)

Track and field
- 1945–1965: North Central (IL)

Administrative career (AD unless noted)
- 1934–1945: Dakota Wesleyan
- 1945–1965: North Central (IL)

Head coaching record
- Overall: 27–39–2 (college football); 162–63 (college basketball)

Accomplishments and honors

Championships
- Football; 1 SDIC (1936) Basketball; 3 SDIC regular season (1939–1940, 1943)

Awards
- Consensus All-American (1919); 3× All-Big Ten (1919, 1920, 1921); University of Iowa Athletics Hall of Fame

Lester Cort Belding (December 5, 1900 – May 27, 1965) was an American athlete and coach in football, basketball, and track and field. He was the first football player from the University of Iowa to be named a consensus All-American. He was inducted into the National Association of Intercollegiate Athletics Hall of Fame in 1963.

== Early years ==
A native of Mason City, Iowa, Belding was a star football player for Mason City High School from 1914 to 1917.

== University of Iowa ==
=== Football ===
Belding enrolled at the University of Iowa where he played football for legendary coach Howard Jones. He was a consensus Football All-American at the end position in 1919, the first player from the University of Iowa to receive the honor. Considered "one of the nation's premier collegiate pass catchers of his era," he played on the undefeated 1921 national championship team that outscored opponents 123–15 and included Gordon Locke, Aubrey Devine, Glenn Devine, and Duke Slater. He was also a three-time first-team All-Big Ten Conference selection.

=== Track ===
Belding was also the captain of Iowa's track team in 1921, competing in the 100 and 220-yard dashes.

== Coach and athletic director ==
After graduating from Iowa in 1922, Belding became a coach. He coached at a prep school in Boulder, Colorado. In 1923, Belding accepted a coaching position in Clinton, Iowa, where he coached two state championship football teams. Belding also joined the Rock Island Independents of the National Football League (NFL), playing in a single game for the team in 1925. He next accepted a position at the freshman coach at the University of North Carolina. He later served as the high school coach at Greensboro, North Carolina for seven years. In 1933, Belding returned to Iowa where he was put in charge of high school athletics at Reinbeck, Iowa. From 1934 to 1945, he was the athletic director and head football and basketball coach at Dakota Wesleyan College in Mitchell, South Dakota. He finished his career serving 20 years, from 1945 to 1965, as a track and football coach and athletic director at North Central College in Naperville, Illinois. in 1963, Belding was inducted into the National Association of Intercollegiate Athletics Hall of Fame.

Belding died of a heart attack in 1965 at age 64. He was posthumously inducted into the University of Iowa Athletics Hall of Fame in 1991.

== Head coaching record ==
=== College football ===
Year	Team	Overall	Conference	Standing	Bowl/playoffs
Dakota Wesleyan Tigers (South Dakota Intercollegiate Conference) (1934–1939)
1934	Dakota Wesleyan	0–7–1	0–6–1	10th	
1935	Dakota Wesleyan	3–4	2–3	T–6th	
1936	Dakota Wesleyan	5–2–1	5–0–1	T–1st	
1937	Dakota Wesleyan	3–4	1–2	6th	
1938	Dakota Wesleyan	5–3	4–1	2nd	
1939	Dakota Wesleyan	2–5	2–3	T–6th	
Dakota Wesleyan Tigers (South Dakota College Conference) (1940–1942)
1940	Dakota Wesleyan	3–3			
1941	Dakota Wesleyan	2–5			
1942	Dakota Wesleyan	1–3–1			
Dakota Wesleyan:		24–36–3			
North Central Cardinals (Independent) (1945)
1945	North Central	3–3			
North Central:		3–3			
Total:		27–39–2			
National championship Conference title Conference division title or championship game berth

=== College basketball ===
Record table
Season	Team	Overall	Conference	Standing	Postseason
Dakota Wesleyan Tigers (South Dakota Intercollegiate Conference) (1934–1943)
1934–35	Dakota Wesleyan	14–3	10–3	2nd	
1935–36	Dakota Wesleyan	10–5	10–4	2nd	
1936–37	Dakota Wesleyan	12–5	7–3	2nd	
1937–38	Dakota Wesleyan	11–10	7–5	4th	
1938–39	Dakota Wesleyan	20–3	11–2	1st	
1939–40	Dakota Wesleyan	14–5	7–1	1st	
1940–41	Dakota Wesleyan	16–5			
1941–42	Dakota Wesleyan	8–8			
1942–43	Dakota Wesleyan	21–2	11–1	1st	
Dakota Wesleyan Tigers (South Dakota Intercollegiate Conference) (1944–1945)
1944–45	Dakota Wesleyan	13–4			
Dakota Wesleyan:		139–50			
North Central Cardinals (College Conference of Illinois and Wisconsin) (1946–1948)
1946–47	North Central	13–4	8–2	2nd	
1947–48	North Central	10–9	5–5	T–3rd	
North Central:		23–13	13–7		
Total:		162–63			
National champion Postseason invitational champion Conference regular season champion Conference regular season and conference tournament champion Division regular season champion Division regular season and conference tournament champion Conference tournament champion
