= Charles Carpenter (American football) =

American football player (1898–1975)

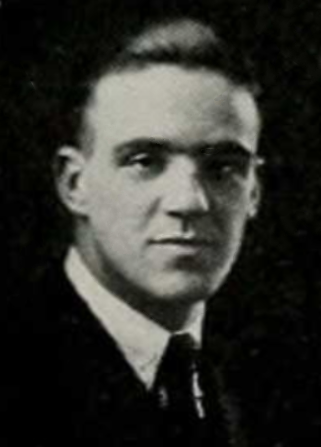
- Carpenter from The Badger (1921)

Profile
- Position: Center

Personal information
- Born: March 11, 1898; Hartland, Wisconsin, U.S.
- Died: June 22, 1975 (aged 77)

Career information
- College: University of Wisconsin–Madison

Career history
- 1919: Wisconsin

Awards and highlights
- Consensus All-American (1919); First-team All-Big Ten (1919)

Charles H. Carpenter (March 11, 1898 – June 22, 1975) was an American football player. He played college football for the Wisconsin Badgers football team of the University of Wisconsin and was captain of the 1919 Wisconsin Badgers football team. He was recognized as a consensus first-team All-American at the center position in 1919. While attending Wisconsin, Carpenter was also a member of Alpha Delta Phi, Iron Cross, White Spades, Skull and Crescent, Star and Arrow, and Student Council of Defense, and president of the Athletic Board.

In 1920, Carpenter became an assistant football coach at Stanford.
