= Doc Alexander =

American football player and coach (1897–1975)

Joe Alexander

No. 10, 20, 25
- Position: Guard

Personal information
- Born: April 1, 1897; Silver Creek, New York, U.S.
- Died: September 12, 1975 (aged 78); New York City, U.S.

Career information
- College: Syracuse

Career history

Playing
- Rochester Jeffersons (1921–1924); New York Giants (1925–1927)

Coaching
- Rochester Jeffersons (1922) Head coach; New York Giants (1926) Head coach; CCNY (1942) Head coach

Awards and highlights
- NFL champion (1927); 2× First-team All-Pro (1921, 1922); Second-team All-Pro (1926); 2× Consensus All-American (1918, 1919); First-team All-American (1920)

Career NFL statistics
- Games played: 40
- Games started: 35
- Touchdowns: 4
- Stats at Pro Football Reference

Head coaching record
- Career: NFL: 8–8–2 (.500) College: 1–7–1 (.167)
- Coaching profile at Pro Football Reference
- College Football Hall of Fame

Joseph A. "Doc" Alexander (April 1, 1897 – September 12, 1975) was an American football player, who played center, tackle, guard, and end, and coach in the National Football League (NFL).

Alexander was born in Silver Creek, New York, the son of Russian immigrants, and was Jewish. He attended Syracuse University, and played for the school football team—twice being named All American at guard—as he attained a medical degree. He was inducted to the College Football Hall of Fame in 1954, and also into the International Jewish Sports Hall of Fame.

Alexander played for the Syracuse Pros (1921), and played professionally in the National Football League (NFL) for the Rochester Jeffersons (1921–24) and the New York Giants (1925–27). He was a two-time First-team All-Pro, in both 1921 and 1922. In 1922 he was the head coach of the Jeffersons, and in 1926 he was the head coach of the Giants.

== Head coaching record ==
=== College ===
Year	Team	Overall	Conference	Standing	Bowl/playoffs
CCNY Beavers (Independent) (1942)
1942	CCNY	1–7–1			
CCNY:		1–7–1			
Total:		1–7–1			

=== NFL ===
Team	Year	Regular season					Postseason			
Team	Year	Won	Lost	Ties	Win %	Finish	Won	Lost	Win %	Result
ROC	1922	0	4	1	.100	T–15th in NFL	–	–	–	–
ROC total		0	4	1	.100		–	–	–	
NYG	1926	8	4	1	.654	6th in NFL	–	–	–	–
NYG total		8	4	1	.654		–	–	–	
Total		8	8	2	.500					

== See also ==
- List of select Jewish football players
