= Harry J. Robertson =

American football player and coach (1896–1962)

Biographical details
- Born: March 4, 1896; Chambly, Quebec, Canada
- Died: January 7, 1962 (aged 65); Coral Gables, Florida, U.S.

Playing career
- 1916–1917: Syracuse
- 1919–1920: Syracuse
- 1922: Rochester Jeffersons
- Positions: End, tackle

Coaching career (HC unless noted)
- 1921–1923: Syracuse (line)
- 1924–1933: Oglethorpe

Head coaching record
- Overall: 39–49–5

Accomplishments and honors

Championships
- 2 SIAA (1924–1925)

Awards
- Oglethorpe Athletics Hall of Fame

Harold J. Robertson (March 4, 1896 – January 7, 1962) was a Canadian-born player and coach of American football. He played one game as a professional football player with the Rochester Jeffersons of the National Football League (NFL) in 1922 and was the head football coach at Oglethorpe University from 1924 to 1933.

== Biography ==
A native of Chambly, Quebec, Robertson grew up in Somerville, Massachusetts, and attended Somerville High School and Worcester Academy. In 1914 and 1915, Robertson and his brother Jim Robertson played summer baseball for the Falmouth "Cottage Club" team in what is now the Cape Cod Baseball League. While Jim played first base, Harry was a catcher, and was reportedly a "fast and aggressive" player.

Robertson served in the United States Army during World War I, and played on the football team at Camp Dix in 1918. After his service, Robertson attended Syracuse University, where he played college football as an end, and was team captain. In 1920, Robertson captained his Syracuse squad against his brother Jim, who was captain of the Dartmouth team. Robertson graduated from Syracuse in 1922, and later that year appeared in a single game for the Rochester Jeffersons of the National Football League (NFL), his only game as a professional.

Robertson served as a line coach at Syracuse from 1921 to 1923, and became the head football coach at Oglethorpe University in 1924, succeeding his brother, Jim, who had coached the Oglethorpe team in 1923. At Oglethorpe, Robertson led his team to back-to-back Southern Intercollegiate Athletic Association (SIAA) titles in 1924 and 1925, and his 1926 team posted a landmark upset over William Alexander's Georgia Tech squad, winning by a score of 7 to 6. Robertson led Oglethorpe for ten seasons, and was succeeded by John Patrick following the 1933 season.

Robertson was inducted into the Oglethorpe Athletics Hall of Fame in 1962, and was remembered as "a football genius...lively, prankish and warmhearted." He died in Coral Gables, Florida in 1962 at age 65.

== Head coaching record ==
Year	Team	Overall	Conference	Standing	Bowl/playoffs
Oglethorpe Stormy Petrels (Southern Intercollegiate Athletic Association) (1924–1926)
1924	Oglethorpe	6–3–1	5–0	T–1st	
1925	Oglethorpe	8–3	8–1	1st	
1926	Oglethorpe	3–7–1	3–4–1	17th	
Oglethorpe Stormy Petrels (Independent) (1927)
1927	Oglethorpe	2–6			
Oglethorpe Stormy Petrels (Southern Intercollegiate Athletic Association) (1928–1929)
1928	Oglethorpe	3–5–1	1–2	22nd	
1929	Oglethorpe	5–4–1	1–2	21st	
Oglethorpe Stormy Petrels (Independent) (1930–1933)
1930	Oglethorpe	4–4–1			
1931	Oglethorpe	3–6			
1932	Oglethorpe	1–6			
1933	Oglethorpe	4–5			
Oglethorpe:		39–49–5	15–5		
Total:		39–49–5			
National championship Conference title Conference division title or championship game berth
