= Stan Keck =

American football player, coach, college athletics administrator (1897–1951)

Biographical details
- Born: September 11, 1897; Greensburg, Pennsylvania, U.S.
- Died: January 20, 1951 (aged 53); Pittsburgh, Pennsylvania, U.S.

Playing career
- 1919–1921: Princeton
- 1923: Cleveland Indians
- Positions: Tackle, guard

Coaching career (HC unless noted)
- 1939–1941: Norwich (line)
- 1942–1946: Norwich
- 1947–1950: Waynesburg

Administrative career (AD unless noted)
- 1947–1951: Waynesburg

Head coaching record
- Overall: 23–26–4

Accomplishments and honors

Awards
- Unanimous All-American (1920); Consensus All-American (1921)
- College Football Hall of Fame; Inducted in 1959 (profile)

James Stanton Keck (September 11, 1897 – January 20, 1951) was an American football player, coach, and college athletics administrator. He attended The Kiski School and went on to play college football at Princeton University as a tackle and guard. Keck was selected as an All-American in 1920 and in 1921. Keck served as the head football coach at Norwich University in Northfield, Vermont from 1942 to 1946 and Waynesburg College—now known as Waynesburg University—in Waynesburg, Pennsylvania from 1947 to 1950, compiling a career college football coaching record of 23–26–4. He was inducted into the College Football Hall of Fame as a player in 1959.

== Death ==
Keck died on January 20, 1951, after suffering a stroke at Western Pennsylvania Hospital in Pittsburgh. He had transferred there five days earlier from Greene Country Memorial Hospital, to which he was admitted the previous month with high blood pressure.

== Head coaching record ==
Year	Team	Overall	Conference	Standing	Bowl/playoffs
Norwich Cadets (Independent) (1942–1946)
1942	Norwich	5–2			
1943	No team—World War II				
1944	Norwich	1–3			
1945	No team—World War II				
1946	Norwich	0–6–1			
Norwich:		6–11–1			
Waynesburg Yellow Jackets (Independent) (1947–1950)
1947	Waynesburg	4–5			
1948	Waynesburg	5–4			
1949	Waynesburg	5–3–1			
1950	Waynesburg	3–3–2			
Waynesburg:		17–15–3			
Total:		23–26–4			
