= Paul Meyers (American football) =

American football player (1895–1966)

Profile
- Positions: End, wingback

Personal information
- Born: November 19, 1895; Chicago, Illinois
- Died: July 2, 1966 (aged 70)
- Listed height: 5 ft 11 in (1.80 m)
- Listed weight: 170 lb (77 kg)

Career information
- High school: East Division (Milwaukee, Wisconsin)
- College: Wisconsin

Career history
- New York Brickley Giants (1921); Rochester Jeffersons (1922); Racine Legion (1923)

Awards and highlights
- First-team All-Big Ten (1919)
- Stats at Pro Football Reference

Paul Duncan Meyers (November 19, 1895 – July 2, 1966) was an American football player. He played professionally in the National Football League (NFL) with the Rochester Jeffersons, New York Brickley Giants and the Racine Legion. Brickley's New York Giants are not related to the modern-day New York Giants. Prior to joining the NFL, Meyers played college football at the University of Wisconsin.
