= 1916 Western Conference football season =

- Sport: Football
- Champion: Ohio State

Football seasons
- ← 1915 1917 →

1916 Western Conference football standings
	Conf.					Overall
Team	W		L		T	W		L		T
Ohio State $	4	–	0	–	0	7	–	0	–	0
Northwestern	4	–	1	–	0	6	–	1	–	0
Minnesota	3	–	1	–	0	6	–	1	–	0
Chicago	3	–	3	–	0	3	–	4	–	0
Illinois	2	–	2	–	1	3	–	3	–	1
Wisconsin	1	–	2	–	1	4	–	2	–	1
Iowa	1	–	2	–	0	4	–	3	–	0
Indiana	0	–	3	–	1	2	–	4	–	1
Purdue	0	–	4	–	1	2	–	4	–	1
$ – Conference champion

The 1916 Western Conference football season was the twenty-first season of college football played by the member schools of the Western Conference (later known as the Big Ten Conference) and was a part of the 1916 college football season.

== Season overview ==
Ohio State won its first Western Conference championship since joining in 1913 by going undefeated in both league play (4–0) and overall 7–0.

After finishing last for three straight seasons, Northwestern came in second place at 6-1 (4-1 WC) with their only conference loss to Ohio State in the finale for both teams.

Minnesota came in third at 6-1 (3-1 WC), Chicago fourth at 3-4 (3-3), Illinois fifth at 3-3-1 (2–2–1), and Wisconsin sixth at 4-2-1 (1–2–1).

Iowa went 4–3 overall and 1–2 in the conference for seventh place. Indiana came in eighth at 2-4-1 (0–3–1), and Purdue was last at 2-4-1 (0–4–1).

=== Ohio State ===
Date	Opponent	Site	Result	Source
October 7	Ohio Wesleyan	Ohio Field; Columbus, OH	W 12–0	
October 14	Oberlin	Ohio Field; Columbus, OH	W 128–0	
October 21	at Illinois	Illinois Field; Champaign, IL (rivalry)	W 7–6	
November 4	Wisconsin	Ohio Field; Columbus, OH	W 14-13	
November 11	Indiana	Ohio Field; Columbus, OH	W 46–7	
November 18	at Case	Van Horn Field; Cleveland, OH	W 28–0	
November 25	Northwestern	Ohio Field; Columbus, OH	W 23–3	

=== Northwestern ===
Date	Opponent	Site	Result	Attendance	Source
October 7	Lake Forest*	Northwestern Field; Evanston, IL	W 26–7		
October 21	at Chicago	Stagg Field; Chicago, IL	W 10–0		
October 28	Drake*	Northwestern Field; Evanston, IL	W 40–6		
November 4	at Indiana	Jordan Field; Bloomington, IN	W 7–0		
November 10	Iowa	Northwestern Field; Evanston, IL	W 20–13		
November 18	Purdue	Northwestern Field; Evanston, IL	W 38–6		
November 25	at Ohio State	Ohio Field; Columbus, OH	L 3–23		
*Non-conference game

=== Minnesota ===
Date	Opponent	Site	Result	Attendance	Source
October 7	South Dakota State*	Northrop Field; Minneapolis, MN	W 41–7		
October 14	North Dakota*	Northrop Field; Minneapolis, MN	W 47–7		
October 21	South Dakota*	Northrop Field; Minneapolis, MN	W 81–0		
October 28	Iowa	Northrop Field; Minneapolis, MN (rivalry)	W 67–0	5,000	
November 4	Illinois	Northrop Field; Minneapolis, MN	L 9–14	11,368	
November 18	Wisconsin	Northrop Field; Minneapolis, MN (rivalry)	W 54–0	24,000	
November 25	at Chicago	Stagg Field; Chicago, IL	W 49–0	22,000	
*Non-conference game

=== Chicago ===
Date	Opponent	Site	Result	Attendance	Source
October 7	Carleton*	Stagg Field; Chicago, IL	L 0–7		
October 14	Indiana	Stagg Field; Chicago, IL	W 22–0		
October 21	Northwestern	Stagg Field; Chicago, IL	L 0–10		
October 28	at Wisconsin	Randall Field; Madison, WI	L 7–30		
November 4	Purdue	Stagg Field; Chicago, IL (rivalry)	W 16–7		
November 18	at Illinois	Illinois Field; Champaign, IL	W 20–7	831	
November 25	Minnesota	Stagg Field; Chicago, IL	L 0–49	22,000	
*Non-conference game

=== Illinois ===
Date	Opponent	Site	Result	Attendance	Source
October 7	Kansas*	Illinois Field; Champaign, IL	W 30–0	3,788	
October 14	Colgate*	Illinois Field; Champaign, IL	L 3–15	5,263	
October 21	Ohio State	Illinois Field; Champaign, IL (rivalry)	L 6–7	4,388	
October 28	at Purdue	Stuart Field; Lafayette, IN (rivalry)	W 14–7		
November 4	at Minnesota	Northrop Field; Minneapolis, MN	W 14–9	11,368	
November 18	Chicago	Illinois Field; Champaign, IL	L 7–20	831	
November 25	at Wisconsin	Randall Field; Madison, WI	T 0–0	6,000	
*Non-conference game

=== Wisconsin ===
Date	Opponent	Site	Result	Attendance	Source
October 7	Lawrence*	Randall Field; Madison, WI	W 20–0		
October 14	South Dakota State*	Randall Field; Madison, WI	W 28–3		
October 21	Haskell*	Randall Field; Madison, WI	W 13–0		
October 28	Chicago^{†}	Randall Field; Madison, WI	W 30–7		
November 4	at Ohio State	Ohio Field; Columbus, OH	L 13–14		
November 18	at Minnesota	Northrop Field; Minneapolis, MN (rivalry)	L 0–54	24,000	
November 25	Illinois	Randall Field; Madison, WI	T 0–0	6,000	
*Non-conference game; ^{†}Homecoming

=== Iowa ===
Date	Opponent	Site	Result	Attendance
October 7	Cornell (IA)*	Iowa Field; Iowa City, IA	W 31–6	
October 14	Grinnell*	Iowa Field; Iowa City, IA	W 17–7	
October 21	Purdue	Iowa Field; Iowa City, IA	W 24–6	
October 28	at Minnesota	Northrop Field; Minneapolis, MN (rivalry)	L 0–67	5,000
November 11	at Northwestern	Northwestern Field; Evanston, IL	L 13–20	
November 18	at Iowa State*	State Field; Ames, IA (rivalry)	W 19–16	
November 25	Nebraska*^{†}	Iowa Field; Iowa City, IA (rivalry)	L 17–34	
*Non-conference game; ^{†}Homecoming

=== Indiana ===
Date	Opponent	Site	Result	Attendance	Source
September 30	DePauw*	Jordan Field; Bloomington, IN	W 20–0		
October 14	at Chicago	Stagg Field; Chicago, IL	L 0–22		
October 28	vs. Tufts*	Washington Park; Indianapolis, IN	L 10–12		
November 4	Northwestern	Jordan Field; Bloomington, IN	L 0–7		
November 11	at Ohio State	Ohio Field; Columbus, OH	L 7–46		
November 18	Florida*	Jordan Field; Bloomington, IN	W 14–3	5,000	
November 25	at Purdue	Stuart Field; West Lafayette, IN (rivalry)	T 0–0		
*Non-conference game

=== Purdue ===
Date	Opponent	Site	Result	Source
October 7	DePauw*	Stuart Field; West Lafayette, IN	W 13–0	
October 14	Wabash	Stuart Field; West Lafayette, IN	W 28–7	
October 21	at Iowa	Iowa Field; Iowa City, IA	L 6–24	
October 28	Illinois	Stuart Field; West Lafayette, IN (rivalry)	L 7–14	
November 4	at Chicago	Stagg Field; Chicago, IL (rivalry)	L 7–16	
November 19	at Northwestern	Northwestern Field; Evanston, IL	L 6–38	
November 25	Indiana	Stuart Field; West Lafayette, IN (Old Oaken Bucket)	T 0–0	
*Non-conference game

=== Bowl games ===
No Western Conference schools participated in any bowl games during the 1916 season.

== All-American honors ==
=== Tackles ===
- George Hauser, Minnesota (INS-1)
- Fred Becker, Iowa (WE-1)
- Bob Karch, Ohio State (FM)
- Frank A. R. Mayer, Minnesota (WE-2)

=== Guards ===
- Sinclair, Minnesota (PP-2)

=== Centers ===
- Fred Becker, Iowa (FY-2)

=== Quarterbacks ===
- Bart Macomber, Illinois (College Football Hall of Fame) (WE-2; PP-2; FY-1)

=== Halfbacks ===
- **Chic Harley**, Ohio State (College Football Hall of Fame) (WC-1; UP-1; INS-1; WE-1; PP-1; FY-1; BP-1)
- Claire Long, Minnesota (FM)
- Paddy Driscoll, Northwestern (College and Pro Football Hall of Fame) (WC-3; UP-2)

=== Fullbacks ===
- Pudge Wyman, Minnesota (UP-2; WE-1; FY-2)

=== Key ===
NCAA recognized selectors for 1916

- WC = Collier's Weekly as selected by Walter Camp
- INS = International News Service
- MS = Frank Menke Syndicate

Other selectors

- UP = United Press
- WE = Walter Eckersall, of the Chicago Daily Tribune
- FM = Frank G. Menke, former sporting editor of the International News Service (INS)
- MON = Monty, noted New York sports writer
- PP = Paul Purman, noted sports writer whose All-American team was syndicated in newspapers across the United States
- LP = Lawrence Perry, sporting editor of the New York Evening Post
- FY = Fielding H. Yost
- BP = The Boston Post, selected by Charles E. Parker, football expert of The Boston Post

Bold = Consensus All-American

- 1 – First-team selection
- 2 – Second-team selection
- 3 – Third-team selection

== All-Western selections ==
=== Ends ===
- Bert Baston, Minnesota (ECP-1; JV-1) (CFHOF)
- Chic Harley, Ohio State (ECP-1; JV-1) (CFHOF)
- Frederick I. Norman, Northwestern (ECP-2)
- Charles Bolen, Ohio State (ECP-2; JV-2)
- Flynn, Minnesota (JV-2)

=== Tackles ===
- George Hauser, Minnesota (ECP-1; JV-1)
- Fred Becker, Iowa (ECP-1)
- Howard Courtney, Ohio State (JV-1)
- Manley R. Petty, Illinois (ECP-2)
- Frank A. R. Mayer, Minnesota (ECP-2; JV-2)
- Runquist, Illinois (JV-2)

=== Guards ===
- Charles Higgins, Chicago (ECP-1)
- Gilbert S. Sinclair, Minnesota (ECP-1)
- Conrad L. Eklund, Minnesota (ECP-2; JV-1)
- Gorgas, Chicago (JV-2)

=== Centers ===
- John L. Townley Jr., Minnesota (ECP-1; JV-1)

=== Quarterbacks ===
- Bart Macomber, Illinois (ECP-1; JV-1) (CFHOF)
- Claire Long, Minnesota (ECP-2; JV-2)

=== Halfbacks ===
- Paddy Driscoll, Northwestern (ECP-1; JV-2) (CFHOF/PFHOF)
- Harold Hansen, Minnesota (ECP-2)

=== Fullbacks ===
- Pudge Wyman, Minnesota (ECP-1; JV-1)
- Bob Koehler, Northwestern (ECP-2; JV-2)

=== *Key* ===
Bold = consensus choice by a majority of the selectors

ECP = E. C. Patterson in Collier's Weekly

JV = Jack Veiock

CFHOF = College Football Hall of Fame
