= 1917 All-Western college football team =

American all-star college football team

The 1917 All-Western college football team consists of American football players selected to the All-Western teams chosen by various selectors for the 1917 college football season.

== All-Western selections ==
=== Ends ===
- Charles Bolen, Ohio State (FM, HP, LA, LGS, PD)
- W. M. Kelley, Wisconsin (FM, GWA, LA, LGS, PD)
- Charles Laun, Iowa (GWA)
- Alan Boyd, Michigan (HP)
- John Rasmussen, Camp Grant / Nebraska (REAL)
- Gardiner, Camp Custer / Carlisle Indian (REAL)

=== Tackles ===
- George Hauser, Minnesota (FM, HB, GWA, LA, LGS, PD)
- Harold J. Courtney, Ohio State (LA, LGS, PD [guard])
- Dave Philbin, Notre Dame (GWA)
- Ernest Hubka, Nebraska (HP)
- Hugh Blacklock, Great Lakes Naval Training Station / Michigan (REAL)
- Ward, Camp Custer (REAL)

=== Guards ===
- Charles Higgins, Chicago (FM, GWA, LA, PD)
- Elmert T. Rundquist, Illinois (FM [tackle], LA, LGS)
- Conrad L. Eklund, Minnesota (GWA, LGS, PD [tackle])
- John Ulrich, Northwestern (FM)
- Tillie Voss, Detroit (HP)
- Joseph Hanish, Michigan (HP)
- Whiting, Camp Grant – Chicago (REAL)
- Robins, Great Lakes Naval Training Station / Springfield Normal (REAL)

=== Centers ===
- Frank Rydzewski, Notre Dame (FM, GWA, LA, LGS, PD)
- Frank Culver, Michigan (HP)
- Pottinger, Great Lakes Naval Training Station – Wisconsin (REAL)

=== Quarterbacks ===
- Archie Weston, Michigan (FM, LA [halfback], LGS)
- Eber Simpson, Wisconsin (LA, PD)
- Howard Yerges, Sr., Ohio State (GWA)
- Harry Costello, Camp Custer / Georgetown (REAL)

=== Halfbacks ===
- Chic Harley, Ohio State (FM, GWA, HP, LA, LGS) (CFHOF)
- Joe Brandy, Notre Dame (FM)
- Hugo Otopalik, Nebraska (LGS)
- Eber Simpson, Wisconsin (GWA)
- Allen, Detroit (HP)
- Fritz Shiverick, Camp Grant / Cornell (REAL)
- James B. Craig, Fort Sheridan / Michigan (REAL)

=== Fullbacks ===
- Bob Koehler, Northwestern (FM, GWA, LA, LGS)
- Forrest Strome, Kalamazoo (HP)
- Cedric C. Smith, Great Lakes Naval Training Station / Michigan (REAL)

== Key ==
- **Bold** = consensus choice by a majority of the selectors
- FM = Frank G. Menke, sporting editor of Newspaper Feature Service
- GWA = G. W. Axelson in Chicago Herald
- HP = Howard Pearson in Detroit Journal
- LA = Leonard Adams, football editor Chicago Journal
- LGS = Lambert G. Sullivan, football editor of Chicago Daily News
- PD = Paddy Driscoll in Chicago Examiner
- REAL = The Real All-Western Eleven (by Lambert G. Sullivan, football editor Chicago Daily News)
- CFHOF = College Football Hall of Fame

== See also ==
- 1917 College Football All-America Team
- 1917 All-Big Ten Conference football team
