= 1916 All-Western Conference football team =

The 1916 All-Western Conference football team consists of American football players selected to the all-conference team for the Western Conference, later known as the Big Ten Conference, as chosen by various selectors for the 1916 college football season.

== All-Western Conference selections ==
=== Ends ===
- Bert Baston, Minnesota (WE-1; AX-1; IV-1; ECP-1)
- Paul Meyers, Wisconsin (WE-1)
- Charles Bolen, Ohio (AX-1; ECP-2)
- Reynold Kraft, Illinois (WE-2; IV-1)
- Frederick I. Norman, Northwestern (WE-2; ECP-2)

=== Tackles ===
- Jackson, Chicago (WE-1)
- Frank A. R. Mayer, Minnesota (WE-1; ECP-2)
- George Hauser, Minnesota (AX-1; ECP-1)
- Fred Becker, Iowa (ECP-1)
- Manley R. Petty, Illinois (ECP-2)
- Elmer T. Rundquist, Illinois (WE-2)
- Reding Putnam, Northwestern (WE-2)

=== Guards ===
- Conrad L. Eklund, Minnesota (WE-1; IV-1; ECP-2)
- Leonard L. Charpier, Illinois (WE-1)
- M. J. Proud, Purdue (AX-1)
- Gilbert S. Sinclair, Minnesota (AX-1; ECP-1)
- Eldon J. Smith, Northwestern (IV-1)
- Charles Higgins, Chicago (WE-2; ECP-1)
- Charlie Bachman, Notre Dame (ECP-2)

=== Centers ===
- Fred Becker, Iowa (WE-1; AX-1 [tackle])
- John L. Townley, Jr., Minnesota (AX-1; IV-1; WE-2 [guard]; ECP-1)
- Charles Carpenter, Wisconsin (WE-2)
- Walter Niemann, Michigan (ECP-2)
- Fisher, Chicago (IV-2)
- Ferdinand Holtkamp, Ohio State (AX-2; IV-2 [guard])

=== Quarterbacks ===
- Bart Macomber, Illinois (WE-1; AX-1; IV-1; ECP-1)
- Claire Long, Minnesota (WE-2; AX-2; IV-2; ECP-2)

=== Halfbacks ===
- Chic Harley, Ohio State (WE-1; AX-1; IV-1; ECP-1)
- Paddy Driscoll, Northwestern (WE-1; AX-1; IV-1; ECP-1)
- John Maulbetsch, Michigan (ECP-1)
- Eber Simpson, Wisconsin (AX-2; IV-2)
- Archie Erehart, Indiana (WE-2; AX-2)
- J. Elwood Davis, Iowa (WE-2)
- Harold Hansen, Minnesota (ECP-2)
- Stan Cofall, Notre Dame (ECP-2)
- Joseph M. Sprafka, Minnesota (IV-2)

=== Fullbacks ===
- Pudge Wyman, Minnesota (WE-1; AX-1; IV-1; ECP-1)
- Bob Koehler, Northwestern (WE-2; AX-2; IV-2; ECP-2)

== Key ==
WE = Walter Eckersall in the Chicago Tribune

AX = G. W. Axelson in the Chicago Herald

IV = Irving Vaughn in the Chicago Examiner

ECP = E. C. Patterson in Collier's Weekly

Bold = consensus choice by a majority of the selectors

== See also ==
- 1916 College Football All-America Team
- 1916 All-Western college football team
