= 1916 All-Western college football team =

American all-star college football team

The 1916 All-Western college football team consists of American football players selected to the All-Western teams chosen by various selectors for the 1916 college football season.

== All-Western selections ==
=== Ends ===
- Bert Baston, Minnesota (ECP-1; JV-1) (CFHOF)
- Chic Harley, Ohio State (ECP-1; JV-1) (CFHOF)
- Tim Corey, Nebraska (JV-1)
- Frederick I. Norman, Northwestern (ECP-2)
- Charles Bolen, Ohio State (ECP-2; JV-2)
- Flynn, Minnesota (JV-2)

=== Tackles ===
- George Hauser, Minnesota (ECP-1; JV-1)
- Fred Becker, Iowa (ECP-1)
- Howard Courtney, Ohio State (JV-1)
- Manley R. Petty, Illinois (ECP-2)
- Frank A. R. Mayer, Minnesota (ECP-2; JV-2)
- Runquist, Illinois (JV-2)

=== Guards ===
- Charles Higgins, Chicago (ECP-1)
- Gilbert S. Sinclair, Minnesota (ECP-1)
- Conrad L. Eklund, Minnesota (ECP-2; JV-1)
- Charlie Bachman, Notre Dame (ECP-2; JV-1) (CFHOF)
- Alan Boyd, Michigan (JV-2)
- Gorgas, Chicago (JV-2)

=== Centers ===
- John L. Townley, Jr., Minnesota (ECP-1; JV-1)
- Walter Niemann, Michigan (ECP-2)
- Slip Madigan, Notre Dame (JV-1)

=== Quarterbacks ===
- Bart Macomber, Illinois (ECP-1; JV-1) (CFHOF)
- Claire Long, Minnesota (ECP-2; JV-2)

=== Halfbacks ===
- Paddy Driscoll, Northwestern (ECP-1; JV-2) (CFHOF/PFHOF)
- John Maulbetsch, Michigan (ECP-1) (CFHOF)
- Harold Hansen, Minnesota (ECP-2)
- Stan Cofall, Notre Dame (ECP-2; JV-1)
- Loren Caley, Nebraska (JV-2)

=== Fullbacks ===
- Pudge Wyman, Minnesota (ECP-1; JV-1)
- Bob Koehler, Northwestern (ECP-2; JV-2)

== Key ==
Bold = consensus choice by a majority of the selectors

ECP = E. C. Patterson in Collier's Weekly

JV = Jack Veiock

CFHOF = College Football Hall of Fame

== See also ==
- 1916 College Football All-America Team
- 1916 All-Western Conference football team
