= 1917 All-Eastern football team =

American all-star college football team

The 1917 All-Eastern football team consists of American football players chosen by various selectors as the best players at each position among the Eastern colleges and universities during the 1917 college football season.

== All-Eastern selections ==
=== Quarterbacks ===
- Benny Boynton, Williams (TM-1)
- Bert Bell, Penn (TM-2)

=== Halfbacks ===
- Light, Penn (TM-1)
- Elmer Oliphant, Army (TM-1)
- Ira Rodgers, West Virginia (TM-2)
- Cornog, Swarthmore (TM-2)

=== Fullbacks ===
- George McLaren, Pittsburgh (TM-1)
- Joe Berry, Penn (TM-2)

=== Ends ===
- Heinie Miller, Penn (TM-1)
- John Tressel, Washington & Jefferson (TM-1)
- Paul Robeson, Rutgers (TM-2)
- Red Carlson, Pittsburgh (TM-2)

=== Tackles ===
- Pete Henry, Washington & Jefferson (TM-1)
- Alf Cobb, Syracuse (TM-1)
- Murphy, Dartmouth (TM-2)
- Fred Seidel, Pittsburgh (TM-2)

=== Guards ===
- Jock Sutherland, Pittsburgh (TM-1)
- Eugene Neely, Dartmouth (TM-1)
- Byron Wimberly, Washington & Jefferson (TM-2)
- Czarnekie, Penn State (TM-2)

=== Centers ===
- Russ Bailey, West Virginia (TM-1)
- Alex Wray, Penn (TM-2)

== Key ==
- TM = Tiny Maxwell

== See also ==
- 1917 College Football All-America Team
