= Howard Yerges Sr. =

American football player (1896–1947)

Profile
- Positions: Quarterback, halfback

Personal information
- Born: January 28, 1896; Columbus, Ohio, U.S.
- Died: June 30, 1947 (aged 51); Point Pleasant, West Virginia, U.S.
- Listed height: 5 ft 9 in (1.75 m)
- Listed weight: 155 lb (70 kg)

Career information
- College: Ohio State (1914–1917)

Career history
- Dayton Triangles (1919); Columbus Panhandles (1920)

Career statistics
- Games played: 1
- Games started: 1

Howard Frederick Yerges Sr. (January 28, 1896 – June 30, 1947) was an American football player and coach of football and basketball.

Yerges was born in Columbus, Ohio, in 1896. He attended North High School in Columbus and then enrolled at Ohio State University. He was the quarterback for the Ohio State Buckeyes football teams from 1915 to 1917. Along with Chic Harley, he led the 1916 and 1917 Ohio State teams coached by John Wilce to consecutive undefeated seasons and Western / Big Ten Conference championships. Yerges' "good generalship" was credited with being "one of the biggest factors" in Ohio State's success in those years.

Yerges was selected as a first-team player on the 1917 All-Big Ten Conference football team. He also won the Western Conference medal in 1917 for his excellence in both athletics and academics.

Yerges served in the Navy during World War I. After the war, he played professional football for the Dayton Triangles, appearing in nine games, including seven as a starter, at quarterback and halfback during the 1919 season. With the formation of the American Professional Football Association (APFA)—now known as the National Football League (NFL), he joined the Columbus Panhandles in 1920, starting one game at halfback. He also served as a strategist to the Ohio State football coaching staff in 1920.

In 1921, Yerges was hired as a football and basketball coach at Rice Institute—now known as Rice University—in Houston. In football, he was tasked to coach the backfield under head football coach Philip Arbuckle. Yerges served as the head coach of the Rice Owls men's basketball team for the 1921–22 season, compiling a record of 2–12. He returned to Ohio State in 1924 as an assistant football coach under Wilce.

Yerges later worked in engineering and held a job with the Marietta Manufacturing Company. He died in June 1947 at age 51 at his home in Point Pleasant, West Virginia.

Yerges' son, Howard Yerges Jr., was the starting quarterback for the undefeated 1947 Michigan Wolverines football team.

== Head coach record ==
Record table
Season	Team	Overall	Conference	Standing	Postseason
Rice Owls (Southwest Conference) (1921–1922)
1921–22	Rice	2–12			
Total:		2–12 (.143)			
