= 1916 Wisconsin Badgers football team =

American college football season

1916 Wisconsin Badgers football
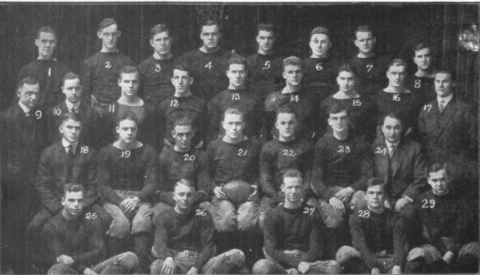
- Conference: Western Conference
- Record: 4–2–1 (1–2–1 Western)
- Head coach: Paul Withington (1st season)
- Captain: Paul Meyers
- Home stadium: Randall Field

1916 Western Conference football standings
	Conf.					Overall
Team	W		L		T	W		L		T
Ohio State $	4	–	0	–	0	7	–	0	–	0
Northwestern	4	–	1	–	0	6	–	1	–	0
Minnesota	3	–	1	–	0	6	–	1	–	0
Chicago	3	–	3	–	0	3	–	4	–	0
Illinois	2	–	2	–	1	3	–	3	–	1
Wisconsin	1	–	2	–	1	4	–	2	–	1
Iowa	1	–	2	–	0	4	–	3	–	0
Indiana	0	–	3	–	1	2	–	4	–	1
Purdue	0	–	4	–	1	2	–	4	–	1
$ – Conference champion

The 1916 Wisconsin Badgers football team represented the University of Wisconsin as a member of the Western Conference during the 1916 college football season. Led Paul Withington in his first and only season as head coach, the Badgers compiled an overall record of 4–2–1 with a mark of 1–2–1 in conference play, placing sixth in the Western Conference. The team's captain was Paul Meyers.

== Schedule ==
Date	Opponent	Site	Result	Attendance	Source
October 7	Lawrence*	Randall Field; Madison, WI	W 20–0		
October 14	South Dakota State*	Randall Field; Madison, WI	W 28–3		
October 21	Haskell*	Randall Field; Madison, WI	W 13–0		
October 28	Chicago^{†}	Randall Field; Madison, WI	W 30–7		
November 4	at Ohio State	Ohio Field; Columbus, OH	L 13–14		
November 18	at Minnesota	Northrop Field; Minneapolis, MN (rivalry)	L 0–54	24,000	
November 25	Illinois	Randall Field; Madison, WI	T 0–0	6,000	
*Non-conference game; ^{†}Homecoming
