= 1916 Illinois Fighting Illini football team =

American college football season

1916 Illinois Fighting Illini football
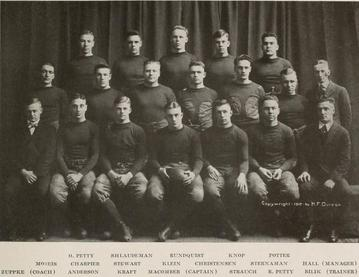
- Conference: Western Conference
- Record: 3–3–1 (2–2–1 Western)
- Head coach: Robert Zuppke (4th season)
- Offensive scheme: I formation
- Captain: Bart Macomber
- Home stadium: Illinois Field

1916 Western Conference football standings
	Conf.					Overall
Team	W		L		T	W		L		T
Ohio State $	4	–	0	–	0	7	–	0	–	0
Northwestern	4	–	1	–	0	6	–	1	–	0
Minnesota	3	–	1	–	0	6	–	1	–	0
Chicago	3	–	3	–	0	3	–	4	–	0
Illinois	2	–	2	–	1	3	–	3	–	1
Wisconsin	1	–	2	–	1	4	–	2	–	1
Iowa	1	–	2	–	0	4	–	3	–	0
Indiana	0	–	3	–	1	2	–	4	–	1
Purdue	0	–	4	–	1	2	–	4	–	1
$ – Conference champion

The 1916 Illinois Fighting Illini football team was an American football team that represented the University of Illinois during the 1916 college football season. In their fourth season under head coach Robert Zuppke, the Illini compiled a 3–3–1 record and finished in fifth place in the Western Conference. Quarterback Bart Macomber was the team captain.

== Schedule ==
Date	Opponent	Site	Result	Attendance	Source
October 7	Kansas*	Illinois Field; Champaign, IL	W 30–0	3,788	
October 14	Colgate*	Illinois Field; Champaign, IL	L 3–15	5,263	
October 21	Ohio State	Illinois Field; Champaign, IL (rivalry)	L 6–7	4,388	
October 28	at Purdue	Stuart Field; Lafayette, IN (rivalry)	W 14–7		
November 4	at Minnesota	Northrop Field; Minneapolis, MN	W 14–9	11,368	
November 18	Chicago	Illinois Field; Champaign, IL	L 7–20	831	
November 25	at Wisconsin	Randall Field; Madison, WI	T 0–0	6,000	
*Non-conference game

== Awards and honors ==
- Bart Macomber, quarterback

- First-team selection by Fielding H. Yost for the 1916 College Football All-America Team
- Second-team selection by Walter Eckersall and Paul Purman for the 1916 All-America team
