= Hubka =

Hubka is a surname. Notable people with the surname include:

- Diane Hubka, American guitarist and vocalist
- Ernie Hubka (1897–1982), American football player, coach and politician
- Gene Hubka (1924–2017), American football player
- Thomas Hubka (born 1932), American architectural historian
