= 1917 All-America college football team =

Official list of the best college football players of 1917

The 1917 All-America college football team consists of American football players selected to the All-America college football teams selected by various organizations in 1917. The selections were affected by the First World War. The Walter Camp Football Foundation lists no team in 1917. Camp posted an All-Service team in Collier's Weekly, and other organizations posted All-American teams. Walter Eckersall accidentally picked two players from Tech High School in an attempt to give credence to the first consensus national champion from the south, Georgia Tech. Walker Carpenter and Everett Strupper were the first two players from the Deep South ever selected All-American.

== All-Americans of 1917 ==
=== Ends ===
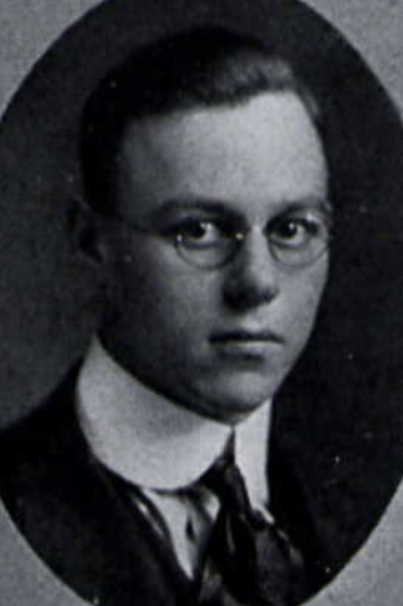
Charles Bolen.

- **Charles Bolen**, Ohio State (MS; WE-1; JV-2; PP-1; DJ)
- **Heinie Miller**, Penn (JV-1, DJ, WE-2)
- **Paul Robeson**, Rutgers (WC–2; MS; JV-2; PP-2)
- Clifford Carlson, Pittsburgh (WE-1; JV-1)
- Ernest H. Von Heimburg, Navy (PP-1)
- John Rasmussen, Nebraska; Grant (WC-1)
- William Jennings Gardner, Carlisle; Custer (WC-1)
- C. A. Coolidge, Harvard; Devens (PPS)
- Fred Heyman, Washington & Jefferson; Sherman (PPS)
- Ben Cubbage, Penn State; USAACS (NYT)
- George B. L. Green, Dartmouth; New Port Naval Res (NYT)
- Paul "Monk" Hager, West Virginia (PP-2)
- Elmer "Bird" Carroll, Washington & Jefferson (WE-2)
- Ellenberger, Cornell; Dix (WC-2)
- Mitchell, Mare Isl.; Marines (WC-2)
- Spike Dennie, Brown; Funston (WC-3)
- Hunt, Coast Naval Res. (WC-3)

=== Tackles ===
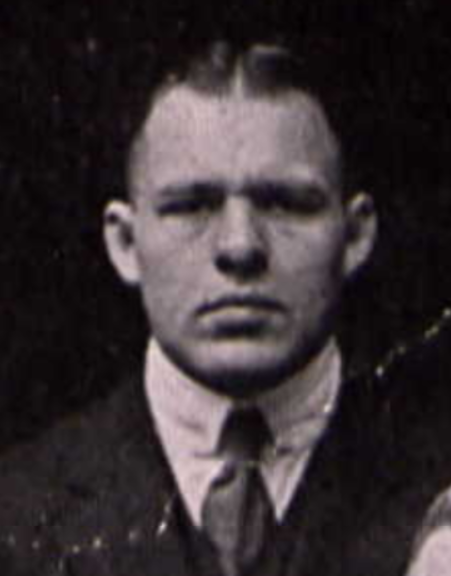
Alf Cobb.

- **George Hauser**, Minnesota (WE-1; JV-1; PP-1)
- **Alfred Cobb**, Syracuse (WE-2; JV-1; PP-1)
- Walker Carpenter, Georgia Tech (MS, DJ)
- Belford West, Colgate; Dix (College Football Hall of Fame) (WC-1, PPS)
- Pete Henry, Washington & Jefferson (MS)
- John Beckett, Oregon; Mare Isl. (College Football Hall of Fame) (WC-1)
- Albert Benbrook, Michigan; Ft. Sheridan (College Football Hall of Fame) (PPS)
- Pike Johnson, Washington & Lee; USAACS (NYT)
- Corbeau, Case; U. S. Marines Corps (NYT)
- Ernest Hubka, Nebraska (JV-2; PP-2)
- B. T. Williams, Oregon (JV-2; PP-2)
- Joseph Strauss, Penn (DJ)
- Joseph Murphy, Dartmouth (WE-2)
- Moriarty, Coast Naval Res. (WC-2)
- Hugh Blacklock, Mich. Ag; Great Lakes (WC-2)
- Robertson, Dartmouth; Dodge (WC-3)
- Zipper Lathrop, Notre Dame; Grant (WC-3)
- Harvey McCord, Tech High School (WE-1)

=== Guards ===
- **Dale Seis**, Pittsburgh (MS; PP-1, DJ)
- **Eugene Neely**, Dartmouth (JV-1)
- **Jock Sutherland**, Pittsburgh (JV-1)
- Clinton Black, Yale; Newport Res. (WC-1, PPS, NYT)
- Frank Culver, Michigan (JV-2; PP-1)
- Chris Schlachter, Syracuse; Newport Res. (PPS, NYT)
- C. J. Grabb, Brown (WE-1)
- H. M. Grey, Davidson (DJ)
- Ernest Allmendinger, Michigan; Ft. Sheridan (WC-1)
- Charles Lane, California (JV-2; PP-2)
- Herbert Dieter, Pennsylvania (PP-2)
- C. G. Higgins, Chicago (MS; WE-2)
- John Ulrich, Northwestern (WE-2)
- Allen Thurman, Virginia; Jackson (WC-2)
- Paul Withington, Harvard; Funston (WC-2)
- Snyder, 91st Division (WC-3)
- Holder, 91st Division (WC-3)
- Sid Sault, Tech High School (WE-1)

=== Centers ===
- **Frank Rydzewski**, Notre Dame (JV-1; PP-1)
- Russ Bailey, West Virginia (MS; WE-1; JV-2)
- Pup Phillips, Georgia Tech (DJ)
- John T. Callahan, Yale; Newport Res. (WC-1)
- Paul Des Jardien, Chicago; Ft. Sheridan (College Football Hall of Fame) (PPS)
- Lud Wray, Penn; U.S. Marine Corps (NYT)
- Alex Wray, Pennsylvania (PP-2)
- Oscar P. Lambert, Michigan (WE-2)
- Hommand, Kas.; Funston (WC-2)
- White, Yale; Jackson (WC-3)

=== Quarterbacks ===
Benny Boynton.

- **Benny Boynton**, Williams (College Football Hall of Fame) (MS; JV-1)
- Bill Ingram, Navy (JV-2 [hb]; PP-2)
- Ockie Anderson, Colgate; Dix (WC-2; PPS)
- Archie Weston, Michigan (WE-1)
- Raymond "Razor" Watkins, Colgate; Mineola (WC-1)
- Charles Thorne "Mike" Murphy, Yale; USAACS (NYT)
- Albert Hill, Georgia Tech (JV-2)
- Brennan, Fordham (WE-2)
- Harry Costello, Georgetown; Custer (WC-3)

=== Halfbacks ===
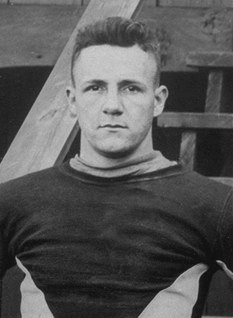
Everett Strupper.

- **Elmer Oliphant**, Army (College Football Hall of Fame) (MS; JV-1; PP-1, DJ)
- **Everett Strupper**, Georgia Tech (College Football Hall of Fame) (MS; JV-2; PP-1 [qb], DJ [qb])
- Charley Barrett, Cornell; Newport Res. (WC-2, PPS, NYT)
- Joe Guyon, Georgia Tech (College and Pro Football Hall of Fame) (PP-2, DJ)
- Eddie Casey, Harvard; Boston Navy Yard (College Football Hall of Fame) (WC-1)
- Wayland Minot, Harvard; Devens (WC-1)
- Bernard Gerrish, Dartmouth; Newport Res. (PPS)
- Johnny Scott, Lafayette; U.S. Marine Corps (NYT)
- "Scrubby" McCreight, Washington & Jefferson (PP-2)
- Arthur Hoffman, Cornell (WE-2)
- James J. Drummey, Tufts (WE-2)
- Fritz Shiverick, Cornell; Grant (WC-2)
- Edmund O'Boyle, Georgetown; Pelham (WC-3)
- Blair, Md.; Upton (WC-3)

=== Fullbacks ===
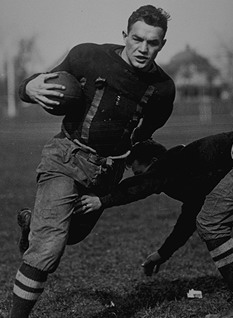
Chic Harley.

- **Chic Harley**, Ohio State (College Football Hall of Fame) (WE-1; JV-1; PP-1; DJ)
- George "Tank" McLaren, Pittsburgh (College Football Hall of Fame) (MS; WE-1 [HB]; JV-1; PP-2)
- Joseph Howard Berry, Jr., Pennsylvania (WE-1; JV-2; PP-1)
- Cedric C. Smith, Michigan; Great Lakes (WC-1)
- Eddie Mahan, Harvard; U.S. Marine Corps (College Football Hall of Fame) (PPS)
- Earl "Curley" Cramer, Hamline; USAACS (NYT)
- Bob Koehler, Northwestern (WE-2)
- Maxfield, Lafayette, Ft. Slocum (WC-2)
- Thayer, Pa.; Meade (WC-3)

=== Key ===
NCAA recognized selectors for 1917

- WC = Collier's Weekly All Service team as selected by Walter Camp
- JV = Jack Veiock of the International News Service
- PP = Paul Purman, noted sports writer whose All-American team was syndicated in newspapers across the United States, of the Newspaper Editors Association
- PPS = Paul Purman's All Service selection
- MS = Frank Menke Syndicate, by Frank G. Menke

Other selectors

- WE = Walter Eckersall, of the Chicago Tribune
- DJ = Dick Jemison, of the Atlanta Constitution.
- NYT = All Service eleven of The New York Times.

Bold = Consensus All-American

- 1 – First-team selection
- 2 – Second-team selection
- 3 – Third-team selection

== See also ==
- 1917 All-Big Ten Conference football team
- 1917 All-Eastern football team
- 1917 All-Pacific Coast football team
- 1917 All-Southern college football team
- 1917 All-Western college football team
