= 1916 Minnesota Golden Gophers football team =

American college football season

1916 Minnesota Golden Gophers football
- Conference: Western Conference
- Record: 6–1 (3–1 Western)
- Head coach: Henry L. Williams (17th season)
- Captain: Bert Baston
- Home stadium: Northrop Field

1916 Western Conference football standings
	Conf.					Overall
Team	W		L		T	W		L		T
Ohio State $	4	–	0	–	0	7	–	0	–	0
Northwestern	4	–	1	–	0	6	–	1	–	0
Minnesota	3	–	1	–	0	6	–	1	–	0
Chicago	3	–	3	–	0	3	–	4	–	0
Illinois	2	–	2	–	1	3	–	3	–	1
Wisconsin	1	–	2	–	1	4	–	2	–	1
Iowa	1	–	2	–	0	4	–	3	–	0
Indiana	0	–	3	–	1	2	–	4	–	1
Purdue	0	–	4	–	1	2	–	4	–	1
$ – Conference champion

The 1916 Minnesota Golden Gophers football team represented the University of Minnesota in the 1916 college football season. In their 17th year under head coach Henry L. Williams, the Golden Gophers compiled a 6–1 record (3–1 against Western Conference opponents) and outscored their opponents by a combined total of 348 to 28.

End Bert Baston and quarterback Shorty Long were named All-Americans by the Associated Press. Baston was also named an All-American by the Walter Camp Football Foundation. Baston, guard Conrad L. Eklund tackle Frank Mayer and fullback Arnold "Pudge" Wyman were named All-Big Ten first team.

== Schedule ==
Date	Opponent	Site	Result	Attendance	Source
October 7	South Dakota State*	Northrop Field; Minneapolis, MN	W 41–7		
October 14	North Dakota*	Northrop Field; Minneapolis, MN	W 47–7		
October 21	South Dakota*	Northrop Field; Minneapolis, MN	W 81–0		
October 28	Iowa	Northrop Field; Minneapolis, MN (rivalry)	W 67–0	5,000	
November 4	Illinois	Northrop Field; Minneapolis, MN	L 9–14	11,368	
November 18	Wisconsin	Northrop Field; Minneapolis, MN (rivalry)	W 54–0	24,000	
November 25	at Chicago	Stagg Field; Chicago, IL	W 49–0	22,000	
*Non-conference game
