= 1917 All-Big Ten Conference football team =

American college football all-star team

The 1917 All-Big Ten Conference football team consists of American football players selected to the All-Big Ten Conference teams chosen by various selectors for the 1917 college football season.

== All Big-Ten selections ==
=== Ends ===
- Charles Bolen, Ohio State (BB, JV, LA, LGS, LH, PD)
- W. M. Kelley, Wisconsin (BB, GWA, LA, LGS, PD)
- Dwight Peabody, Ohio State (LH)
- Charles Laun, Iowa (GWA)

=== Tackles ===
- George Hauser, Minnesota (BB, GWA, JV, LA, LGS, LH, PD)
- Ray Eklund, Minnesota (BB [guard], GWA [guard], JV, LGS [guard], LH, PD)
- Elmert T. Rundquist, Illinois (BB, GWA, LA [guard], LGS [guard])
- Harold J. Courtney, Ohio State (LA, LGS, PD [guard])

=== Guards ===
- Charles Higgins, Chicago (BB, GWA, LA, PD)
- Frank Culver, Michigan (JV, LH)
- Harry R. Shlaudeman, Illinois (JW, LH)

=== Centers ===
- Oscar Lambert, Michigan (JV, LGS, LH)
- Charles Carpenter, Wisconsin (GWA, PD)
- Russ Hathaway, Indiana (LA)
- Dutch Gorgas, Chicago (BB)

=== Quarterbacks ===
- Archie Weston, Michigan (JV, LA [halfback], LGS, LH)
- Eber Simpson, Wisconsin (BB, GWA [halfback], LA, PD)
- Howard Yerges Sr., Ohio State (GWA)

=== Halfbacks ===
- Chic Harley, Ohio State (BB, GWA, JV, LA, LGS, LH, PD)
- Cliff Sparks, Michigan (JV, LH)
- Lloyd Ellingwood, Northwestern (LGS, PD)
- Tad Wieman, Michigan (BB)

=== Fullbacks ===
- Bob Koehler, Northwestern (BB, GWA, LA, LGS, PD)
- Higgins, Chicago (JV, LH)

== Key ==
Bold = consensus choice by a majority of the selectors

BB = Bill Bailey in Chicago American

FM = Frank G. Menke, sporting editor of Newspaper Feature Service

GWA = G. W. Axelson in Chicago Herald

JV = Jack Veiock

LA = Leonard Adams, football editor of Chicago Journal

LGS = Lambert G. Sullivan, football editor of Chicago Daily News

LH = Luther A. Huston

PD = Paddy Driscoll in Chicago Examiner

== See also ==
- 1917 College Football All-America Team
- 1917 All-Western college football team
