= 1916 Ohio State Buckeyes football team =

American college football season

1916 Ohio State Buckeyes football

Western Conference champion
- Conference: Western Conference, Ohio Athletic Conference
- Record: 7–0 (4–0 Western, 3–0 OAC)
- Head coach: John Wilce (4th season)
- Offensive scheme: Heavy run
- Base defense: Multi
- Home stadium: Ohio Field

Uniform
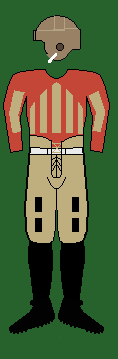

1916 Western Conference football standings
	Conf.					Overall
Team	W		L		T	W		L		T
Ohio State $	4	–	0	–	0	7	–	0	–	0
Northwestern	4	–	1	–	0	6	–	1	–	0
Minnesota	3	–	1	–	0	6	–	1	–	0
Chicago	3	–	3	–	0	3	–	4	–	0
Illinois	2	–	2	–	1	3	–	3	–	1
Wisconsin	1	–	2	–	1	4	–	2	–	1
Iowa	1	–	2	–	0	4	–	3	–	0
Indiana	0	–	3	–	1	2	–	4	–	1
Purdue	0	–	4	–	1	2	–	4	–	1
$ – Conference champion

1916 Ohio Athletic Conference football standings
	Conf.					Overall
Team	W		L		T	W		L		T
Miami (OH) $	6	–	0	–	1	7	–	0	–	1
Mount Union	6	–	1	–	0	8	–	2	–	0
Denison	5	–	0	–	2	5	–	1	–	2
Ohio	4	–	1	–	1	5	–	2	–	1
Wooster	5	–	2	–	0	6	–	2	–	0
Case	4	–	3	–	0	5	–	5	–	0
Ohio Wesleyan	2	–	2	–	2	2	–	3	–	2
Western Reserve	3	–	4	–	0	3	–	7	–	0
Akron	2	–	4	–	0	2	–	7	–	0
Ohio Northern	2	–	5	–	0	3	–	7	–	0
Kenyon	2	–	5	–	0	2	–	7	–	0
Wittenberg	0	–	5	–	1	2	–	5	–	2
Cincinnati	0	–	6	–	1	0	–	8	–	2
Baldwin–Wallace	0	–	1	–	0	0	–	2	–	0
Oberlin	0	–	5	–	0	0	–	7	–	0
Ohio State *	3	–	0	–	0	7	–	0	–	0
$ – Conference champion; * – did not complete for championship

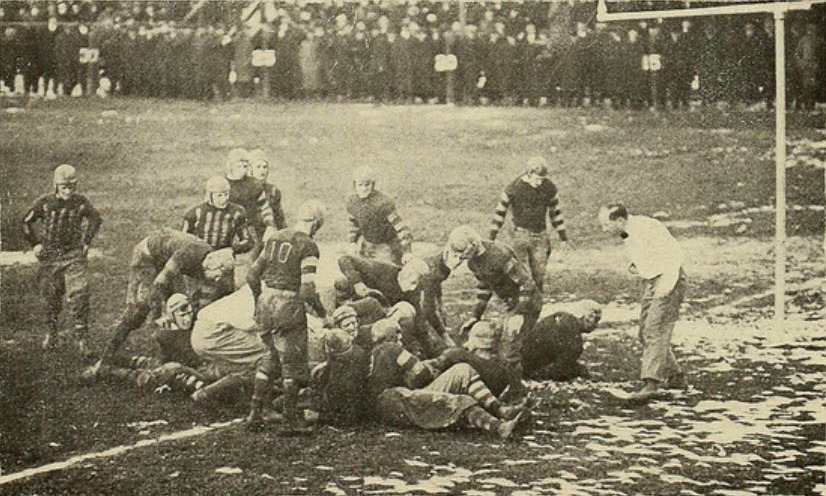
Ohio State scoring a touchdown against Case, while playing at Van Horn Field in University Circle, Cleveland.

The 1916 Ohio State Buckeyes football was an American football team that represented Ohio State University as a member of the Western Conference and the Ohio Athletic Conference (OAC) during the 1916 college football season. In their fourth year under head coach John Wilce, the Buckeyes compiled a perfect 7–0 record and outscored opponents 258 to 29. Ohio State was 4–0 Western Conference opponents, winning the conference championship, the first in school history.

Half of the team's points were tallied in a 128–0 victory over Oberlin. The 128 points scored against Oberlin remains a single-game Ohio State record.

Halfback Chic Harley was a consensus first-team pick on the 1916 All-America college football team. Other notable players included end Charles Bolen, center Ferdinand Holtkamp, and tackle Bob Karch.

== Schedule ==
Date	Opponent	Site	Result	Source
October 7	Ohio Wesleyan	Ohio Field; Columbus, OH	W 12–0	
October 14	Oberlin	Ohio Field; Columbus, OH	W 128–0	
October 21	at Illinois	Illinois Field; Champaign, IL (rivalry)	W 7–6	
November 4	Wisconsin	Ohio Field; Columbus, OH	W 14-13	
November 11	Indiana	Ohio Field; Columbus, OH	W 46–7	
November 18	at Case	Van Horn Field; Cleveland, OH	W 28–0	
November 25	Northwestern	Ohio Field; Columbus, OH	W 23–3	
