= 1916 Indiana Hoosiers football team =

American college football season

1916 Indiana Hoosiers football
- Conference: Western Conference
- Record: 2–4–1 (0–3–1 Western)
- Head coach: Ewald O. Stiehm (1st season)
- Captain: Freal McIntosh
- Home stadium: Jordan Field

1916 Western Conference football standings
	Conf.					Overall
Team	W		L		T	W		L		T
Ohio State $	4	–	0	–	0	7	–	0	–	0
Northwestern	4	–	1	–	0	6	–	1	–	0
Minnesota	3	–	1	–	0	6	–	1	–	0
Chicago	3	–	3	–	0	3	–	4	–	0
Illinois	2	–	2	–	1	3	–	3	–	1
Wisconsin	1	–	2	–	1	4	–	2	–	1
Iowa	1	–	2	–	0	4	–	3	–	0
Indiana	0	–	3	–	1	2	–	4	–	1
Purdue	0	–	4	–	1	2	–	4	–	1
$ – Conference champion

The 1916 Indiana Hoosiers football team was an American football team that represented Indiana University Bloomington during the 1916 college football season. In their first season under head coach Ewald O. Stiehm, the Hoosiers compiled a 2–4–1 record and finished in eighth place in the Western Conference. They won games against DePauw (20–0) and Florida (14–3), played Purdue to a scoreless tie, and lost to Chicago (22–0), Tufts (12–10), Northwestern (7–0), and Ohio State (46–7).

== Schedule ==
Date	Opponent	Site	Result	Attendance	Source
September 30	DePauw*	Jordan Field; Bloomington, IN	W 20–0		
October 14	at Chicago	Stagg Field; Chicago, IL	L 0–22		
October 28	vs. Tufts*	Washington Park; Indianapolis, IN	L 10–12		
November 4	Northwestern	Jordan Field; Bloomington, IN	L 0–7		
November 11	at Ohio State	Ohio Field; Columbus, OH	L 7–46		
November 18	Florida*	Jordan Field; Bloomington, IN	W 14–3	5,000	
November 25	at Purdue	Stuart Field; West Lafayette, IN (rivalry)	T 0–0		
*Non-conference game

== Personnel ==
=== Roster ===
Name	Position	Year	Ref.
Weiland			
Murchie			
Mullett			
Conkle			
McIntosh, Freal H. "Mac"(C)			
Whisman			
Ingles			
Keever			
Hiatt			
Gray			
McCoy			
Beck			
Pope			
Hess, Arthur			
Buschman, Charles Severin			
Wiley			
Julius			
Stutesman, Frank M.			
Hess, Walter			
Bowser			
Erehart, Archie Dean			
Hathaway, Russell Grant			

=== Staffing ===
- Ewald O. Stiehm, head coach
- Whisman, assistant
- Jesse Ferguson, trainer
