= 1916 Northwestern Purple football team =

American college football season

1916 Northwestern Purple football
- Conference: Western Conference
- Record: 6–1 (4–1 Western)
- Head coach: Fred J. Murphy (3rd season)
- Captain: A. H. Henry
- Home stadium: Northwestern Field

1916 Western Conference football standings
| | Conf. | | | | | Overall |
| Team | W | | L | | T | W | | L | | T |
|---|---|---|---|---|---|---|---|---|---|---|
| Ohio State $ | 4 | – | 0 | – | 0 | 7 | – | 0 | – | 0 |
| Northwestern | 4 | – | 1 | – | 0 | 6 | – | 1 | – | 0 |
| Minnesota | 3 | – | 1 | – | 0 | 6 | – | 1 | – | 0 |
| Chicago | 3 | – | 3 | – | 0 | 3 | – | 4 | – | 0 |
| Illinois | 2 | – | 2 | – | 1 | 3 | – | 3 | – | 1 |
| Wisconsin | 1 | – | 2 | – | 1 | 4 | – | 2 | – | 1 |
| Iowa | 1 | – | 2 | – | 0 | 4 | – | 3 | – | 0 |
| Indiana | 0 | – | 3 | – | 1 | 2 | – | 4 | – | 1 |
| Purdue | 0 | – | 4 | – | 1 | 2 | – | 4 | – | 1 |
$ – Conference champion

The 1916 Northwestern Purple football team was an American football team that represented Northwestern University during the 1916 college football season. In its third season under head coach Fred J. Murphy, the team compiled a 6–1 record and finished in second place in the Western Conference. The team's sole loss was to conference champion Ohio State.

== Schedule ==
| Date | Opponent | Site | Result | Attendance | Source |
|---|---|---|---|---|---|
| October 7 | Lake Forest* | Northwestern Field; Evanston, IL | W 26–7 | | |
| October 21 | at Chicago | Stagg Field; Chicago, IL | W 10–0 | | |
| October 28 | Drake* | Northwestern Field; Evanston, IL | W 40–6 | | |
| November 4 | at Indiana | Jordan Field; Bloomington, IN | W 7–0 | | |
| November 10 | Iowa | Northwestern Field; Evanston, IL | W 20–13 | | |
| November 18 | Purdue | Northwestern Field; Evanston, IL | W 38–6 | | |
| November 25 | at Ohio State | Ohio Field; Columbus, OH | L 3–23 | | |
*Non-conference game
