= 1916 Iowa Hawkeyes football team =

American college football season

1916 Iowa Hawkeyes football
- Conference: Western Conference
- Record: 4–3 (1–2 Western)
- Head coach: Howard Jones (1st season)
- Offensive scheme: Single-wing
- Captain: Charles Laun
- Home stadium: Iowa Field

Uniform
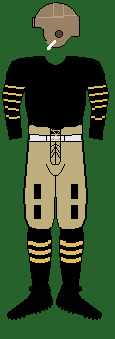

1916 Western Conference football standings
	Conf.					Overall
Team	W		L		T	W		L		T
Ohio State $	4	–	0	–	0	7	–	0	–	0
Northwestern	4	–	1	–	0	6	–	1	–	0
Minnesota	3	–	1	–	0	6	–	1	–	0
Chicago	3	–	3	–	0	3	–	4	–	0
Illinois	2	–	2	–	1	3	–	3	–	1
Wisconsin	1	–	2	–	1	4	–	2	–	1
Iowa	1	–	2	–	0	4	–	3	–	0
Indiana	0	–	3	–	1	2	–	4	–	1
Purdue	0	–	4	–	1	2	–	4	–	1
$ – Conference champion

The 1916 Iowa Hawkeyes football team was an American football team that represented the University of Iowa as a member of the Western Conference during the 1916 college football season. In their first year under head coach Howard Jones, the Hawkeyes compiled a 4–3 record (1–2 in conference games), finished in seventh place in the Western Conference, and were outscored by a total of 156 to 121.

The team played its home games at Iowa Field in Iowa City, Iowa.

== Schedule ==
Date	Opponent	Site	Result	Attendance
October 7	Cornell (IA)*	Iowa Field; Iowa City, IA	W 31–6	
October 14	Grinnell*	Iowa Field; Iowa City, IA	W 17–7	
October 21	Purdue	Iowa Field; Iowa City, IA	W 24–6	
October 28	at Minnesota	Northrop Field; Minneapolis, MN (rivalry)	L 0–67	5,000
November 11	at Northwestern	Northwestern Field; Evanston, IL	L 13–20	
November 18	at Iowa State*	State Field; Ames, IA (rivalry)	W 19–16	
November 25	Nebraska*^{†}	Iowa Field; Iowa City, IA (rivalry)	L 17–34	
*Non-conference game; ^{†}Homecoming
