= 1925 Macalester Macs football team =

American college football season

1925 Macalester Macs football

MIAC champion
- Conference: Minnesota Intercollegiate Athletic Conference
- Record: 4–2–1 (4–0 MIAC)
- Head coach: Frank A. R. Mayer (1st season)
- Home stadium: Shaw Field

1925 Minnesota Intercollegiate Athletic Conference football standings
	Conf.					Overall
Team	W		L		T	W		L		T
Macalester $	4	–	0	–	0	4	–	2	–	1
Gustavus Adolphus	3	–	1	–	0	5	–	1	–	0
St. Olaf	3	–	2	–	0	4	–	5	–	0
Concordia (MN)	1	–	2	–	0	2	–	2	–	1
Hamline	1	–	2	–	0	2	–	6	–	0
Saint John's (MN)	0	–	5	–	0	0	–	6	–	0
$ – Conference champion

The 1925 Macalester Macs football team represented Macalester College as a member of the Minnesota Intercollegiate Athletic Conference (MIAC) during the 1925 college football season. Led by first-year head coach Frank A. R. Mayer, the Macs compiled an overall record 4–2–1 with a mark of 4–0 in conference play, winning the MIAC title. Macalester played home games at Shaw Field in Saint Paul, Minnesota.

== Schedule ==
Date	Time	Opponent	Site	Result	Source
September 27		River Falls Normal*	Shaw Field; Saint Paul, MN	T 12–12	
October 3		Minneapolis Oaks*	Shaw Field; Saint Paul, MN	W 6–0 (practice)	
October 10		Gustavus Adolphus	Shaw Field; Saint Paul, MN	W 34–7	
October 23	2:30 p.m.	at Hamline	Hamline field; Saint Paul, MN	W 26–0	
October 31	2:00 p.m.	Carleton*	Shaw Field; Saint Paul, MN	L 6–7	
November 7		Luther*	Shaw Field; Saint Paul, MN	L 0–22	
November 14		Saint John's (MN)	Shaw Field; Saint Paul, MN	W 18–7	
November 21		at St. Olaf	Northfield, MN	W 28–6	
*Non-conference game; All times are in Central time
