= John S. Callan =

American politician (1890–1950)

Member of the Nebraska Legislature from the 21st district
- In office January 7, 1947 – August 24, 1950
- Preceded by: Ladd Hubka
- Succeeded by: Joseph Shalla
- In office January 3, 1939 – January 5, 1943
- Preceded by: Henry Brandt
- Succeeded by: Ladd Hubka

Member of the Nebraska State Senate from the 16th district
- In office January 3, 1933 – January 5, 1937
- Preceded by: Kenneth S. Wherry
- Succeeded by: Position abolished

Personal details
- Born: April 20, 1890 Odell, Nebraska
- Died: August 24, 1950 (aged 60) Odell, Nebraska
- Party: Democratic
- Spouse: Agnes Armstrong (m. 1919)
- Children: 2 (including Clair)
- Education: University of Nebraska
- Occupation: Hardware and implement dealer

Military service
- Allegiance: United States
- Branch/service: United States Army

John S. Callan (April 20, 1890 – August 24, 1950) was a Democratic politician from Nebraska who served in the Nebraska State Senate from 1933 to 1937 and as a member of the Nebraska Legislature from the 21st district from 1939 to 1943 and again from 1947 until his death in 1950.

== Early life ==
Callan was born in Odell, Nebraska, in 1890, where his father, Thomas R. Callan, operated a hardware store. He graduated from Odell High School and attended the University of Nebraska. Callan served in the U.S. Army during World War II. Upon returning to Odell, he served as the city postmaster and operated the Beatrice Implement Company.

== Nebraska State Senate ==
In 1932, when Republican State Senator Kenneth S. Wherry ran for Governor rather than seek re-election, Callan ran to succeed him in the 16th district. He won the Democratic nomination and defeated the Republican nominee, Arthur J. Floyd, in the general election.

Callan was re-elected in 1934 over Republican C. F. Overbeck, winning 58 percent of the vote.

== Nebraska Legislature ==
After the Senate and the Nebraska House of Representatives were abolished and reorganized as the unicameral legislature, Callan ran in the newly created 21st district. He was defeated by State Representative Henry Brandt, winning 43 percent of the vote to Brandt's 57 percent.

In 1938, Callan challenged Brandt for re-election, and defeated him. Callan faced Brandt again in 1940, and narrowly won re-election.

Callan declined to seek re-election in 1942, and instead ran for the U.S. House of Representatives from the 1st district. He lost the Democratic primary to Ralph G. Brooks, the superintendent of schools in Wymore, and was succeeded in the state legislature by Ladd Hubka.

In 1946, Callan challenged Hubka for re-election, and defeated him with 57 percent of the vote. He was re-elected in 1948.

Callan ran for re-election in 1950. However, on August 24, 1950, shortly after winning renomination in the nonpartisan primary, Callan died.

== Legacy ==
His son, Clair A. Callan, would later be elected to represent Nebraska's 1st congressional district in Congress from 1965 to 1967.
