= Clair A. Callan =

American politician (1920–2005)

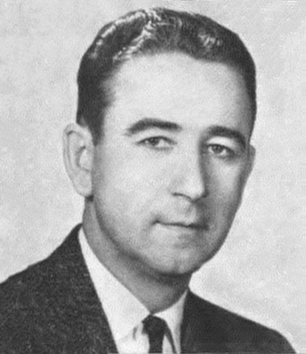

Member of the U.S. House of Representatives from Nebraska's 1st district
- In office January 3, 1965 – January 3, 1967
- Preceded by: Ralph F. Beermann
- Succeeded by: Robert Vernon Denney

Personal details
- Born: Clair Armstrong Callan; March 29, 1920 Odell, Nebraska, U.S.
- Died: May 28, 2005 (aged 85) Fairbury, Nebraska, U.S.
- Party: Democratic

Clair Armstrong Callan (March 29, 1920 – May 28, 2005) was an American politician from Nebraska. A member of the Democratic Party, he served in the United States House of Representatives for Nebraska's 1st congressional district for a single term from 1965 to 1967. He is the most recent Democrat to represent Nebraska in the House of Representatives from outside the second district.

== Early life, education, and career ==
Born in Odell, Nebraska, Callan graduated from Odell High School in 1938 and Nebraska State Teachers College (now Peru State College) in 1942. His father, John S. Callan, served in the state legislature for thirteen years from the 1930s to 1950. He served as lieutenant in the United States Navy during World War II on a destroyer in the Pacific Theater.

After the war, Callan returned to Odell to work for his family's hardware business, Callan Hardware and Implement.

== Political career ==
Callan served on the Odell Village Board, Odell School Board, Gage County School Reorganization Board, Gage County Fair Board, and the Gage County Extension Board. He was chairman of both the Governor's Committee on State Government Reorganization Board and the Nebraska Power Review Board. He also worked as a farmer.

In 1962, Callan ran to represent Nebraska's 1st congressional district, losing to incumbent Republican Ralph Beermann by a margin of 50%–44%. He sought a rematch in 1964, defeating Beermann by a margin of 51%–49% in a year when Democrats gained 36 House seats nationwide. Callan served from January 3, 1965, to January 3, 1967. He was narrowly defeated for reelection in 1966 by Republican Robert V. Denney, and lost again in a rematch to Denney in 1968.

While in Congress, Callan helped develop legislation that led to the creations of Medicare and Medicaid, as well as the Voting Rights Act of 1965.

== Post-political career ==
In 1970, when Denney decided not so seek reelection, Callan ran as an independent when he failed to receive the Democratic nomination, winning 26% in a three way race and finishing ahead of the Democratic nominee. He was Deputy Administrator of the Rural Electrification Administration from 1967 to 1968 and president of the Allied Industries International, Inc. and Agri-Tech in Nashville, Tennessee.

He died on May 28, 2005, in Fairbury, Nebraska.

U.S. House of Representatives
Preceded by Ralph F. Beermann (R)	Member of the U.S. House of Representatives from Nebraska's 1st congressional district January 3, 1965 – January 3, 1967	Succeeded by Robert Vernon Denney (R)
