= Joseph Shalla =

American politician (1892–1974)

Member of the Nebraska Legislature from the 21st district
- In office January 2, 1951 – January 6, 1953
- Preceded by: John S. Callan
- Succeeded by: Ernie Hubka

Personal details
- Born: April 3, 1892 near Odell, Nebraska
- Died: April 9, 1974 (aged 82) Beatrice, Nebraska
- Party: Democratic
- Spouse(s): Jennie Pribyl (m. 1915, died) Verna Overbeck (m. 1951)
- Children: 3
- Occupation: Farmer, consultant

Joseph P. Shalla (April 3, 1892 – April 9, 1974) was a Democratic politician from Nebraska who served as a member of the Nebraska Legislature from the 21st district from 1951 to 1953.

== Early life ==
Shalla was born near Odell, Nebraska, in 1892. He was a farmer, and maintained one of the largest Holstein herds in the state. Shalla later worked as a consultant for the First National Bank in Beatrice and was elected to the local school board, and to the Glenwood Township Board. He was a local supervisor for the Farm Security Administration and the Production Marketing Administration.

== Nebraska Legislature ==
In 1950, State Senator John S. Callan died after winning renomination at the nonpartisan primary. Shalla gathered signatures to run in the general election to succeed him in the 21st district, and ran against L. K. Ekwall. He defeated Ekwall in the general election, receiving 57 percent of the vote. He declined to seek re-election in 1952.

Shalla ran for the legislature again in 1966, challenging State Senator Fred Carstens for re-election in the 30th district. Though the race was formally nonpartisan, Shalla was a registered Democrat and Carstens was a registered Republican. Carstens ultimately defeated Shalla with 55 percent of the vote in the general election.

== Death ==
Shalla died on April 9, 1974.
