= Bird Carroll =

American football player (1896–1982)

No. 12 (1921), 23 (1922), 10 (1923, 1925)
- Position: End

Personal information
- Born: July 25, 1896; Scottdale, Pennsylvania, U.S.
- Died: August 6, 1982 (aged 86); Winter Park, Florida, U.S.
- Listed height: 5 ft 8 in (1.73 m)
- Listed weight: 185 lb (84 kg)

Career information
- College: Washington & Jefferson College

Career history
- Canton Bulldogs (1921–1925)

Awards and highlights
- 2× NFL champion (1922, 1923); 2× Canton Daily News: 1st team All-NFL (1922, 1923)
- Stats at Pro Football Reference

Elmer Ellsworth "Bird" Carroll was a professional football player during the early years of the National Football League (NFL) with the Canton Bulldogs. He attended Washington & Jefferson College. Caroll won NFL championships with the Canton Bulldogs in 1922 and 1923.

== Notes ==
- Career statistics from NFL.com · Pro Football Reference ·
