= Bert Baston =

American football player and coach (1894–1979)

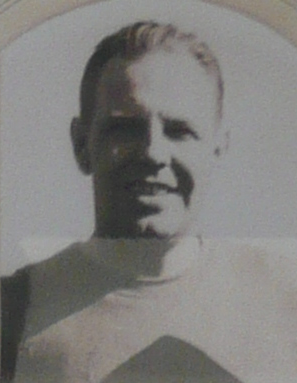

Profile
- Position: End

Personal information
- Born: December 3, 1894; St. Louis Park, Minnesota, U.S.
- Listed height: 6 ft 1 in (1.85 m)
- Listed weight: 170 lb (77 kg)

Career information
- High school: St. Louis Park
- College: Minnesota (1914–1916)

Career history
- Cleveland Tigers (1920)

Awards and highlights
- 2× Consensus All-American (1915, 1916); 3× First-team All-Western (1914–1916)

Career APFC statistics
- Games played: 8
- Games started: 7
- Stats at Pro Football Reference
- College Football Hall of Fame

Albert Preston Baston (December 3, 1894 – November 16, 1979) was an American football end who played for the Cleveland Tigers of the American Professional Football Conference (APFC) for one season. He played college football for the Minnesota Golden Gophers, where he was an All-American and one of the first great catchers of the forward pass. He was awarded the Navy Cross for "extraordinary heroism" in World War I. He was elected to the College Football Hall of Fame in 1954

== Early life and college career ==
Baston was a sports phenomenon in high school, where he played for Saint Louis Park High School in St. Louis Park, Minnesota. Entering the University of Minnesota to study law, he played football on the school's 'elevens' at left end for three seasons beginning in 1914. He was captain of the team his final year. Walter Camp named him on his All-American team both in 1915 and in 1916. His team was recognized with a national championship in 1915, prior to the modern "consensus system."

In addition to his football honors, while at Minnesota Baston was a member of Phi Sigma Kappa fraternity. He was president of the Athletic Board of Control, a member of the University Senate, of the Junior Ball Association, elected to Iron Wedge, a senior society, and to Phi Delta Phi international legal honor society, along with various local clubs.

== World War I service ==
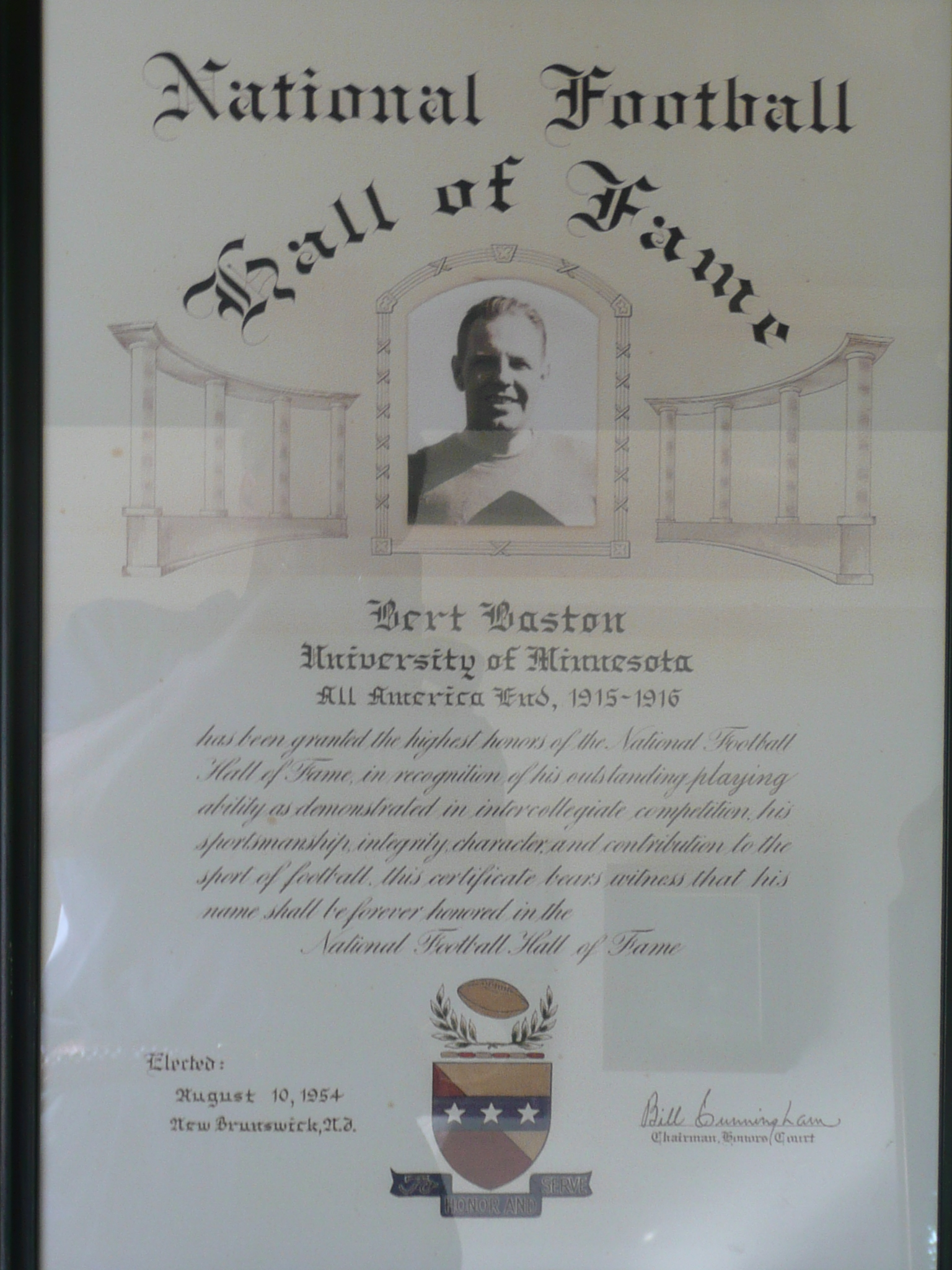
Bert Baston, National Football Hall of Fame, induction award

During World War I Baston served with the 17th Company of the 5th Marine Regiment. He was a captain and fought in France. He suffered a critical leg injury while serving in the Battle of Belleau Wood, with a hole in his leg "big enough to stick a broom handle through," according to family lore. Awarded the Navy Cross, his official citation reads:

The Navy Cross is presented to Albert P. Baston, First Lieutenant, U.S. Marine Corps, for extraordinary heroism while serving with the 5th Regiment (Marines), 2d Division, A.E.F. in action near Château-Thierry, France. Although shot in both legs while leading his platoon through the woods at Hill 142, near Château-Thierry, France, on June 6, 1918, Lieutenant Baston refused treatment until he had personally assured himself that every man in his platoon was under cover and in good firing position.

The story of Baston's 5th Marine Regiment forms a key lesson of Marine Corps lore: It was in WWI and at Belleau Wood where Marines of the 5th earned the nickname Devil Dogs.

== Business and coaching careers ==
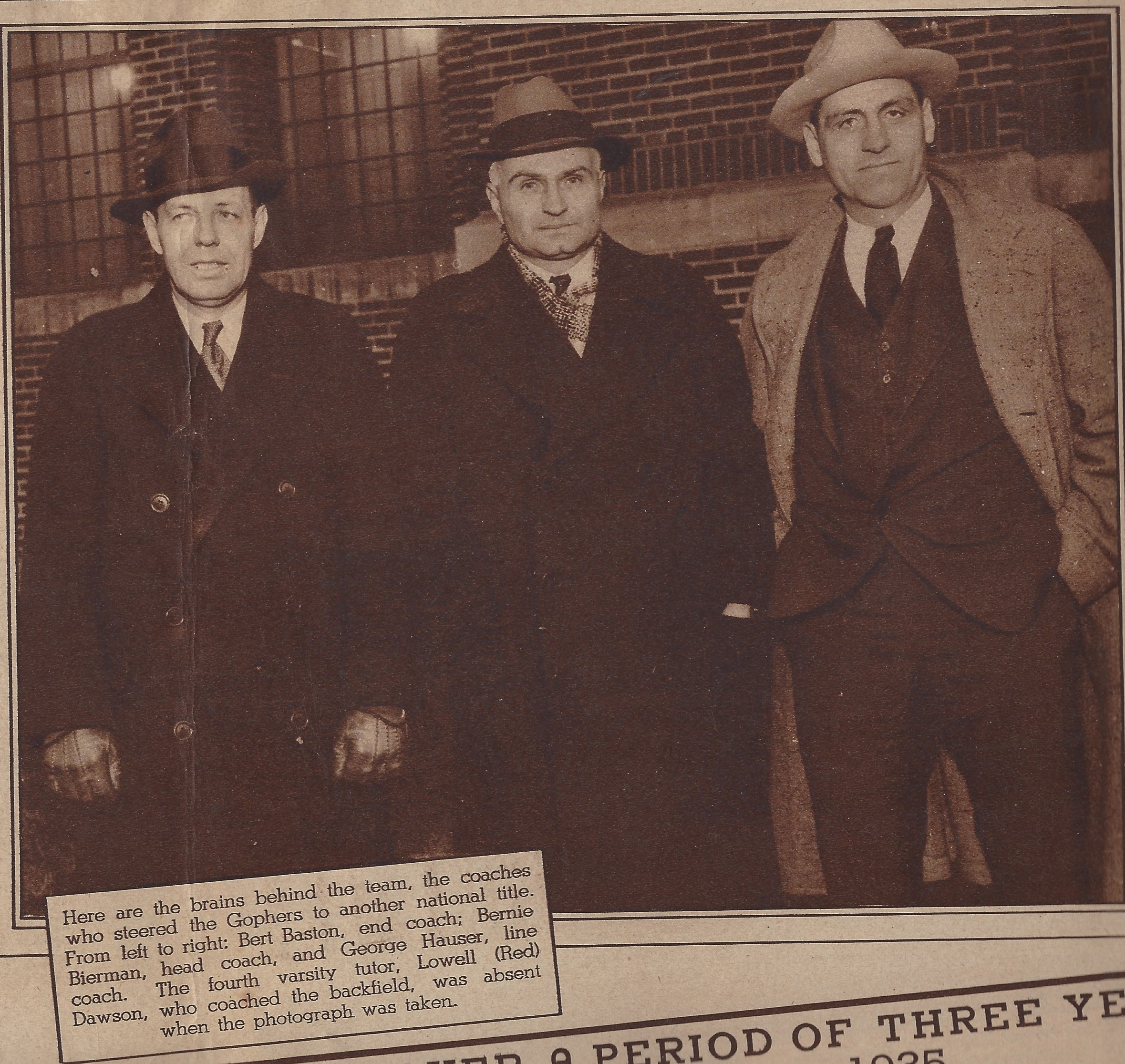
The Minnesota's Golden Gophers, 1935 National Champions, coaches: Bert Baston, end coach; Bernie Bierman, head coach; and George Hauser, line coach. The fourth varsity tutor, Lowek (Red) Dawson, who coached the backfield, was absent when the photograph was taken

Baston spent almost a year in the hospital, and when he got out he started a bakery in Detroit. He married Ruby Laird in 1920. Baston played that same year for the Cleveland Tigers, an early NFL team. Eventually the couple returned to Minneapolis and started the Bert Baston Chevrolet Co. at 3038 Hennepin Avenue (1933), a site now redeveloped into commercial space. His sales manager during the 1930s was George Richard Baston, the only surviving son of Bert's uncle, John Judson Baston.

Baston served as the Minnesota Gophers' ends coach from 1930 to the 1941 and again from 1946 to 1950.

== World War II service ==
In World War II Baston again was called into service, this time in the North Africa Campaign as a colonel in the Marines, where he commanded a battalion that repaired equipment ranging from jeeps to rocket guns for armies in the European and African Theaters.

Baston and Ruby had two children: Fred, who also served in World War II and in the Korean War, and a daughter, Priscilla.

== Later life ==
Baston resumed his automotive career after the war. The 1947 St. Louis Park City directory listed his Baston-Barington Chevrolet Co. at 2612 Lyndale Avenue. He remained active in the community and was appointed as General Chairman of the 1948 Minneapolis Aquatennial. Baston moved to St. Cloud later in life and opened a dealership there.

In 1954, he was inducted into the College Football Hall of Fame. Baston died in St. Cloud on November 15, 1979, and is buried at Lakewood Cemetery in Minneapolis.
