= 1916 Purdue Boilermakers football team =

American college football season

1916 Purdue Boilermakers football
- Conference: Western Conference
- Record: 2–4–1 (0–4–1 Western)
- Head coach: Cleo A. O'Donnell (1st season)
- Captain: Paul H. Hake
- Home stadium: Stuart Field

1916 Western Conference football standings
	Conf.					Overall
Team	W		L		T	W		L		T
Ohio State $	4	–	0	–	0	7	–	0	–	0
Northwestern	4	–	1	–	0	6	–	1	–	0
Minnesota	3	–	1	–	0	6	–	1	–	0
Chicago	3	–	3	–	0	3	–	4	–	0
Illinois	2	–	2	–	1	3	–	3	–	1
Wisconsin	1	–	2	–	1	4	–	2	–	1
Iowa	1	–	2	–	0	4	–	3	–	0
Indiana	0	–	3	–	1	2	–	4	–	1
Purdue	0	–	4	–	1	2	–	4	–	1
$ – Conference champion

The 1916 Purdue Boilermakers football team was an American football team that represented Purdue University during the 1916 college football season. In their first season under head coach Cleo A. O'Donnell, the Boilermakers compiled a 2–4–1 record, finished in last place in the Western Conference with an 0–4–1 record against conference opponents, and were outscored by their opponents by a total of 99 to 67. Paul H. Hake was the team captain.

== Schedule ==
Date	Time	Opponent	Site	Result	Source
October 7	3:00 p.m.	DePauw*	Stuart Field; West Lafayette, IN	W 13–0	
October 14		Wabash	Stuart Field; West Lafayette, IN	W 28–7	
October 21		at Iowa	Iowa Field; Iowa City, IA	L 6–24	
October 28		Illinois	Stuart Field; West Lafayette, IN (rivalry)	L 7–14	
November 4		at Chicago	Stagg Field; Chicago, IL (rivalry)	L 7–16	
November 19		at Northwestern	Northwestern Field; Evanston, IL	L 6–38	
November 25		Indiana	Stuart Field; West Lafayette, IN (Old Oaken Bucket)	T 0–0	
*Non-conference game

== Roster ==
- R. T. Abrell, HB
- Raymond Arbuckle, G
- C. A. Bartlett, G
- Bill Berns, T
- Charlie Buechner, T
- Ray Edwards, E
- J. R. Fawcett, HB
- Paul Hake, E
- Herbert L. Hart, C
- Harold Hickey, E
- Ken Huffine, FB
- Robert Hume, QB
- F. O. Jordan, G
- G. G. Mize, E
- M. J. Proud, G
- Herb Randolph, E
- Warner Van Aken, HB
