= 1916 Chicago Maroons football team =

American college football season

1916 Chicago Maroons football
- Conference: Western Conference
- Record: 3–4 (3–3 Western)
- Head coach: Amos Alonzo Stagg (25th season)
- Home stadium: Stagg Field

1916 Western Conference football standings
	Conf.					Overall
Team	W		L		T	W		L		T
Ohio State $	4	–	0	–	0	7	–	0	–	0
Northwestern	4	–	1	–	0	6	–	1	–	0
Minnesota	3	–	1	–	0	6	–	1	–	0
Chicago	3	–	3	–	0	3	–	4	–	0
Illinois	2	–	2	–	1	3	–	3	–	1
Wisconsin	1	–	2	–	1	4	–	2	–	1
Iowa	1	–	2	–	0	4	–	3	–	0
Indiana	0	–	3	–	1	2	–	4	–	1
Purdue	0	–	4	–	1	2	–	4	–	1
$ – Conference champion

The 1916 Chicago Maroons football team was an American football team that represented the University of Chicago during the 1916 college football season. In their 25th season under head coach Amos Alonzo Stagg, the Maroons compiled a 3–4 record, finished in fourth place in the Western Conference, and were outscored by their opponents by a combined total of 110 to 65.

In the first game of the season, Carleton College traveled to Chicago and beat the Maroons 7-0 in a shocking upset.

== Schedule ==
Date	Opponent	Site	Result	Attendance	Source
October 7	Carleton*	Stagg Field; Chicago, IL	L 0–7		
October 14	Indiana	Stagg Field; Chicago, IL	W 22–0		
October 21	Northwestern	Stagg Field; Chicago, IL	L 0–10		
October 28	at Wisconsin	Randall Field; Madison, WI	L 7–30		
November 4	Purdue	Stagg Field; Chicago, IL (rivalry)	W 16–7		
November 18	at Illinois	Illinois Field; Champaign, IL	W 20–7	831	
November 25	Minnesota	Stagg Field; Chicago, IL	L 0–49	22,000	
*Non-conference game
