= Frank A. R. Mayer =

American football player and coach (1895–1973)

Biographical details
- Born: April 24, 1895; East Grand Forks, Minnesota, U.S.
- Died: August 3, 1973 (aged 78); Minneapolis, Minnesota, U.S.

Playing career
- 1914–1916: Minnesota
- Position: Tackle

Coaching career (HC unless noted)
- 1925–1929: Macalester

Head coaching record
- Overall: 16–17–2

Accomplishments and honors

Championships
- 1 MIAC (1925)

Awards
- All-American (1916); All-Western (1916); All-Western Conference (1916)

Frank A. R. Mayer (April 24, 1895 – August 3, 1973) was an American college football player and coach. He served as the head football coach at Macalester College in St. Paul, Minnesota from 1925 to 1929. Mayer was a standout player at the University of Minnesota, earning All-American honors in 1916.

Mayer worked as a reporter for the Minneapolis Daily News and the Minneapolis Journal. He practiced law in St. Paul during the time he coached at Macalester. During World War II, Mayer served as secretary to Marvin L. Kline, the mayor of Minneapolis. He was later the public relations director for the North Central Association of Colleges and Schools. Mayer died on August 3, 1973.

== Head coaching record ==
Year	Team	Overall	Conference	Standing	Bowl/playoffs
Macalester Macs (Minnesota Intercollegiate Athletic Conference) (1925–1929)
1925	Macalester	4–2–1	4–0	1st	
1927	Macalester	5–3	3–1	2nd	
1927	Macalester	3–4	3–2	T–2nd	
1928	Macalester	3–4	2–4	T–6th	
1929	Macalester	1–4–1	1–4–1	8th	
Macalester:		16–17–2	13–11–1		
Total:		16–17–2			
National championship Conference title Conference division title or championship game berth
