= Russ Bailey =

American football player and surgeon (1897–1949)

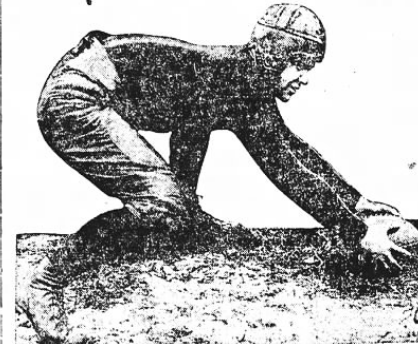

Profile
- Position: Center

Personal information
- Born: October 17, 1897; Weston, West Virginia, U.S.
- Died: September 15, 1949 (aged 51); Wheeling, West Virginia, U.S.
- Listed height: 5 ft 11 in (1.80 m)
- Listed weight: 183 lb (83 kg)

Career information
- High school: Weston
- College: West Virginia (1915–1919)

Career history
- Akron Pros (1920–1921)

Awards and highlights
- NFL champion (1920); First-team All-American (1917); Second-team All-American (1919)

Career NFL statistics
- Games played: 23
- Games started: 21
- Stats at Pro Football Reference

Russell Brooks Bailey (October 17, 1897 – September 15, 1949) was an American professional football player who was a center for the Akron Pros of the APFA (later renamed National Football League in 1922). He played college football for the West Virginia Mountaineers. After his football career, he was a surgeon.

== Career ==
Bailey attended Weston High School in Weston, West Virginia. He attended West Virginia University, where he studied a pre-med curriculum. He played college football for the Mountaineers from 1915 to 1919. At West Virginia, he was a two-time All-American in 1917 and 1919 and served as a team captain in 1917. Following his career at West Virginia, he graduated from the University of Cincinnati College of Medicine and earned his doctorate.

He joined the Akron Pros in 1920 as the team's starting center,. The Pros would go undefeated and were awarded the Brunswick-Balke Collender Cup. He remained with the club through the 1921 season.

After football, Bailey worked as a surgeon in Wheeling, West Virginia, and served as chairman of the West Virginia Cancer Society, president of the West Virginia State Medical Association, chairman of the West Virginia Board of Health and director of the American Cancer Society. He died on September 15, 1949, after collapsing on a golf course in Wheeling.

Bailey was named to the West Virginia University Sports Hall of Fame in 1993.
