= Eugene Neely =

American football player (1896–1949)

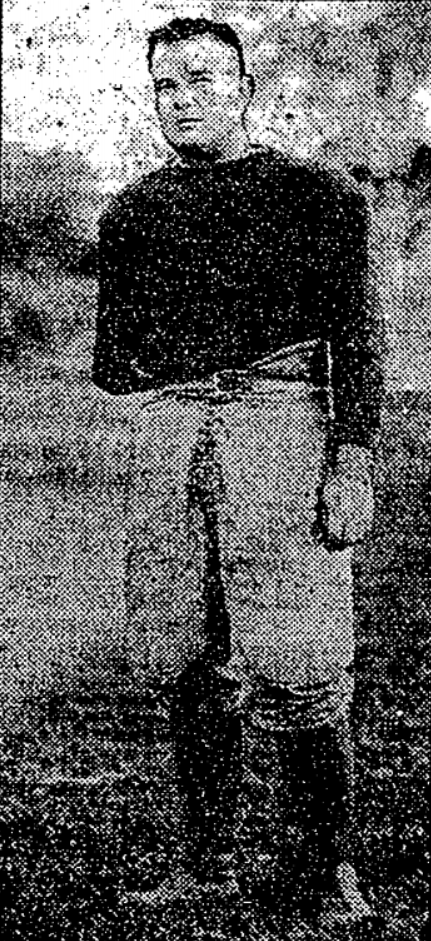
- Neely from The New York Times, October 1916

Profile
- Position: Guard

Personal information
- Born: February 9, 1896; Comanche, Texas, U.S.
- Died: December 2, 1949 (aged 53); Dallas, Texas, U.S.

Career information
- High school: Terrill Prep (TX)
- College: Dartmouth

Career history
- 1916–1917: Dartmouth

Awards and highlights
- Consensus All-American (1917)

Eugene Gentry "Guy" Neely (February 9, 1896 – December 2, 1949) was an American football player. Despite having only one arm, he played college football at the guard position for Dartmouth College and was a consensus first-team selection to the 1917 College Football All-America Team.

== Early life ==
Neely was born in 1896 in Comanche, Texas, and raised in Dallas, Texas. His parents were Richard V. Neely and Opelia Gentry. He lost his right arm in a hunting accident in approximately 1911. His arm was cut off above the elbow.

== Dartmouth ==
Neely enrolled in Dartmouth College in 1915. Neely played football for Dartmouth's freshman team in 1915. It was reported at the time that he was probably "the only one-armed football player in the country."

Neely then played for the Dartmouth Big Green football varsity team during the 1916 and 1917 football seasons. By October 1916, he had won a reputation as "the best man" in Dartmouth's line. He reportedly used the stub of his severed right arm "with telling effect in blocking and straight arming." Despite his handicap, he was also able to intercept and return a forward pass, later described by Life magazine as a "spectacular" play, during a game against West Virginia. After the 1917 season, he was selected as a consensus first-team guard on the 1917 College Football All-America Team.

== Later life ==
After leaving Dartmouth, Neely returned to Texas and coached football at the Terrill School (now known as St. Mark's School of Texas). He was married shortly after returning to Texas, and he and his wife Nell had two children, Stanley (born c. 1919) and Adele (born 1920). In 1920, he was living in Comanche, Texas, working as an oil dealer. In 1930, he was living in Dallas and working as a securities broker. In 1940, he was living in Dallas and working as a loan agent for life insurance. In 1942, he was employed by the Federal Housing Administration in Dallas.

Neely died in Dallas on December 2, 1949, at the age of 53.

== Head coaching record ==
Year	Team	Overall	Conference	Standing	Bowl/playoffs
Austin Kangaroos (Texas Intercollegiate Athletic Association) (1921)
1921	Austin	5–4			
Austin:		5–4			
Total:		5–4			
