= Ernie Hubka =

American football player, coach and politician (1897–1982)

Member of the Nebraska Legislature from the 30th district
- In office January 6, 1953 – January 1, 1957
- Preceded by: Joseph Shalla
- Succeeded by: Willard Henry Waldo

Personal details
- Born: August 13, 1897 Virginia, Nebraska, U.S.
- Died: April 26, 1982 (aged 84)
- Spouse: Thelma Underwood Hubka
- Children: Mary Hubka Mohrman, Sara Hubka Woodward
- Education: University of Nebraska–Lincoln
- Occupation: Politician, football player, coach
- Coaching career

Playing career
- 1917–1920: Nebraska
- Position: Fullback

Coaching career (HC unless noted)
- 1928: Omaha

Head coaching record
- Overall: 4–3–1

Accomplishments and honors

Awards
- Second-team All-American (1917)

Ernest A. Hubka (August 13, 1897 – April 26, 1982) was an American politician, lawyer, judge, and college football player and coach. He served as a member of the Nebraska Legislature.

== Life and career ==
Born in Virginia, Nebraska, Hubka graduated from the University of Nebraska–Lincoln in 1921. There he played college football from 1917 to 1920; notably serving as captain of the Nebraska Cornhuskers in 1918. After this he was a high school teacher in Yuma, Colorado, and York, Nebraska, from 1922 to 1926. He worked as a football coach for the high school in the York Public Schools district.

Hubka served as the head football coach at the University of Omaha—now known as the University of Nebraska–Omaha—in 1928, compiling a record of 4–3–1. He was at that a law student at the University of Nebraska College of Law, and graduated with his law degree in 1928.

After serving as a head football coach, Hubka began practicing law in Beatrice, Nebraska. From 1930 to 1938, he served as the county attorney of Gage County, Nebraska, and from 1946 to 1952 he served on the Beatrice Board of Education. In 1952, Hubka was elected to the Nebraska Legislature to represent District 30. He served two terms in the Nebraska Legislature from 1953 to 1957. He also worked as a district judge in Gage County.

Hubka died in Omaha, Nebraska on April 26, 1982 at the age of 84 in

== Head coaching record ==
Year	Team	Overall	Conference	Standing	Bowl/playoffs
Omaha Cardinals (Nebraska Intercollegiate Athletic Association) (1928)
1928	Omaha	4–3–1	2–1	2nd	
Omaha:		4–3–1	2–1		
Total:		4–3–1			
