= Conrad L. Eklund =

American football player and coach (1894–1953)

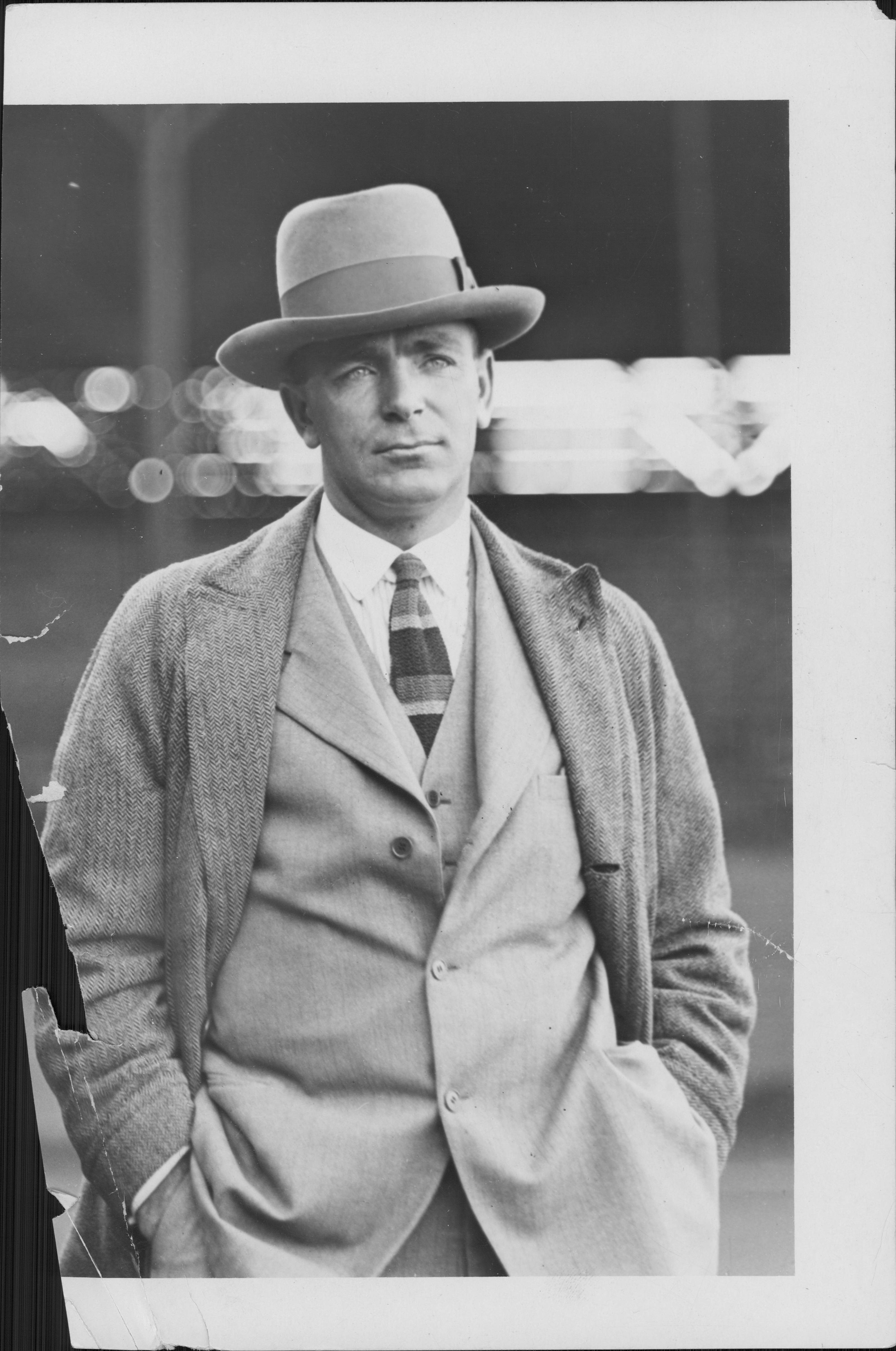

Biographical details
- Born: February 19, 1894
- Died: March 18, 1953 (aged 59); Key West, Florida, U.S.

Playing career

Football
- 1914: Macalester
- 1916–1917: Minnesota
- 1918: Great Lakes Navy

Basketball
- 1915–1917: Minnesota
- Positions: Guard, tackle (football)

Coaching career (HC unless noted)

Football
- 1926–1932: Augsburg

Head coaching record
- Overall: 15–22–5

Accomplishments and honors

Championships
- 1 MIAC (1928)

Awards
- All-Western (1916, 1917)

Conrad Lawrence Eklund (February 19, 1894 – March 18, 1953) was an American college football player and coach. He served as the head football coach at Augsburg Seminary—now known as Augsburg University—from 1926 to 1932, compiling a record of 15–22–5.

Eklund died on March 18, 1953, while vacationing in Key West, Florida.

== Head coaching record ==
Year	Team	Overall	Conference	Standing	Bowl/playoffs
Augsburg Auggies (Minnesota Intercollegiate Athletic Conference) (1926–1932)
1926	Augsburg	1–3–1	1–3–1	T–5th	
1927	Augsburg	4–2	3–2	T–2nd	
1928	Augsburg	4–1–2	3–1–2	T–1st	
1929	Augsburg	4–2–1	3–2–1	T–4th	
1930	Augsburg	1–4–1	0–4	T–7th	
1931	Augsburg	0–5	0–5	8th	
1932	Augsburg	1–5	0–5	8th	
Augsburg:		15–22–5	10–22–4		
Total:		15–22–5			
National championship Conference title Conference division title or championship game berth
