= Eber Simpson =

American athlete, coach, and physician (1895–1964)

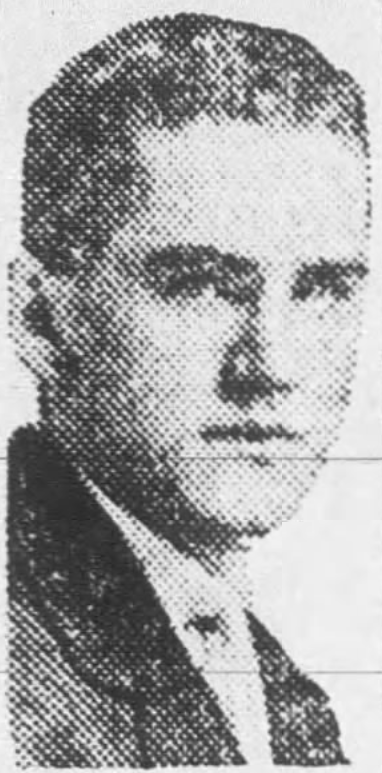

Biographical details
- Born: July 24, 1895; Oshkosh, Wisconsin, U.S.
- Died: December 19, 1964 (aged 69); Oshkosh, Wisconsin, U.S.

Playing career

Football
- 1915–1917: Wisconsin
- 1918: Washington University
- 1923: St. Louis All-Stars

Basketball
- 1917–1918: Wisconsin

Basketball
- ?–1918: Wisconsin
- Position: Quarterback (football)

Coaching career (HC unless noted)

Football
- 1919: Washington University (assistant)
- 1922–1925: East St. Louis HS (IL)

Eber Edward Simpson (July 24, 1895 – December 19, 1964) was an American football, basketball and baseball player, football coach, and physician. He attended the University of Wisconsin–Madison, where he starred in football, basketball, and baseball. He also played college football at Washington University in St. Louis, from which he earned a medical degree.

Simpson played football professionally in the National Football League (NFL) for the St. Louis All-Stars in 1923. He practiced medicine in St. Louis for 35 years before retiring in 1955.

== Biography ==
Simpson was born on July 24, 1895, in Oshkosh, Wisconsin. In 1919, he was appointed assistant football coach at Washington University in St. Louis under head football coach Dick Rutherford. He coached football at East St. Louis Senior High School in East St. Louis, Illinois, from 1922 to 1925.

Simpson died at his home in Oshkosh on December 19, 1964.
