= Illibuck =

American college football rivalry

Battle for the Illibuck
- Illinois Fighting Illini Ohio State Buckeyes
- First meeting: November 15, 1902; Tie, 0–0
- Latest meeting: September 26, 2026; Ohio State, 42–19
- Next meeting: 2028
- Trophy: Illibuck

Statistics
- Total meetings: 105
- All-time series: Ohio State leads, 70–30–4; 2010 vacated win not included
- Trophy series: Ohio State leads, 66–23–2; 2010 vacated win not included
- Largest victory: Ohio State, 48–0 (1996)
- Longest win streak: Ohio State, 15 (1968–1982)
- Current win streak: Ohio State, 10 (2008–present); 2010 vacated win not included

Illibuck is a trophy awarded to the winner of the college football rivalry between the Illinois Fighting Illini and the Ohio State Buckeyes football teams.

== History ==
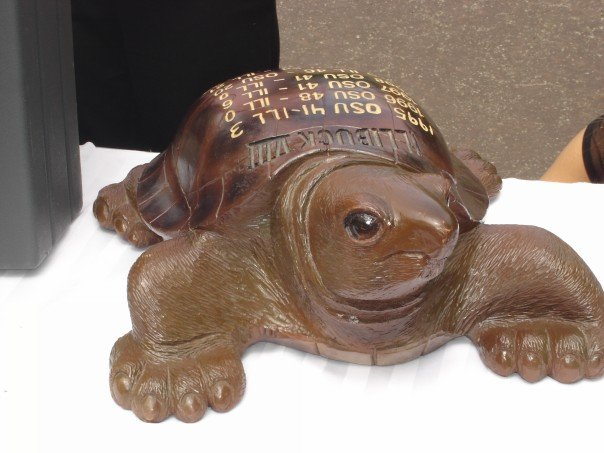
The winning team in the Illinois–Ohio State game receives this wooden turtle, named the Illibuck.

Locations of Illinois and Ohio State

The Illibuck is a carved wooden turtle that serves as the trophy awarded to the winner of the game. Two junior honorary societies, Bucket and Dipper of Ohio State and Atius-Sachem of Illinois, are responsible for the care of the Illibuck. Originally the "trophy" was a live turtle when the tradition began in 1925, picked for its expected long life as a symbol of the anticipated long life of the rivalry. From 1919 to 1933, the Illinois–Ohio State game was the regular-season finale for both teams. Since the original turtle's death on April 14, 1926, ten wooden replica Illibucks have been carved, each with the scores from games on its back. The Illibuck is the second oldest trophy passed between Big Ten Conference football programs (the Little Brown Jug was created in 1903).

The rivalry once included the smoking of a "peace pipe" between members of the two junior honorary societies, which occurred at halftime of the game. This practice has not been done for many years. However, the trophy is still presented to the winning school of the previous year's contest between quarters.

The series was temporarily interrupted during the 2003 and 2004 seasons when Ohio State and Illinois did not play each other. When the teams met in 2005, Illinois presented the trophy to Ohio State for winning the 2002 game. Ohio State leads the overall series 70–30–4 and the trophy series 66–23–2.

In 2011, the Big Ten expanded to 12 teams and split into two divisions. Ohio State and Illinois were both placed in the Leaders Division, meaning they would play each other every year. But in 2014, the league expanded to accommodate the addition of Maryland and Rutgers, which placed Illinois in the West Division and Ohio State in the East Division. Therefore, the two schools no longer met annually.

The teams went seven seasons without a match-up, from 2018 through 2024. The game scheduled for November 28, 2020, was cancelled by Ohio State due to a high number of COVID-19 cases among the program.

With the 2024 expansion of the Big Ten and removal of divisions, Ohio State and Illinois will now meet at least twice in each five-year cycle.

== Game results ==
Illinois victories	Ohio State victories	Tie games	Vacated wins

No.	Date	Location	Winner	Score
1	November 15, 1902	Columbus	Tie	0–0
2	November 5, 1904	Columbus	Illinois	46–0
3	October 17, 1914	Champaign	Illinois	37–0
4	October 16, 1915	Columbus	Tie	3–3
5	October 21, 1916	Champaign	Ohio State	7–6
6	November 17, 1917	Columbus	Ohio State	13–0
7	November 16, 1918	Champaign	Illinois	13–0
8	November 22, 1919	Columbus	Illinois	9–7
9	November 20, 1920	Champaign	Ohio State	7–0
10	November 19, 1921	Columbus	Illinois	7–0
11	November 25, 1922	Champaign	Ohio State	6–3
12	November 24, 1923	Columbus	Illinois	9–0
13	November 22, 1924	Champaign	Illinois	7–0
14	November 21, 1925	Columbus	Illinois	14–9
15	November 20, 1926	Champaign	Ohio State	7–6
16	November 19, 1927	Columbus	Illinois	13–0
17	November 24, 1928	Champaign	Illinois	8–0
18	November 23, 1929	Columbus	Illinois	27–0
19	November 22, 1930	Champaign	Ohio State	12–9
20	November 21, 1931	Columbus	Ohio State	40–0
21	November 19, 1932	Champaign	Ohio State	3–0
22	November 25, 1933	Columbus	Ohio State	7–6
23	October 13, 1934	Champaign	Illinois	14–13
24	November 16, 1935	Columbus	Ohio State	6–0
25	November 14, 1936	Champaign	Ohio State	13–0
26	November 13, 1937	Columbus	Ohio State	19–0
27	November 12, 1938	Champaign	Ohio State	32–14
28	November 18, 1939	Columbus	#8 Ohio State	21–0
29	November 16, 1940	Urbana, Illinois	Ohio State	14–6
30	November 15, 1941	Columbus	#20 Ohio State	12–7
31	November 14, 1942	Cleveland, Ohio	#10 Ohio State	44–20
32	November 13, 1943	Columbus	Ohio State	29–26
33	November 18, 1944	Cleveland, Ohio	#4 Ohio State	26–12
34	November 17, 1945	Columbus	#9 Ohio State	27–2
35	November 16, 1946	Champaign	#9 Illinois	16–7
36	November 15, 1947	Columbus	Illinois	28–7
37	November 13, 1948	Champaign	Ohio State	34–7
38	November 12, 1949	Columbus	#11 Ohio State	30–17
39	November 18, 1950	Champaign	#8 Illinois	14–7
40	November 17, 1951	Columbus	Tie	0–0
41	November 15, 1952	Champaign	Ohio State	27–7
42	October 10, 1953	Columbus	Illinois	41–20
43	October 9, 1954	Champaign	#10 Ohio State	40–7
44	October 8, 1955	Columbus	Ohio State	27–12
45	October 13, 1956	Champaign	#5 Ohio State	26–6
46	October 12, 1957	Columbus	Ohio State	21–7
47	October 11, 1958	Champaign	#5 Ohio State	19–13
48	October 10, 1959	Columbus	#20 Illinois	9–0
49	October 8, 1960	Champaign	#5 Ohio State	34–7
50	October 14, 1961	Columbus	#7 Ohio State	44–0
51	October 13, 1962	Champaign	#10 Ohio State	51–15
52	October 12, 1963	Columbus	Tie	20–20
53	October 10, 1964	Champaign	#4 Ohio State	26–0
54	October 9, 1965	Columbus	Ohio State	28–14

No.	Date	Location	Winner	Score
55	October 8, 1966	Champaign	Illinois	10–9
56	October 28, 1967	Columbus	Illinois	17–13
57	October 26, 1968	Champaign	#2 Ohio State	31–24
58	October 25, 1969	Columbus	#1 Ohio State	41–0
59	October 24, 1970	Champaign	#1 Ohio State	48–29
60	October 9, 1971	Champaign	#15 Ohio State	24–10
61	October 14, 1972	Columbus	#4 Ohio State	26–7
62	November 3, 1973	Champaign	#1 Ohio State	30–0
63	November 2, 1974	Columbus	#1 Ohio State	49–7
64	November 8, 1975	Champaign	#1 Ohio State	40–3
65	November 6, 1976	Columbus	#8 Ohio State	42–10
66	November 5, 1977	Champaign	#4 Ohio State	35–0
67	November 11, 1978	Columbus	Ohio State	45–7
68	November 3, 1979	Champaign	#5 Ohio State	44–7
69	November 8, 1980	Columbus	#7 Ohio State	49–42
70	October 17, 1981	Columbus	Ohio State	34–27
71	October 16, 1982	Champaign	Ohio State	26–21
72	October 15, 1983	Champaign	#19 Illinois	17–13
73	October 13, 1984	Columbus	#8 Ohio State	45–38
74	October 5, 1985	Champaign	Illinois	31–28
75	October 4, 1986	Columbus	Ohio State	14–0
76	October 3, 1987	Champaign	#9 Ohio State	10–6
77	October 1, 1988	Columbus	Illinois	31–12
78	October 7, 1989	Champaign	#18 Illinois	34–14
79	October 6, 1990	Columbus	#13 Illinois	31–20
80	October 12, 1991	Champaign	#20 Illinois	10–7
81	October 10, 1992	Columbus	Illinois	18–16
82	October 9, 1993	Champaign	#6 Ohio State	20–12
83	October 8, 1994	Columbus	Illinois	24–10
84	November 11, 1995	Columbus	#2 Ohio State	41–3
85	November 9, 1996	Champaign	#2 Ohio State	48–0
86	November 15, 1997	Columbus	#4 Ohio State	41–6
87	October 10, 1998	Champaign	#1 Ohio State	41–0
88	November 13, 1999	Columbus	Illinois	46–20
89	November 11, 2000	Champaign	#13 Ohio State	24–21
90	November 17, 2001	Columbus	#12 Illinois	34–22
91	November 16, 2002	Champaign	#2 Ohio State	23–16
92	November 5, 2005	Columbus	#12 Ohio State	40–2
93	November 4, 2006	Champaign	#1 Ohio State	17–10
94	November 10, 2007	Columbus	Illinois	28–21
95	November 15, 2008	Champaign	#10 Ohio State	30–20
96	September 26, 2009	Columbus	#13 Ohio State	30–0
97	October 2, 2010	Champaign	#2 Ohio State^{†}	24–13
98	October 15, 2011	Champaign	Ohio State	17–7
99	November 3, 2012	Columbus	#6 Ohio State	52–22
100	November 16, 2013	Champaign	#3 Ohio State	60–35
101	November 1, 2014	Columbus	#13 Ohio State	55–14
102	November 14, 2015	Champaign	#2 Ohio State	28–3
103	November 18, 2017	Columbus	#9 Ohio State	52–14
104	October 11, 2025	Champaign	#1 Ohio State	34–16
105	September 26, 2026	Columbus	#7 Ohio State	42–19
Series: Ohio State leads 70–30–4
† Ohio State's victory vacated due to use of ineligible players

== See also ==
- List of NCAA college football rivalry games
- List of most-played college football series in NCAA Division I
