= Ohio Field =

Stadium in Columbus, Ohio

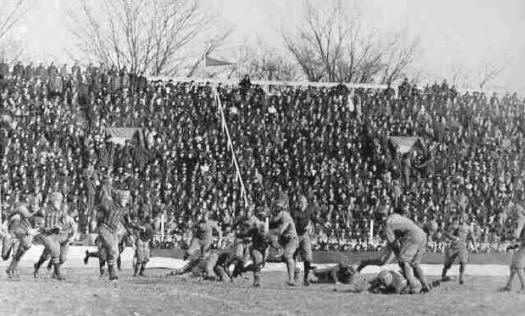
- Ohio State vs. Northwestern at Ohio Field, 1916
- Interactive map of Ohio Field
- Former names: University Park (1898–1908)
- Location: Columbus, Ohio
- Coordinates: 40°00′10″N 83°00′34″W
- Capacity: 500 (1898–1907); 10,000 (1907–14); 14,000 (1914–21)
- Type: Open

Construction
- Built: 1898
- Opened: 1898
- Expanded: 1914
- Closed: 1921
- Demolished: 1922

Tenants
- Ohio State Buckeyes; Football (1898–1921); Men's track and field (1898–1921)

Ohio Field was a multipurpose stadium on the campus of Ohio State University in Columbus, Ohio, United States. It was built in 1898, dedicated in 1908, and served as the first on-campus home of the Ohio State Buckeyes football team as well as the track and field team through the 1921 season. Initial seating capacity was approximately 500 until 1907, when a grandstand and bleachers were added. Another renovation in 1910 saw a second grandstand added, with amenities such as brick ticket booths and iron fences, boosting capacity to 14,000.

While playing at Ohio Field, the Buckeyes joined the Big Ten Conference, then known as the Western Conference, in 1912. The football team rose to prominence after the arrival of Chic Harley in 1916, who led the team to their first conference championships in 1916 and 1917. The team's success and the popularity of Harley led to a significant increase in the demand for tickets. In 1919, 20,000 fans attended the game against Illinois, with an estimated 40,000 watching from the stadium's perimeter, including from the roofs of neighboring homes. The increased popularity of Ohio State football necessitated construction of a larger stadium. Land was purchased by the university in 1919 along the Olentangy River and a fundraising drive was started. Ohio Stadium opened in 1922, with an initial seating capacity of approximately 63,000.

After the opening of Ohio Stadium, Ohio Field was torn down. It was located on North High Street, between 17th and Woodruff Avenues. Presently, the space is occupied by Arps Hall, Ramseyer Hall and a parking garage.

In the Ohio State University Marching Band's Buckeye Battle Cry song, the lyrics "Ohio Field will once again hear the Buckeye Battle Cry" play. The song generally played following an Ohio State football touchdown or an Ohio State football win and before each home game when the band marches down the field following its traditional "ramp entrance."
