= Bob Koehler =

American football player (1894–1949)

No. 3, 18, 19, 5, 14
- Position: Fullback

Personal information
- Born: April 7, 1894; Chicago, U.S.
- Died: July 1, 1949 (aged 55); Sister Lakes, Michigan, U.S.

Career information
- College: Northwestern

Career history
- Decatur Staleys (1919-1920); Chicago Cardinals (1921–1926)

Awards and highlights
- All-American (1917); First-team All-Big Ten (1917)

Career statistics
- Games played: 71
- Games started: 58
- Touchdowns: 9
- Stats at Pro Football Reference

Robert Adam Charles Koehler (April 7, 1894 – July 1, 1949) was an American professional football player who played fullback for seven seasons for the Decatur Staleys and the Chicago Cardinals of the National Football League (NFL).
