= Charles Bolen =

American sports player, coach, and college athletics administrator

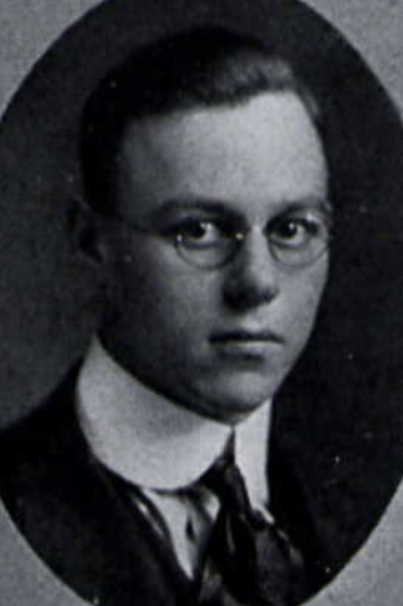
- Bolen pictured in the 1917 Makio

Biographical details
- Born: January 8, 1894; Marion, Indiana, U.S.
- Died: December 28, 1953 (aged 59); Columbus, Ohio, U.S.

Playing career

Football
- 1915–1917: Ohio State

Basketball
- 1915–1918: Ohio State
- Position: End (football)

Coaching career (HC unless noted)

Football
- 1919–1921: Ohio Northern
- 1923–1929: Wilmington (OH)

Basketball
- 1919–1922: Ohio Northern
- 1923–1929: Wilmington (OH)

Baseball
- 1919–1920: Ohio Northern

Head coaching record
- Overall: 37–40–1 (football); 132–65 (basketball); 7–1 (baseball)

Accomplishments and honors

Awards
- Consensus All-American (1917); 2× All-Big Ten (1916, 1917)

Charles Wesley "Shifty" 'Bolen (January 8, 1894 – December 28, 1953) was an American football and basketball player, coach, and college athletics administrator.

While attending Ohio State University, Bolen played three years for both the Ohio State Buckeyes football and Buckeyes basketball teams. In football, he developed a reputation as a "fierce, tigerish" player and "the premier defensive end in the West", and he was selected as a consensus first-team end on the 1917 College Football All-America Team. In basketball, he was captain of Ohio State's 1917–18 team.

Bolen served as the head football at Ohio Northern University from 1919 to 1921 and at Wilmington College in Wilmington, Ohio from 1923 to 1929, compiling a career college football coaching record of 37–40–1. He was also the head coach of the men's basketball team at Ohio Northern from 1919 to 1922, tallying a mark of 37–19. He served for many years as an administrator in the Ohio Northern athletic department and was the founder of the university's intramural sports program.

Bolen died in 1953 and was buried at the Green Lawn Cemetery in Columbus, Ohio.

== Head coaching record ==
=== Football ===
Year	Team	Overall	Conference	Standing	Bowl/playoffs
Ohio Northern (Ohio Athletic Conference) (1919–1921)
1919	Ohio Northern	1–8	0–6	15th	
1920	Ohio Northern	3–4	2–3	11th	
1921	Ohio Northern	5–4	4–3	T–7th	
Ohio Northern:		9–16	6–12		
Wilmington Quakers (Independent) (1923–1929)
1923	Wilmington	2–6			
1924	Wilmington	4–3			
1925	Wilmington	6–2			
1926	Wilmington	3–4			
1927	Wilmington	3–4			
1928	Wilmington	6–3			
1929	Wilmington	4–2–1			
Wilmington:		28–24–1			
Total:		37–40–1			
