= George Hauser =

American football player and coach (1893–1968)

George W. Hauser
Biographical details
- Born: February 24, 1893; Council Bluffs, Iowa, U.S.
- Died: November 8, 1968 (aged 75); Seattle, Washington, U.S.

Playing career
- 1915–1917: Minnesota
- Position: Tackle

Coaching career (HC unless noted)
- 1919–1923: Minnesota (assistant)
- 1924–1925: Iowa State (line)
- 1926–1927: Colgate
- 1929–1931: Ohio State (line)
- 1932–1941: Minnesota (assistant)
- 1942–1944: Minnesota
- 1945–1950: Minnesota (assistant)

Head coaching record
- Overall: 24–15–6

Accomplishments and honors

Awards
- Consensus All-American (1917); First-team All-American (1916); 2× First-team All-Big Ten (1916, 1917)

George Wesley Hauser (February 24, 1893 – November 8, 1968) was an American college football player and coach. He served as the head football coach at Colgate University from 1926 until 1927 and at the University of Minnesota from 1942 to 1944, compiling a career coaching record of 24–15–6. His record at Colgate was 9–4–5. His overall record at Minnesota was 15–11–1 (.574) and his conference record was 8–8–1. Hauser played football at Minnesota as a tackle from 1915 to 1917. He died on November 8, 1968, in Seattle, Washington, following a long illness.

== Head coaching record ==
Year	Team	Overall	Conference	Standing	AP^{#}
Colgate (Independent) (1926–1927)
1926	Colgate	5–2–2			
1927	Colgate	4–2–3			
Colgate:		9–4–5			
Minnesota Golden Gophers (Big Ten Conference) (1942–1944)
1942	Minnesota	5–4	3–3	T–5th	19
1943	Minnesota	5–4	2–3	5th	
1944	Minnesota	5–3–1	3–2–1	4th	
Minnesota:		15–11–1	8–8–1		
Total:		24–15–6			
^{#}Rankings from final AP Poll.
