= Northrop Field =

Minnesota football stadium

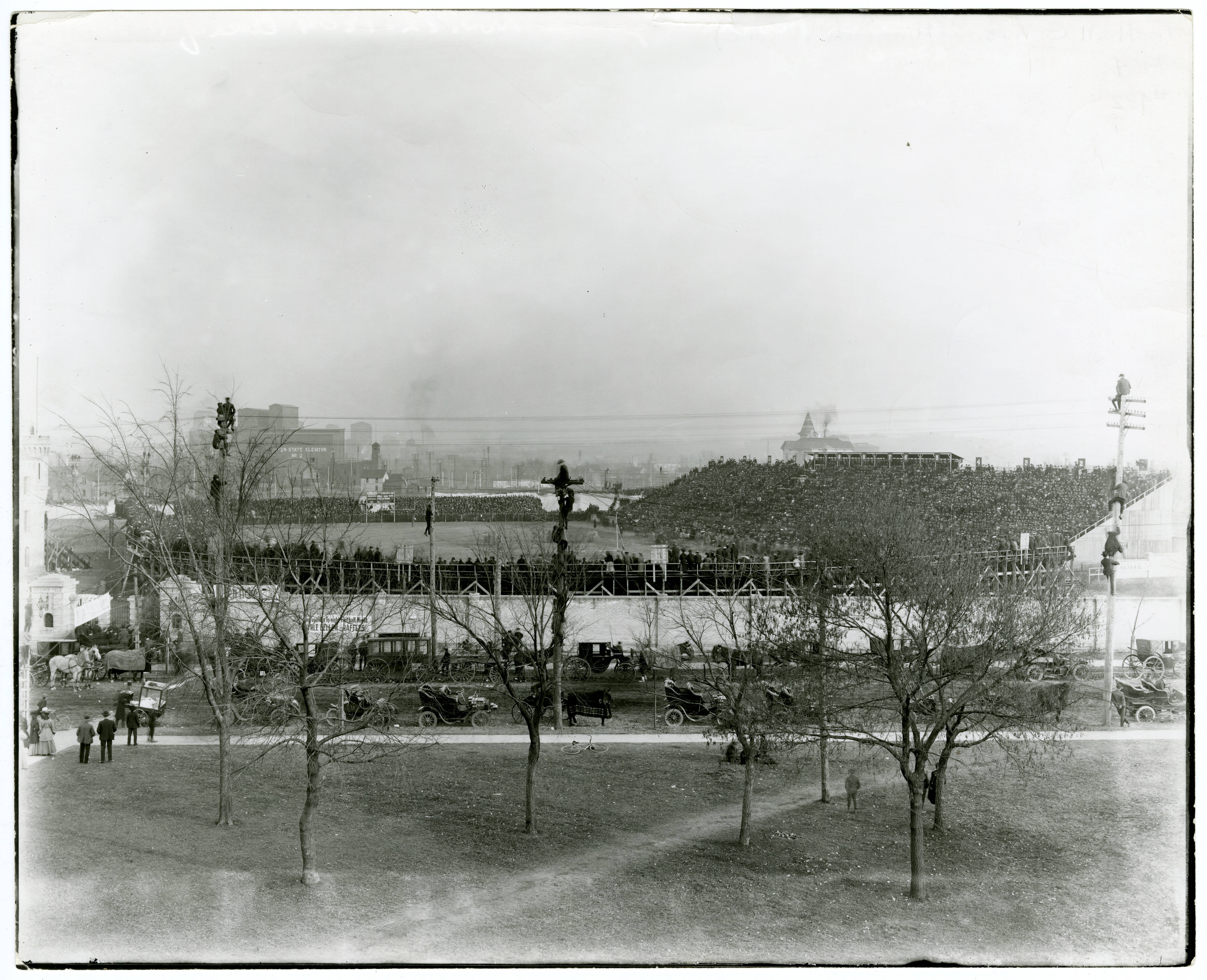
- Interactive map of Northrop Field
- Former names: Greater Northrop Field
- Location: Minneapolis, Minnesota
- Coordinates: 44°58′35″N 93°13′56″W
- Owner: University of Minnesota
- Surface: Grass

Construction
- Groundbreaking: 1899
- Closed: 1923

Tenant
- Minnesota Golden Gophers (NCAA) (1899–1923)

Northrop Field was the on-campus stadium of the Minnesota Golden Gophers football team from 1899 to 1923. The original field had seating of around 3,000 and was named for University President Cyrus Northrop. After the 1902 season, the playing field was moved and new seating was added that allowed for crowds of up to 20,000. The stadium was sometimes referred to as Greater Northrop Field after 1902. In 1903, the first season at the enlarged field, the Gophers played the Michigan Wolverines in the first Little Brown Jug game. The stadium continued on as the football team's home until the end of the 1923 season. The University of Minnesota then built Memorial Stadium and moved there in 1924.

The football team played at various fields on campus and around Minneapolis, including the field next to the University of Minnesota Armory and the downtown Athletic Park next to the West Hotel, from 1882 to 1898.
