= Chic Harley =

American football player (1895–1974)

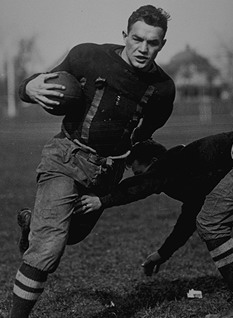
- Harley playing for the Buckeyes

No. 4
- Positions: Halfback, wingback

Personal information
- Born: September 15, 1895; Chicago, Illinois, U.S.
- Died: April 21, 1974 (aged 78); Danville, Illinois, U.S.
- Listed height: 5 ft 8 in (1.73 m)
- Listed weight: 165 lb (75 kg)

Career information
- High school: East (Columbus, Ohio)
- College: Ohio State (1916–1917, 1919)

Career history
- Chicago Staleys (1921)

Awards and highlights
- 3× Consensus All-American (1916, 1917, 1919); 3× First-team All-Big Ten (1916, (Note: Then known as All-Western Conference) 1917, 1919); Ohio State Buckeyes No. 47 retired

Career statistics
- Games played: 9
- Games started: 5
- Stats at Pro Football Reference
- College Football Hall of Fame

Charles Wesley "Chic" Harley (September 15, 1895 – April 21, 1974) was an American football player and athlete, often credited with bringing Ohio State University's football program to national attention. Harley was Ohio State's first consensus first-team All-American selection and first three-time All-America selection. In 1951, he became a charter inductee in the College Football Hall of Fame.

In 1941, James Thurber described Harley's running skills for the New York City newspaper, PM, "If you never saw him run with a football, I can't describe it to you. It wasn't like Red Grange or Tom Harmon or anybody else. It was kind of a cross between music and cannon fire, and it brought your heart up under your ears."

== Early life ==
Harley was born in Chicago, Illinois, hence the source of the nickname Chic, but his family moved to Columbus, Ohio, when he was 12 years old. There Harley attended East High School. The family was to return to Chicago just before Harley's senior year, but the Columbus East principal convinced the family to let Harley stay for his final year. In his career at East High School, Harley's team lost only one game, his last.

== College career ==
Harley was recruited to attend Ohio State by the university's chapter of the Phi Gamma Delta fraternity, the fraternity he joined upon his arrival on campus. Harley began his career with the Ohio State Buckeyes in 1916. He led the team to a 7–0 record and their first Big Ten Conference championship. The team scored 258 points in seven games and giving up only 29. The key games of the season were a 7–6 victory over the University of Illinois and a 14–13 victory over the University of Wisconsin–Madison, teams that were at the time the conference's dominant powers. In both games, the margin of victory was a point after touchdown kicked by Harley. Following the season, Harley was named as a consensus first-team All-America selection, including a spot on Walter Camp's authoritative list.

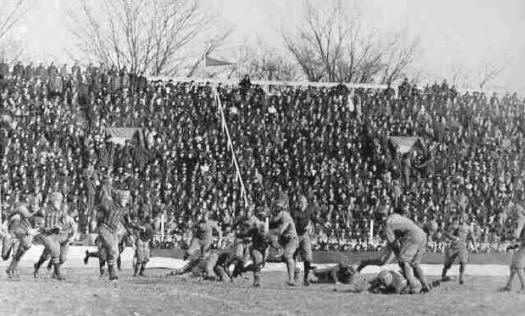
Chic Harley runs around the end in the 1916 Big Ten championship game against Northwestern

The Buckeyes repeated as conference champion in 1917 with an 8–0–1 record, and Harley repeated as a consensus first-team All-American. In 1918, Harley left school to be a pilot in the United States Army Air Service during World War I, but he returned the following year. In 1919, the Buckeyes finished 6–1. In Harley's only career loss, the team lost the conference title to the University of Illinois on a field goal with eight seconds left in the season finale.

The 1919 season is most remembered at Ohio State, however, for recording the school's first victory over arch-rival University of Michigan. Following the Buckeyes' 13–3 win, legendary Michigan head coach Fielding H. Yost asked for and was granted a rare moment to address the Ohio State team. "You deserve your victory, you fought brilliantly," Yost began. "You boys gave a grand exhibition of football strategy and while I am sorry, dreadfully sorry, that we lost, I want to congratulate you. And you, Mr. Harley, I believe, are one of the finest little machines I have ever seen."

Coach Yost was not alone in his praise. Harley was again a consensus first-team All-American in 1919 and became the first three-time All-America selection at Ohio State. The Buckeyes now have eight three-time All-Americans in their 120-plus years of college football, but none more impactful than their first.

Throughout his Ohio State career, Harley played right halfback on offense and safety on defense, and was also the team's punter and place kicker. He scored 201 points in a 23-game career. This total was the school's individual scoring record until Harley was surpassed by Howard "Hopalong" Cassady in 1955. Harley's 8.74 points per game remains a school record. Harley also holds the team record for interceptions in a game: he picked off four passes in the 1919 game against the University of Michigan.

In 1950, Harley was voted a first-team halfback on the Associated Press college football All-Star team for the first half of the 20th century. The other first-team halfback was Jim Thorpe. Red Grange was voted to the second team. When asked to explain his vote, one writer said, "Red Grange was a great runner, but that's all he was. Chic Harley was a great runner, a great passer, a great kicker and a great defensive back. That's why he's on my first-team." In 1951 Harley was one of 44 players and coaches selected as the charter members of the College Football Hall of Fame.

In Harley's era, the Buckeyes played in Ohio Field, which had a seating capacity of no more than 20,000. Harley so excited the fans of Ohio State football that he inspired a $1.3 million funding drive, starting in 1920, to build the massive Ohio Stadium. For this reason Ohio Stadium, where the Buckeyes still play, is sometimes called "The House That Harley Built".

=== College football scoring statistics ===
Year	TDs	PATs	FGs	Points
1916 (7 games)	8	7	1	58
1917 (9 games)	8	15	3	72
1919 (8 games)	7	17	4	71
Total (24 games)	23	39	8	201

=== All-around athlete ===
In addition to his football exploits, Harley also lettered in baseball, basketball, and track. He was an outfielder in baseball, a guard in basketball, a sprinter in track, and one of the first lifeguards for the Olentangy Park swimming pool. Harley was a member of the 1917 Big Ten baseball championship team. On the track field, Harley set a conference record in the 50-yard dash.

== Professional career and illness ==
Harley was paired on the Decatur Staleys with Pete Stinchcomb, a former Ohio State teammate.

Following his college playing career, Harley was contacted by George Halas to play for the NFL team Halas was organizing, a team that would ultimately become the Chicago Bears. Harley's brother, sportswriter Bill Harley — believed by gridiron historian John Carroll to have been the first agent in American professional football history — negotiated a contract that was to give Chic Harley one-third ownership of the team. However, that contract was voided when a physical revealed health impairments resultant from Harley's time in the war. At the time he was diagnosed with Dementia praecox, a chronic, deteriorating psychotic disorder characterized by rapid cognitive disintegration, usually beginning in the late teens or early adulthood."

Harley ultimately became hospitalized at the Veteran's Administration Hospital in Danville, Illinois, where he was a patient for the remainder of his life.

== Later life and death ==
Harley returned to Columbus in 1949 for a tribute at Ohio Stadium. The Ohio State University Marching Band adapted their famous "Script Ohio" formation to spell out the name "Chic." By 2009 that performance remained the only time that the formation has been altered. Harley died of pneumonia in 1974 at the age of 78. His pallbearers were the five Ohio State football captains at the time; Archie Griffin, Arnie Jones, Steve Myers, Neal Colzie, Pete Cuzick and tackle Kurt Schumacher. Chic's final resting place is located at Union Cemetery along the Olentangy River, about two miles north of the Ohio State University campus.

Chic's great-great nephew, Rob Harley, also played at Ohio State and was a member of the 2002 National Championship team. Rob is currently the head coach at Northern Illinois University.

== Honors ==
Harley was among the first induction class of the Ohio State Varsity O Hall of Fame in 1977.

Ohio State began honoring players by retiring their numbers in 1999. Jersey numbers were more fluid in Harley's era, changing from game to game, but the university decided to honor Harley by retiring the final number he wore for Ohio State, #47. The ceremony was held at halftime of a game with Penn State on October 30, 2004. Ironically, that number was worn by Harley in the only collegiate game he lost. Many believe it would have been more appropriate to retire #10, which was the number Harley wore while defeating Michigan.

To this day, East High School still plays on the same field that Harley played on in the 1910s, which has been named Harley Field in his honor.

The Chic Harley Award is presented by the Touchdown Club of Columbus to the College Football Player of the Year.
