= Nosbusch =

Nosbusch is a German surname. There are variant spellings including "Nosbush" and "Nosbisch". Notable people with the surname include:

- Desiree Nosbusch (born 1965), Luxembourgian television presenter and actress
- Keith Nosbusch, CEO Rockwell Automation
