= Big Ten Medal of Honor =

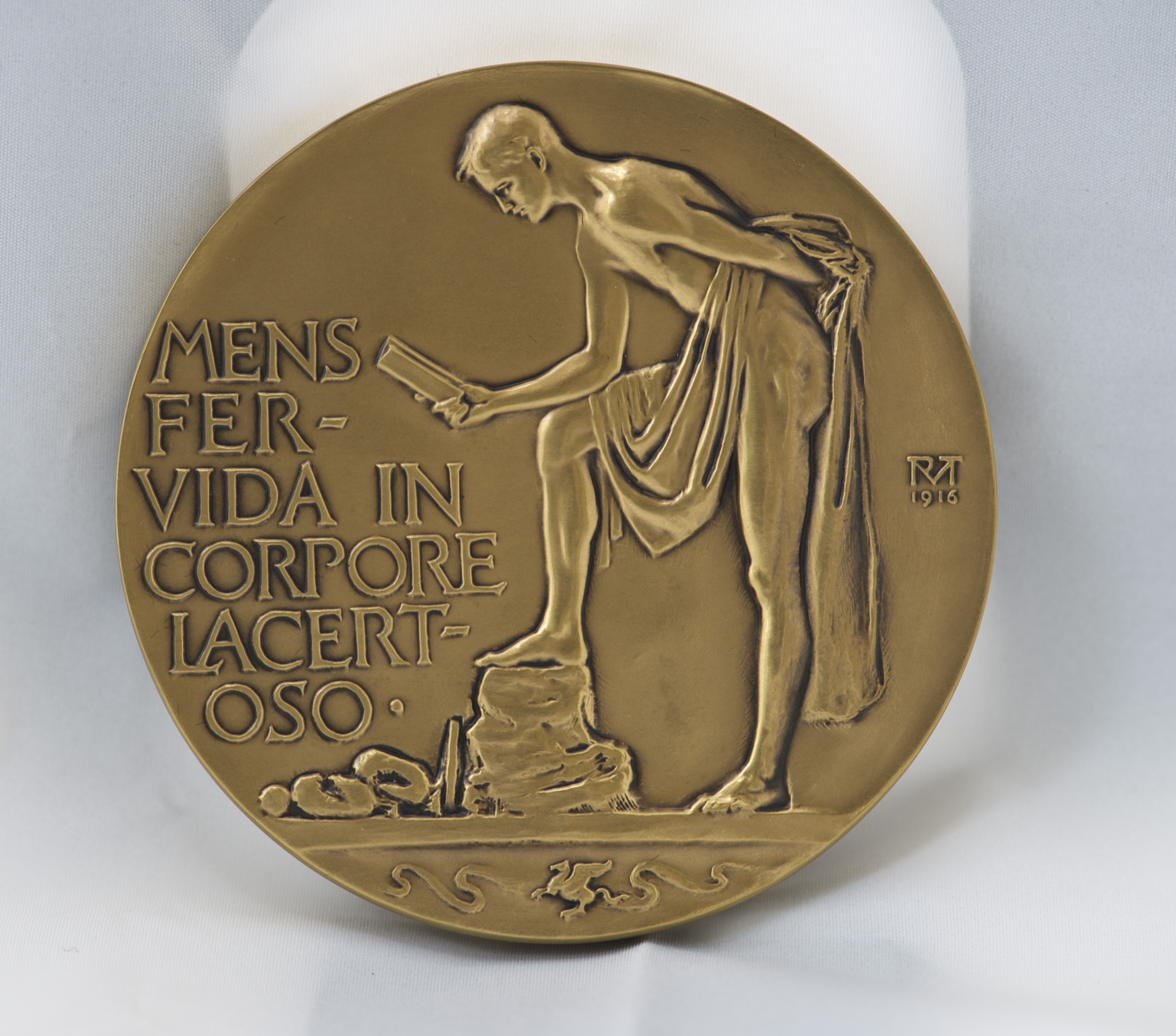
- Awarded for: Greatest Proficiency in Athletics and Scholastic Work
- Country: United States
- Presented by: Big Ten Conference
- First award: 1915
- Currently held by: 36 each year (since 2024–25)
- Website: www.bigten.org

One of the most prestigious conference awards in college athletics, the Big Ten Medal of Honor was first awarded in 1915 to one student-athlete from the graduating class of each university who had "attained the greatest proficiency in athletics and scholastic work". The 18 institutions of the Big Ten feature over 10,000 student-athletes, more than any other conference, and only 28 of those individuals are recognized each year with the Big Ten Medal of Honor. In the nearly 100 years of the Medal of Honor, just over 1,300 student-athletes have earned this distinction. The medal features the Latin phrase Mens fervida in corpore lacertoso ("a fervent mind in a vigorous body") on one side and the student's name and the phrase For Scholarship and Athletic Prowess on the reverse side.

== History ==
The award was first given in 1915. It was the first award in intercollegiate athletics to demonstrate support of the educational emphasis placed on athletics and honor those who embody the values of the "student athlete". Although originally awarded only to male athletes, since 1982, a female athlete from each institution has also been recognized.

== Notable recipients ==
The Big Ten Medal of Honor has been awarded to numerous decorated athletes who achieved success after college both in athletics and beyond, including:

- NCAA 10-time National Champion Coach John R. Wooden (Purdue)
- NFL quarterbacks and Super Bowl-winners Bob Griese and Drew Brees (Purdue)
- Seven-time NBA All-Star and member of the Basketball Hall of Fame Jerry Lucas (Ohio State)
- NFL safety and the first African-American coach to win a Super Bowl Tony Dungy (Minnesota)
- MLB catcher and three-time World Series champion Joe Girardi (Northwestern)
- College Football Hall of Fame member and football coach Pat Fitzgerald (Northwestern)
- Olympic swimmer and gold medalist Davis Tarwater (Michigan)
- Former baseball player turned sports agent Casey Close (Michigan)
- Pan American Games Gold medalist gymnast Abie Grossfeld (Illinois)
- Collegiate track and field coach Francis X. Cretzmeyer (Iowa)
- Professional soccer players Joanna Lohman (Penn State), Emily Zurrer (Illinois), Vanessa DiBernardo (Illinois), and Britt Eckerstrom (Penn State)
- Nine-time letterman and University of Wisconsin–Madison athletic director credited with rescuing Badger athletics Pat Richter (Wisconsin)
- Businessman Keith Nosbusch, chairman and CEO of Rockwell Automation Inc. (Wisconsin)
- NASA astronaut Michael S. Hopkins (Illinois)
- Attourney and acting United States Attorney General Matthew Whitaker

== List of winners ==
Winners by year
School	Year	Men's name	Men's sport	Women's name	Women's sport
Chicago	1915	Francis T. Ward	Track & Field		
Illinois	1915	Allan Williford	Basketball		
Indiana	1915	Matthew Winters	Baseball		
Iowa	1915	Herman VonLackum	Football		
Minnesota	1915	Boles A. Rosenthal	Football/Track & Field		
Northwestern	1915	Harold G. Osborn	Track & Field		
Ohio State	1915	Arthur S. Kiefer	Football		
Purdue	1915	Harry B. Routh	Football		
Wisconsin	1915	Martin Thomas Kennedy	Rowing		
Chicago	1916	Paul S. Russell	Football		
Illinois	1916	Elmo Paul Hohman	Track & Field		
Indiana	1916	George J. Shively	Baseball		
Iowa	1916	Forrest W. Deardorff	Baseball		
Minnesota	1916	Bernie Bierman	Football/Basketball/Track & Field		
Northwestern	1916	John Harvey Ellis	Basketball		
Ohio State	1916	Charles A. Carran	Tennis		
Purdue	1916	Paul L. Walter	Football/Basketball/Baseball		
Wisconsin	1916	William Dow Harvey	Track & Field		
Chicago	1917	Daniel J. Fisher	Track & Field		
Illinois	1917	Clyde Alwood	Basketball		
Indiana	1917	DeWitt T. Mullett	Basketball		
Iowa	1917	Wayne J. Foster	Baseball		
Minnesota	1917	Joseph M. Sprafka	Football/Track & Field		
Northwestern	1917	Edgar Paul Williams	Football		
Ohio State	1917	Allen R. Rankin	Track & Field		
Purdue	1917	Melvin John Proud	Football		
Wisconsin	1917	Mead Burke	Track & Field		
Chicago	1918	Walter C. Earle	Swimming & Diving		
Illinois	1918	John Leo Klein	Football/Baseball		
Indiana	1918	Wilbur J. Dalzell	Football/Wrestling		
Iowa	1918	John VonLackum	Football		
Minnesota	1918	George Hauser	Football/Track & Field		
Northwestern	1918	No Award			
Ohio State	1918	Howard Yerges Sr.	Football		
Purdue	1918	Herbert L. Hart	Football		
Wisconsin	1918	Ebert Edward Simpson Jr.	Basketball		
Michigan	1918	Alan W. Boyd	Football		
Chicago	1919	William C. Gorgas	Basketball		
Illinois	1919	G. C. Gucheit	Football		
Indiana	1919	William M. Zeller	Basketball		
Iowa	1919	Homer W. Scott	Football		
Minnesota	1919	Erling Platou	Basketball/Track & Field		
Northwestern	1919	Ruben Allen Marquardt	Basketball		
Ohio State	1919	Sheldon J. Mann	Baseball		
Purdue	1919	Robert E. Markley	Football/Basketball.Baseball		
Wisconsin	1919	Charles Carpenter	Football		
Michigan	1919	No Award			
Chicago	1920	Charles G. Higgins	Football		
Illinois	1920	John B. Felmley	Basketball/Track & Field		
Indiana	1920	Willard G. Rauschenbach	Baseball		
Iowa	1920	Charles Mockmore	Football		
Minnesota	1920	Norman W. Kingsley	Football/Basketball/Track & Field		
Northwestern	1920	Bruce DeSwarte	Track & Field		
Ohio State	1920	Hal Kime	Baseball		
Purdue	1920	Paul B. Church	Football/Basketball		
Wisconsin	1920	Anthony G. Zulfer	Basketball/Baseball		
Michigan	1920	Carl Johnson	Track & Field		
Chicago	1921	Harold L. Hanisch	Football		
Illinois	1921	John S. Prescott	Track & Field		
Indiana	1921	Everett Dean	Basketball		
Iowa	1921	Robert J. Kaufmann	Football/Basketball		
Minnesota	1921	Neal A. Arnston	Football/Basketball		
Northwestern	1921	Robert W. Townley	Football		
Ohio State	1921	Andy Nemecek	Football		
Purdue	1921	Cecil George Cooley	Football		
Wisconsin	1921	Allan C. Davey	Football		
Michigan	1921	Tad Wieman	Football		
Chicago	1922	Fritz Crisler	Football/Basketball/Baseball		
Illinois	1922	Clarence Crossley	Baseball		
Indiana	1922	William G. McCaw	Football		
Iowa	1922	Aubrey Devine	Football/Basketball/Track & Field		
Minnesota	1922	Arnold Oss	Basketball/Track & Field		
Northwestern	1922	Graham Penfield	Football		
Ohio State	1922	Iolas Huffman	Football/Baseball		
Purdue	1922	Clifford Furnas	Cross Country/Track & Field		
Wisconsin	1922	George Bunge	Football		
Michigan	1922	Robert J. Dunne	Football		
Chicago	1923	Harold A. Fletcher	Football		
Illinois	1923	Otto Vogel	Football/Basketball/Baseball		
Indiana	1923	Omar Held	Wrestling		
Iowa	1923	Gordon Locke	Football/Baseball		
Minnesota	1923	Rudolph Hultkrans	Basketball/Football/Track & Field		
Northwestern	1923	James J. Peterson	Basketball		
Ohio State	1923	Hoge Workman	Football		
Purdue	1923	William R. Swank	Football		
Wisconsin	1923	Gus Tebell	Baseball/Basketball/Football		
Michigan	1923	Paul G. Goebel	Football		
Chicago	1924	Campbell Dickson	Basketball		
Illinois	1924	Wally Roettger	Basketball/Baseball		
Indiana	1924	John Milton Nay	Track & Field		
Iowa	1924	Wayland Hicks	Basketball/Baseball		
Minnesota	1924	Earl Martineau	Football/Track & Field		
Northwestern	1924	Guy William Davis	Football		
Ohio State	1924	Harry Steel	Wrestling/Football		
Purdue	1924	Edward R. Dye	Football/Wrestling		
Wisconsin	1924	Harold J. Bentson	Rowing		
Michigan	1924	Franklin Cappon	Football		
Chicago	1925	Harry G. Frieda	Track & Field		
Illinois	1925	Gilbert J. Roberts	Football		
Indiana	1925	Harlan D. Logan	Basketball/Tennis/Track & Field		
Iowa	1925	John Hancock	Football/Track & Field		
Minnesota	1925	Louis Gross	Football/Track & Field		
Northwestern	1925	Ralph Breyer	Swimming & Diving		
Ohio State	1925	Larry Snyder	Track & Field		
Purdue	1925	Ferdinand J. Wellman	Football/Basketball		
Wisconsin	1925	Lloyd Vallely	Cross Country/Track & Field		
Michigan	1925	William B. Giles	Baseball		
Chicago	1926	Graham A. Kerwin	Football		
Illinois	1926	John Mauer	Basketball		
Indiana	1926	Daniel G. Bernoske	Football		
Iowa	1926	Donald Graham	Football		
Minnesota	1926	Raymond F. Rasey	Basketball/Baseball		
Northwestern	1926	Walter Seidel	Football		
Ohio State	1926	Ralph E. Seiffer	Football		
Purdue	1926	Donald S. Cunningham	Football/Track & Field		
Wisconsin	1926	Stephen H. Polaski	Football		
Michigan	1926	Harold Freyberg	Track & Field		
Chicago	1927	Anton Burg	Track & Field		
Illinois	1927	Doran T. Rue	Track & Field		
Indiana	1927	Charles F. Benzel	Track & Field		
Iowa	1927	Carl D. Voltmer	Football		
Minnesota	1927	Roger Wheeler	Football/Basketball		
Northwestern	1927	Robert W. Johnson	Football		
Ohio State	1927	Harold W. Kennedy	Track & Field		
Purdue	1927	J.E. Little	Country/Track & Field		
Wisconsin	1927	Jefferson DeMent Burrus	Rowing		
Michigan	1927	Paul Samson	Swimming & Diving		
Chicago	1928	Ken Rouse	Football		
Illinois	1928	Richard G. Finn	Baseball		
Indiana	1928	Arthur J. Beckner	Basketball		
Iowa	1928	Lawrence Harrison	Basketball/Baseball		
Minnesota	1928	Malvin J. Nydahl	Baseball/Football/Basketball		
Northwestern	1928	William Droegemueller	Track & Field/Football/Basketball		
Ohio State	1928	Cornelius Ackermann	Football		
Purdue	1928	Harry A. Kemmer	Basketball/Baseball		
Wisconsin	1928	Louis Behr	Basketball		
Michigan	1928	Norman Gabel	Football		
Chicago	1929	Rudolph P. Leyers	Football		
Illinois	1929	Robert B. Orlovich	Track & Field		
Indiana	1929	Wilmer T. Rinehart	Track & Field		
Iowa	1929	Forrest Twogood	Basketball		
Minnesota	1929	George MacKinnon	Basketball/Football/Track & Field		
Northwestern	1929	Bertrand Fox	Football		
Ohio State	1929	William P. Tooley	Track & Field		
Purdue	1929	C.S. Lyle	Basketball/Baseball		
Wisconsin	1929	Theodore A. Thelander	Baseball/Basketball/Football		
Michigan	1929	Ernie McCoy	Baseball		
Chicago	1930	Harold E. Hayden	Track & Field		
Illinois	1930	Richard C. Oeler	Gymnastics		
Indiana	1930	William E. Clapham	Track & Field		
Iowa	1930	Willis Glassgow	Football/Baseball		
Minnesota	1930	Bob Tanner	Football/Basketball/Baseball		
Northwestern	1930	Richard L. Hinch	Swimming & Diving		
Ohio State	1930	Joseph A. Ujhelyi	Football		
Purdue	1930	Elmer Sleight	Football		
Wisconsin	1930	Donald W. Meikeljohn	Tennis		
Michigan	1930	Edwin B. Poorman	Football		
Chicago	1931	Dale Allen Letts	Track & Field		
Illinois	1931	Lee Sentman	Track & Field		
Indiana	1931	James E. Hatfield	Track & Field		
Iowa	1931	No Award			
Minnesota	1931	Lowell Marsh	Swimming & Diving		
Northwestern	1931	Laurence E. Oliphant	Football		
Ohio State	1931	Charles R. Larkins	Football/Basketball		
Purdue	1931	George Van Bibber	Football/Baseball		
Wisconsin	1931	Louis E. Oberdeck	Rowing		
Michigan	1931	J. Perry Austin	Track & Field		
Chicago	1932	Everett C. Olson	Gymnastics		
Illinois	1932	Edward F. Gbur	Baseball		
Indiana	1932	Henry A. Brocksmith	Cross Country/Track & Field		
Iowa	1932	Stuart W. Skowbo	Track & Field		
Minnesota	1932	Earl W. Loose	Basketball/Baseball		
Northwestern	1932	Volney C. Wilson	Swimming & Diving		
Ohio State	1932	James R. Bachman	Wrestling		
Purdue	1932	John R. Wooden	Basketball		
Wisconsin	1932	Harvey H. Schneider	Basketball		
Michigan	1932	Edwin F. Russell	Track & Field		
Chicago	1933	Keith I. Parsons	Basketball/Football		
Illinois	1933	R. Dean Woolsey	Track & Field/Cross Country		
Indiana	1933	Noble L. Biddinger	Track & Field		
Iowa	1933	William A. McCloy	Swimming & Diving		
Minnesota	1933	Kenneth Gay	Football/Baseball		
Northwestern	1933	Kenneth A. Willard	Swimming & Diving		
Ohio State	1933	Jack Keller	Track & Field		
Purdue	1933	Roy Horstmann	Football		
Wisconsin	1933	Nello Anthony Pacetti	Football		
Michigan	1933	Ivy Williamson	Football		
Chicago	1934	George H. Wrighte	Gymnastics		
Illinois	1934	Ralph J. Epstein	Fencing		
Indiana	1934	Raymond F. Dauer	Football		
Iowa	1934	Tom W. Moore	Track & Field		
Minnesota	1934	Marshall Wells	Football		
Northwestern	1934	Donald Brewer	Basketball		
Ohio State	1934	Bartlette Ewell	Swimming & Diving		
Purdue	1934	Dutch Fehring	Football/Basketball/Baseball		
Wisconsin	1934	Robert A. Schiller	Wrestling		
Michigan	1934	Jim Cristy	Swimming & Diving		
Chicago	1935	Ellmore C. Patterson Jr.	Football		
Illinois	1935	Irving Seeley	Track & Field		
Indiana	1935	Don Veller	Football		
Iowa	1935	James P. McClintock	Swimming & Diving		
Minnesota	1935	Robert Tanner	Football		
Northwestern	1935	Chester H. Taylor	Swimming & Diving		
Ohio State	1935	No Award			
Purdue	1935	Carl Heldt	Football		
Wisconsin	1935	Rolf Falk Poser	Basketball		
Michigan	1935	Harvey Smith	Track & Field		
Chicago	1936	Gordon C. Peterson	Basketball		
Illinois	1936	Arthur Fisher	Gymnastics		
Indiana	1936	Reed H. Kelso	Football		
Iowa	1936	Francis X. Cretzmeyer	Track & Field		
Minnesota	1936	Glenn Seidel	Football/Hockey		
Northwestern	1936	Curtis M. Shanahan	Water Polo/Baseball		
Ohio State	1936	Bruce B. Laybourne	Basketball		
Purdue	1936	Robert Kessler	Basketball		
Wisconsin	1936	Howard Thurston Heun	Rowing		
Michigan	1936	Harvey W. Patton	Track & Field		
Chicago	1937	Floyd R. Stauffer	Swimming & Diving		
Illinois	1937	Harry Combes	Basketball		
Indiana	1937	Vernon R. Huffman	Basketball		
Iowa	1937	Cornelius J. Walker	Football		
Minnesota	1937	Bud Wilkinson	Football/Hockey/Golf		
Northwestern	1937	Albert Adelman	Tennis/Football		
Ohio State	1937	Inwood Smith	Football		
Purdue	1937	Glynn Downey	Basketball		
Wisconsin	1937	Leonard L. Lovshin	Football		
Michigan	1937	John A. Gee	Baseball		
Chicago	1938	George C. Harcrow	Track & Field		
Illinois	1938	Allen Sapora	Wrestling		
Indiana	1938	Charles E. McDaniel	Wrestling		
Iowa	1938	Bob Lannon	Football		
Minnesota	1938	Dominic Krezowski	Track & Field		
Northwestern	1938	Dan Zehr	Swimming & Diving		
Ohio State	1938	Ralph C. Wolf	Football		
Purdue	1938	Martin A. Schreyer	Football		
Wisconsin	1938	Charles H. Fensk	Cross Country/Track & Field		
Michigan	1938	John Townsend	Track & Field		
Chicago	1939	Robert E. Cassels	Basketball/Track & Field		
Illinois	1939	Archie Deuschman	Wrestling		
Indiana	1939	Chris Traicoff	Wrestling		
Iowa	1939	Wilbur V. Nead	Football		
Minnesota	1939	John Kundla	Basketball/Baseball		
Northwestern	1939	Marvin Wachman	Tennis		
Ohio State	1939	James A. Whittaker	Cross Country/Track & Field		
Purdue	1939	Joe Mihal	Football		
Wisconsin	1939	Walter Bietila	Baseball		
Michigan	1939	Leo C. Beebe	Baseball		
Chicago	1940	Martin Levit	Baseball		
Illinois	1940	Frank E. Richart Jr.	Golf		
Indiana	1940	Robert I. Hoke	Track & Field		
Iowa	1940	Andrew J. Kantor	Baseball		
Minnesota	1940	Hal Van Every	Football/Basketball		
Northwestern	1940	John Thomas Ryan	Football		
Ohio State	1940	Esco Sarkkinen	Football		
Purdue	1940	Richard C. Potter	Football		
Wisconsin	1940	Ralph H. Moeller	Football		
Michigan	1940	James R. Rae	Track & Field		
Chicago	1941	James Lloyd Ray	Track & Field		
Illinois	1941	Park Brown	Track & Field/Cross Country		
Indiana	1941	Harold L. Zimmer	Football		
Iowa	1941	James R. Murphy Jr.	Football		
Minnesota	1941	George Franck	Football/Track & Field		
Northwestern	1941	Glenn E. Thistlewait	Football		
Ohio State	1941	Clifford P. Morgan	Baseball		
Purdue	1941	William J. Neff	Football		
Wisconsin	1941	Kenneth E. Bixby	Baseball		
Michigan	1941	Forest Evashevski	Football		
Chicago	1942	Calvin P. Sawyier	Tennis		
Illinois	1942	William Hocking	Basketball		
Indiana	1942	Hugh B. McAdams	Track & Field		
Iowa	1942	Richard E. Hein	Basketball/Baseball		
Minnesota	1942	Eugene Flick	Football/Baseball		
Northwestern	1942	Richard Erditz	Football		
Ohio State	1942	Benjamin P. Burtt	Fencing		
Purdue	1942	Paul B. Anthony	Track & Field		
Wisconsin	1942	Burleigh E. Jacobs	Golf		
Michigan	1942	David M. Nelson	Football		
Chicago	1943	Haymond Siever	Fencing		
Illinois	1943	Edwin S. Parker	Basketball/Baseball		
Indiana	1943	Fred Huff	Football		
Iowa	1943	Tom Farmer	Football		
Minnesota	1943	Christie Geankoplis	Tennis		
Northwestern	1943	Russell Wendland	Basketball		
Ohio State	1943	Bill Vickroy	Football		
Purdue	1943	Allen Carl Menke	Basketball		
Wisconsin	1943	Fred Rehm	Basketball		
Michigan	1943	George Ceithaml	Football		
Chicago	1944	Edward A. Cooperrider	Baseball		
Illinois	1944	Warren F. Goodell	Track & Field		
Indiana	1944	No Award			
Iowa	1944	No Award			
Minnesota	1944	Stuart A. Olson	Baseball		
Northwestern	1944	Arthur Nethercot Jr.	Wrestling		
Ohio State	1944	George R. Hoeflinger	Track & Field		
Purdue	1944	No Award			
Wisconsin	1944	Edward M. Dzirbik	Wrestling		
Michigan	1944	Paul White	Football		
Illinois	1945	Donald Delaney	Basketball		
Indiana	1945	No Award			
Iowa	1945	No Award			
Minnesota	1945	Arnold Lehrman	Basketball/Baseball		
Northwestern	1945	Ben Schadler	Baseball/Basketball/Football		
Ohio State	1945	Jack Dugger	Football/Basketball/Track & Field		
Purdue	1945	Joseph Allen Collings	Football		
Wisconsin	1945	Ken Chandler	Track & Field		
Michigan	1945	Bob Wiese	Football		
Illinois	1946	Robert Phelps	Track & Field		
Indiana	1946	No Award			
Iowa	1946	Arthur Harold Johnson	Football		
Minnesota	1946	John Adams	Tennis/Hockey		
Northwestern	1946	Andrew Ivy	Football		
Ohio State	1946	Donald Steinberg	Football		
Purdue	1946	Thomas P. Hughes	Football/Baseball		
Wisconsin	1946	Jerry Thompson	Football		
Michigan	1946	Bliss Bowman Jr.	Baseball		
Illinois	1947	Robert Richards	Track & Field		
Indiana	1947	Ralph Hamilton	Basketball		
Iowa	1947	John Kenneth Hunter	Track & Field		
Minnesota	1947	Robert Sandberg	Football		
Northwestern	1947	John Hennerich	Baseball		
Ohio State	1947	Warren Amling	Football/Basketball		
Purdue	1947	Myrwin Anderson	Basketball/Baseball		
Wisconsin	1947	Exner Menzel	Basketball		
Michigan	1947	Paul G. White	Football		
Illinois	1948	George Fischer	Baseball		
Indiana	1948	Leroy Thomas Deal	Track & Field		
Iowa	1948	Herb Wilkinson	Track & Field		
Minnesota	1948	Steve Silianoff	Football		
Northwestern	1948	Charles Tourek	Basketball		
Ohio State	1948	Robert O. Jabbusch	Football		
Purdue	1948	Hank Stram	Football		
Wisconsin	1948	Carlyle Fay Jr.	Rowing		
Michigan	1948	Jack Weisenburger	Football		
Illinois	1949	Dwight Eddleman	Football/Basketball/Track & Field		
Indiana	1949	Joseph Lawecki	Baseball		
Iowa	1949	Evan Hultman	Cross Country/Track & Field		
Minnesota	1949	James B. Peterson	Gymnastics/Track & Field		
Northwestern	1949	Bill Heusner	Swimming & Diving		
Ohio State	1949	Lloyd T. Duff	Track & Field		
Purdue	1949	Keith E. Carter	Swimming & Diving		
Wisconsin	1949	Donald R. Peterson	Rowing		
Michigan	1949	Pete Elliott	Football		
Illinois	1950	Russell W. Steger	Football/Baseball		
Indiana	1950	Walter C. Bartkiewicz	Football		
Iowa	1950	Donald C. Hays	Basketball		
Minnesota	1950	Richard S. Kilty	Track & Field/Cross Country		
Northwestern	1950	Donald M. Burson	Football		
Ohio State	1950	Bruce Harlan	Swimming & Diving		
Purdue	1950	Norbert H. Adams	Football/Baseball		
Wisconsin	1950	Robert J. Wilson	Football		
Michigan	1950	Thomas R. Peterson	Football		
Illinois	1951	Don Laz	Football/Track & Field		
Indiana	1951	John H. Phillips	Baseball		
Iowa	1951	Ralph W. Thomas	Wrestling		
Minnesota	1951	Whitey Skoog	Basketball		
Northwestern	1951	Donald C. Blasius	Basketball		
Ohio State	1951	Richard D. Widdoes	Football		
Purdue	1951	Neil Schmidt	Football/Basketball		
Wisconsin	1951	David Staiger	Track & Field		
Michigan	1951	Leo Koceski	Football		
Michigan State	1951	Sonny Grandelius	Football		
Illinois	1952	Richard Calisch	Track & Field		
Indiana	1952	Robert Watson Masters	Basketball		
Iowa	1952	Chuck Darling	Basketball/Track & Field		
Minnesota	1952	Richard K. Means	Basketball/Tennis		
Northwestern	1952	Richard H. Alban	Football		
Ohio State	1952	Stewart Hein	Baseball		
Purdue	1952	John G. Durham	Football		
Wisconsin	1952	Walter E. Deike	Cross Country/Track & Field		
Michigan	1952	Don McEwen	Track & Field		
Michigan State	1952	Orris Bender	Wrestling		
Illinois	1953	Clive Follmer	Basketball/Baseball		
Indiana	1953	George Bell	Football		
Iowa	1953	Burt Britzmann	Football		
Minnesota	1953	Robert D. Gelle	Basketball/Football		
Northwestern	1953	Raymond W. Huizinga	Football		
Ohio State	1953	Jerry F. Welbourn	Track & Field		
Purdue	1953	Walter R. Viellieu	Football/Wrestling		
Wisconsin	1953	James T. Moran	Football/Rowing		
Michigan	1953	David J. Tinkham	Football		
Michigan State	1953	John D. Wilson	Football		
Illinois	1954	Robert Lenzini	Football/Track & Field		
Indiana	1954	Ernest Duane Gomer	Tennis		
Iowa	1954	Bill Fenton	Football		
Minnesota	1954	Paul Giel	Football/Baseball		
Northwestern	1954	Lawrence E. Kurka	Basketball		
Ohio State	1954	Paul Ebert	Basketball/Baseball		
Purdue	1954	Gene R. Mathews	Track & Field		
Wisconsin	1954	Norbert J. Esser	Basketball/Football/Track & Field		
Michigan	1954	Richard E. Balzhiser	Football		
Michigan State	1954	Bob Hoke	Wrestling		
Illinois	1955	Edwin G. Jackson Jr.	Wrestling		
Indiana	1955	Arthur Michael Cusick Jr.	Track & Field		
Iowa	1955	LeRoy Anton Ebert	Track & Field		
Minnesota	1955	Chuck Mencel	Basketball		
Northwestern	1955	Sigmund Niepokoj	Football		
Ohio State	1955	Richard Allen Young	Football		
Purdue	1955	Dennis C. Blind	Basketball/Baseball		
Wisconsin	1955	Richard W. Cable	Basketball		
Michigan	1955	J. Daniel Cline	Football		
Michigan State	1955	Kevan Gosper	Track & Field		
Illinois	1956	Daniel E. Dudas	Baseball		
Indiana	1956	Samuel L. Reed	Baseball		
Iowa	1956	Andrew Hough	Football/Basketball		
Minnesota	1956	Darrell R. Cochran	Football/Baseball		
Northwestern	1956	Alfred John Kuhn	Swimming & Diving		
Ohio State	1956	Arthur Chas. Borror	Fencing		
Purdue	1956	Joe Sexson	Basketball/Baseball		
Wisconsin	1956	Bob Konovsky	Football/Wrestling		
Michigan	1956	James M. Kruthers	Swimming & Diving		
Michigan State	1956	Carl Nystrom	Football		
Illinois	1957	Robert Dintelmann	Track & Field/Cross Country		
Indiana	1957	Harold Richard Neal	Basketball		
Iowa	1957	Frank Otis Sebolt	Basketball		
Minnesota	1957	Bob Hobert	Football		
Northwestern	1957	John Smith	Football		
Ohio State	1957	Albert Wiggins	Swimming & Diving		
Purdue	1957	Joe Campbell	Basketball/Golf		
Wisconsin	1957	Patrick J. Levenhagen	Football		
Michigan	1957	Terry Barr	Football		
Michigan State	1957	Selwyn Jones	Track & Field		
Illinois	1958	Lee Sentman	Fencing		
Indiana	1958	Greg Bell	Track & Field		
Iowa	1958	Gary E. Meyer	Wrestling		
Minnesota	1958	Jack McCartan	Hockey/Baseball		
Northwestern	1958	Tom Scheuerman	Baseball		
Ohio State	1958	Donald Harper	Gymnastics		
Purdue	1958	William Royce Stroud	Baseball		
Wisconsin	1958	Walter V. (Bunk) Holt	Basketball/Baseball		
Michigan	1958	James B. Orwig	Football		
Michigan State	1958	Robert W. Jasson	Hockey		
Illinois	1959	Abraham Grossfeld	Gymnastics		
Indiana	1959	Ronald L. Walden	Gymnastics		
Iowa	1959	James Van Young	Track & Field		
Minnesota	1959	Perry Gehring	Football		
Northwestern	1959	Andy Cvercko	Football		
Ohio State	1959	Larry P. Huston	Basketball		
Purdue	1959	Walter Eversman	Swimming & Diving		
Wisconsin	1959	John R. Hobbs	Basketball/Football/Track & Field		
Michigan	1959	Walter N. Johnson	Football		
Michigan State	1959	Bob Anderegg	Basketball		
Illinois	1960	Robert J. Madix	Baseball		
Indiana	1960	Donald G. Noone	Football		
Iowa	1960	William Lloyd Voxman	Tennis		
Minnesota	1960	Orville Peterson	Swimming & Diving		
Northwestern	1960	Arthur Kraft	Wrestling		
Ohio State	1960	Richard L. Furry	Basketball		
Purdue	1960	John P. Konsek	Golf		
Wisconsin	1960	Dale L. Hackbart	Football		
Michigan	1960	Terry O. Miller	Basketball		
Michigan State	1960	Stanley Tarshis	Gymnastics		
Illinois	1961	Charles Campbell	Fencing		
Indiana	1961	Gary V. Long	Basketball		
Iowa	1961	William Davis Buck	Gymnastics		
Minnesota	1961	Robert J. Schwarzkopf	Gymnastics		
Northwestern	1961	Mike Stock	Football		
Ohio State	1961	Richard H. Hoyt	Basketball		
Purdue	1961	Robert T. Orrill	Basketball		
Wisconsin	1961	Gerald L. Kulcinski	Football		
Michigan	1961	Dave Gillanders	Swimming & Diving		
Michigan State	1961	William Reynolds	Track & Field/Cross Country		
Illinois	1962	Stuart R. Cohn	Fencing		
Indiana	1962	Willard Elyea	Baseball		
Iowa	1962	Joel D. Novak	Basketball		
Minnesota	1962	James A. Fischer	Track & Field		
Northwestern	1962	Boyd C. Melvin	Football		
Ohio State	1962	Roger K. Beck	Lacrosse		
Purdue	1962	John D. Vogel	Swimming & Diving		
Wisconsin	1962	Thomas M. Hughbanks	Baseball/Basketball/Football/Track & Field		
Michigan	1962	Thomas N. Osterland	Gymnastics		
Michigan State	1962	Edward J. Ryan	Football		
Illinois	1963	Dave Downey	Basketball		
Indiana	1963	Chet Jastremski	Swimming & Diving		
Iowa	1963	Ralph W. Trimble	Track & Field		
Minnesota	1963	Robert J. Bateman	Basketball		
Northwestern	1963	Paul Flatley	Football		
Ohio State	1963	Jerry R. Lucas	Basketball		
Purdue	1963	Ron Meyer	Football		
Wisconsin	1963	Hugh V. (Pat) Richter	Baseball/Basketball/Football		
Michigan	1963	Charles F. Aquino	Track & Field		
Michigan State	1963	Richard Schloemer	Fencing		
Illinois	1964	Richard W. Deller	Football		
Indiana	1964	James L. Binkley	Tennis		
Iowa	1964	Andrew J. Hankins	Basketball		
Minnesota	1964	Arthur (Bill) Davis	Basketball/Baseball		
Northwestern	1964	Marty Riessen	Tennis/Basketball		
Ohio State	1964	Donald H. Flatt	Basketball		
Purdue	1964	Mel Garland	Basketball/Baseball		
Wisconsin	1964	William R. Smith	Track & Field		
Michigan	1964	Gordon Wilkie	Hockey		
Michigan State	1964	Peter Gent	Basketball		
Illinois	1965	G. Bogie Redmon	Basketball/Track & Field		
Indiana	1965	Douglas H. Spicer	Football		
Iowa	1965	Glenn Gailis	Gymnastics		
Minnesota	1965	Walter P. Richardson	Swimming & Diving		
Northwestern	1965	Tom Myers	Football		
Ohio State	1965	Arnold M. Chonko	Football		
Purdue	1965	William B. Howard	Football		
Wisconsin	1965	Gary V. Kirk	Tennis		
Michigan	1965	Bob Timberlake	Football		
Michigan State	1965	David Price	Gymnastics		
Illinois	1966	Jim Grabowski	Football		
Indiana	1966	Wayne L. Witmer	Baseball		
Iowa	1966	James M. Moses	Basketball		
Minnesota	1966	Paul T. Faust	Football		
Northwestern	1966	Richard T. Abrahams	Swimming & Diving		
Ohio State	1966	Donald V. Unverferth	Football		
Purdue	1966	Dave Schellhase	Basketball		
Wisconsin	1966	David N. Fronek	Football		
Michigan	1966	J. Karl Hedrick	Tennis		
Michigan State	1966	Stephen A. Juday	Football		
Illinois	1967	Robert J. Bachman	Swimming		
Indiana	1967	Kenneth Sitzberger	Swimming & Diving		
Iowa	1967	Kenneth Gordon	Gymnastics		
Minnesota	1967	Thomas G. Heinonen	Track & Field/Cross Country		
Northwestern	1967	Kenneth C. Ramsey	Football		
Ohio State	1967	Willard F. Sander	Football		
Purdue	1967	Robert A. Griese	Football		
Wisconsin	1967	Dennis J. Sweeney	Baseball		
Michigan	1967	David R. Fisher	Football		
Michigan State	1967	Gene Washington	Football/Track & Field		
Illinois	1968	Paul Gary Shapin	Gymnastics		
Indiana	1968	Stanely Eugene Denisar	Wrestling		
Iowa	1968	Tony Williams	Football		
Minnesota	1968	Gary Gambucci	Hockey		
Northwestern	1968	Thomas A. Garretson	Football		
Ohio State	1968	Bill Hosket Jr.	Basketball		
Purdue	1968	James P. Beime	Football		
Wisconsin	1968	Michael Gluck	Wrestling		
Michigan	1968	Dick Vidmer	Football		
Michigan State	1968	Dale Anderson	Wrestling		
Illinois	1969	Dennis A. Rott	Wrestling		
Indiana	1969	Richard A. Fuhs	Track & Field		
Iowa	1969	Scott Miller	Football		
Minnesota	1969	Noel Jenke	Football/Hockey/Baseball		
Northwestern	1969	Ralph Schultz	Track & Field		
Ohio State	1969	Dave Foley	Football/Track & Field		
Purdue	1969	Chuck Kyle	Football		
Wisconsin	1969	Karl Rudat	Football		
Michigan	1969	Ronald A. Johnson	Football		
Michigan State	1969	Al Brenner	Football		
Illinois	1970	Lawrence B. Schwartz	Fencing		
Indiana	1970	William H. Wolfe	Football		
Iowa	1970	Richard Jensen	Basketball		
Minnesota	1970	David A. Cosgrove	Baseball		
Northwestern	1970	Bruce Hubbard	Football		
Ohio State	1970	Bruce T. Trott	Gymnastics		
Purdue	1970	Michael E. Phipps	Football		
Wisconsin	1970	Douglas R. McFadyen	Hockey		
Michigan	1970	Mark W. Henry	Baseball		
Michigan State	1970	Rich Saul	Football		
Illinois	1971	Ernest Clements	Tennis		
Indiana	1971	Mark Stevens	Football		
Iowa	1971	Craig Sandvig	Tennis		
Minnesota	1971	Wally Olds	Hockey		
Northwestern	1971	John Rodman	Football		
Ohio State	1971	Jim Cleamons	Basketball		
Purdue	1971	George Faerber	Basketball		
Wisconsin	1971	Don Vandrey	Track & Field		
Michigan	1971	Richard Rydze	Swimming & Diving		
Michigan State	1971	Thomas Muir	Wrestling		
Illinois	1972	Robert Bucklin	Football		
Indiana	1972	Chuck Thomson	Swimming & Diving		
Iowa	1972	Dave Triplett	Football		
Minnesota	1972	Craig Lincoln	Swimming & Diving		
Northwestern	1972	Maurie Daigneau	Football		
Ohio State	1972	Rick Simon	Football		
Purdue	1972	Bob Ford	Basketball		
Wisconsin	1972	Pat Matzdorf	Track & Field		
Michigan	1972	Bruce N. Elliott	Football		
Michigan State	1972	Herb Washington	Track & Field		
Illinois	1973	Robert J. Mango	Track & Field		
Indiana	1973	Gary Hall Sr.	Swimming & Diving		
Iowa	1973	Daniel Sherman	Wrestling		
Minnesota	1973	James T. Brewer	Basketball		
Northwestern	1973	Gregory J. Strunk	Football		
Ohio State	1973	David A. Hoyles	Hockey		
Purdue	1973	James H. Pratt	Baseball		
Wisconsin	1973	Keith D. Nosbusch	Football		
Michigan	1973	Godfrey Murray	Track & Field		
Michigan State	1973	Ken Popejoy	Track & Field		
Illinois	1974	Howard Beck	Gymnastics		
Indiana	1974	Daniel F. Hayes	Track & Field		
Iowa	1974	Carl Walin	Gymnastics		
Minnesota	1974	Garry Bjorklund	Cross Country/Track & Field		
Northwestern	1974	Steven A. Craig	Football		
Ohio State	1974	Randy Gradishar	Football		
Purdue	1974	Jeffrey T. Bolin	Track & Field		
Wisconsin	1974	Gary D. Anderson	Basketball		
Michigan	1974	David D. Gallagher	Football		
Michigan State	1974	Robert Cassleman	Track & Field		
Illinois	1975	Howard Beck	Gymnastics		
Indiana	1975	Orlando Fernandez	Gymnastics		
Iowa	1975	Robert C. Fick	Football		
Minnesota	1975	Mike Polich	Hockey		
Northwestern	1975	David A. Froehlich	Wrestling		
Ohio State	1975	Patrick T. Moore	Swimming & Diving		
Purdue	1975	Lawrence G. Burton Jr.	Football/Track & Field		
Wisconsin	1975	James R. Dyreby Jr.	Rowing		
Michigan	1975	Jerry Karzen	Tennis		
Michigan State	1975	Dennis Olmstead	Hockey		
Illinois	1976	Glenn Hummell	Tennis		
Indiana	1976	Bruce Dickson	Swimming & Diving		
Iowa	1976	Bob Elliott	Football		
Minnesota	1976	Jeffrey N. LaFleur	Gymnastics		
Northwestern	1976	Kim Girkins	Football		
Ohio State	1976	Brian Baschnagel	Football		
Purdue	1976	Ken Novak	Football		
Wisconsin	1976	Patrick J. Christenso	Wrestling		
Michigan	1976	Richard Walterhouse	Baseball		
Michigan State	1976	Patrick Milkovich	Wrestling		
Illinois	1977	Craig Virgin	Track & Field/Cross Country		
Indiana	1977	James P. Montgomery	Swimming & Diving		
Iowa	1977	Rick Zussman	Tennis		
Minnesota	1977	Tony Dungy	Football		
Northwestern	1977	Randy Dean	Football		
Ohio State	1977	John Sandlund	Track & Field		
Purdue	1977	Bruce Parkinson	Basketball		
Wisconsin	1977	Peter W. Brey	Basketball		
Michigan	1977	Steve Grote	Basketball		
Michigan State	1977	Tyrone Willingham	Football/Baseball		
Illinois	1978	Steve Yasukawa	Gymnastics		
Indiana	1978	Richard R. Hofstetter	Swimming & Diving		
Iowa	1978	Rod Sears	Football		
Minnesota	1978	Timothy J. LaFleur	Gymnastics		
Northwestern	1978	Alan E. Marzano	Wrestling		
Ohio State	1978	Frank D’Amico	Swimming & Diving		
Purdue	1978	Noel Ruebel	Track & Field		
Wisconsin	1978	Mike Eaves	Hockey		
Michigan	1978	Derek Howard	Football		
Michigan State	1978	Larry Bethea	Football		
Illinois	1979	John Davis	Gymnastics		
Indiana	1979	David Abrams	Football		
Iowa	1979	Tim Gutshall	Football		
Minnesota	1979	Bill Baker	Hockey		
Northwestern	1979	Scott Stranski	Baseball		
Ohio State	1979	Doug Dillie	Baseball		
Purdue	1979	Joe Menzyk	Track & Field		
Wisconsin	1979	Steve Lacy	Cross Country/Track & Field		
Michigan	1979	Mark Churella	Wrestling		
Michigan State	1979	Greg Kelser	Basketball		
Illinois	1980	Dave Stoldt	Gymnastics		
Indiana	1980	Marc Schlatter	Swimming & Diving		
Iowa	1980	Dan Glenn	Wrestling		
Minnesota	1980	Dan Zilverberg	Wrestling		
Northwestern	1980	Mike Campbell	Basketball		
Ohio State	1980	Stephen Crane	Track & Field		
Purdue	1980	Ken Loushin	Football		
Wisconsin	1980	Thoams G. Stauss	Football		
Michigan	1980	George Foussianes	Baseball		
Michigan State	1980	Mark Brammer	Football		
Illinois	1981	John Kakacek	Wrestling		
Indiana	1981	Kevin Speer	Football		
Iowa	1981	Steve Waite	Basketball		
Minnesota	1981	Tom Lehman	Golf		
Northwestern	1981	Jim Ford	Football		
Ohio State	1981	Mike Wukelic	Soccer		
Purdue	1981	Brian Walker	Basketball		
Wisconsin	1981	David C. Goodspeed	Wrestling		
Michigan	1981	John Wangler	Football		
Michigan State	1981	Jay Vincent	Basketball		
Illinois	1982	Randy Conte	Baseball	Lisa Robinson	Basketball
Indiana	1982	Bob Stephenson	Football	Karen Marincek	Golf
Iowa	1982	Brad Webb	Football	No Award	
Minnesota	1982	Brian Meeker	Gymnastics	Chris Curry-Gentz	Swimming & Diving
Northwestern	1982	Bob Grady	Basketball	Patience Vanderbush	Basketball
Ohio State	1982	Gregory Rake	Baseball	Karen Callaghan	Synchronized Swimming & Diving
Purdue	1982	Tim Seneff	Football	Anne McMenany	Volleyball
Wisconsin	1982	David Mohapp	Football	Ann French	Badminton
Michigan	1982	Jim Paciorek	Baseball	Diane Dietz	Basketball
Michigan State	1982	Morten Andersen	Football	Lisa Speaker	Golf
Illinois	1983	Rich Baader	Track & Field	Mary Ellen Murphy	Golf
Indiana	1983	Tony Nelson	Baseball	Patricia Eiting	Track & Field
Iowa	1983	Ed Banach	Wrestling	Kerry Stewart	Swimming & Diving
Minnesota	1983	Randy Breuer	Basketball	Jill Halsted	Volleyball
Northwestern	1983	Jeff Munn	Fencing	Sue Hebson	Softball
Ohio State	1983	Sam Linzell	Gymnastics	Nancy Pearson	Swimming & Diving
Ohio State	1983	Joe Smith	Football		
Ohio State	1983	Steven Hirsch	Track & Field		
Purdue	1983	Jack Farson	Cross Country/Track & Field	Jane Neff	Volleyball
Wisconsin	1983	David Farley	Golf	Rose Thomson	Cross country/Track & field
Michigan	1983	Brian Diemer	Track & Field	Melanie Weaver	Track & Field
Michigan State	1983	Mike Brown	Swimming & Diving	Karen Wells	Basketball
Illinois	1984	Kerry Dickson	Track & Field	Karen Kurreck	Gymnastics
Indiana	1984	George Gianokopolous	Football	Lynne Beck	Volleyball
Iowa	1984	Dave Ross	Swimming & Diving	Lisa Anderson	Basketball
Minnesota	1984	Joey Ray	Gymnastics	Nancy Harris	Golf
Northwestern	1984	John Kidd	Football	Lorie Miller	Volleyball
Ohio State	1984	John Frank	Football	Kelly Robinson	Basketball
Purdue	1984	Adam Abele	Tennis	Jan Hoosline	Volleyball
Wisconsin	1984	John Johannson	Hockey	Janet Huff	Basketball
Michigan	1984	Stefan Humphries	Football	Alison Noble	Volleyball
Michigan State	1984	Kelly Miller	Hockey	Anne Pewe	Cross country/Track & field
Illinois	1985	Peter Bouton	Tennis	Sue Arildsen	Tennis
Indiana	1985	Uwe Blab	Basketball	Kelly Greenlee	Cross country
Iowa	1985	Rob Moellering	Tennis	Dee Ann Davidson	Volleyball
Minnesota	1985	Dave Morrison	Track & Field/Cross Country	Jocelyn Smith	Golf
Northwestern	1985	Jim Bobbitt	Football	Anucha Browne Sanders	Basketball
Ohio State	1985	Robert Playter	Gymnastics	Sarah Josephson	Synchronized Swimming & Diving
Purdue	1985	Steve Reid	Basketball	Annette Bauer	Volleyball
Wisconsin	1985	John Easker	Cross country/Track & field	Cathy Branta	Cross country/Track & field
Michigan	1985	Ken Hayward	Baseball	Andrea Williams	Volleyball
Michigan State	1985	Carlton Evans	Lacrosse	Kelly Belanger	Basketball
Illinois	1986	Jim Juriga	Football	Christy Flesvig	Tennis
Indiana	1986	Terry Brahm	Track & Field	Lynn Dennison	Golf
Iowa	1986	Larry Station	Football	Marcia Pankratz	Field hockey
Minnesota	1986	Ron Backes	Track & Field	Jody Eder	Cross country/Track & field
Northwestern	1986	Joe Girardi	Baseball	Amy Kekeisen	Field hockey/Softball
Ohio State	1986	Mike Lanese	Football	Adrian Lehman	Synchronized swimming & diving
Purdue	1986	Jim Everett	Football	Cheryl Flowers	Volleyball
Wisconsin	1986	Tim Hacker	Cross Country/Track & Field	Lisa Fortman	Tennis
Michigan	1986	Casey Close	Baseball	Sue Schroeder	Cross Country
Michigan State	1986	Donald McSween	Hockey	Julie Polakowski	Basketball
Illinois	1987	Graeme McGufficke	Swimming	Jonelle Polk	Basketball
Indiana	1987	Steve Alford	Basketball	Karleen Moore	Softball
Iowa	1987	Andy Wiese	Track & Field	Karen Napoliatano	Field Hockey
Minnesota	1987	Collin Godkin	Gymnastics	Sue Roell	Swimming & Diving
Northwestern	1987	Bob Dirkes	Football	Jennifer Averill	Field Hockey
Ohio State	1987	Mike Wantuck	Swimming & Diving	Kathy Zittel	Synchronized Swimming & Diving
Purdue	1987	Kevin Gregory	Tennis	Karen Moschetto	Field Hockey
Wisconsin	1987	J. J. Weber	Basketball	Amy Justeson	Swimming & Diving
Michigan	1987	Ken Higgins	Football	Heidi Cohen	Gymnastics
Michigan State	1987	Dean Altobelli	Football	Lisa Marino	Golf
Illinois	1988	Tim Simon	Track & Field	Disa Johnson	Volleyball
Indiana	1988	Sven Salumaa	Tennis	Karen Dunham	Volleyball
Iowa	1988	Mike Flagg	Football	Liz Tchou	Field Hockey
Minnesota	1988	Paul Gisselquist	Cross Country/Track & Field	Rochele Goetz	Volleyball
Northwestern	1988	Shon Morris	Basketball	Barb Harris	Swimming & Diving
Ohio State	1988	Ron Gharbo	Wrestling	Karen LaFace	Swimming & Diving
Purdue	1988	Bob Stolz	Cross Country/Track & Field	Sharon Versyp	Basketball
Wisconsin	1988	Paul Gruber	Football	Chris Gilles	Tennis
Michigan	1988	Jonathan Morris	Tennis	Tina Basle	Tennis
Michigan State	1988	Mike Davidson	Baseball	Kim Hartwick	Gymnastics
Illinois	1989	Peter Freund	Football	Chris Schwarz	Volleyball
Indiana	1989	Simon Katner	Soccer	Ann Mooney	Basketball
Iowa	1989	Paul Wozniak	Gymnastics	Deb Robertson	Field Hockey
Minnesota	1989	Mike Zechmeister	Swimming & Diving	Kate Hughes	Golf
Northwestern	1989	Mark Whitehead	Wrestling	Lori Holmes	Swimming & Diving
Ohio State	1989	Ted Glavas	Tennis	Michelle Schulte	Gymnastics
Ohio State	1989	Scott Powell	Football		
Purdue	1989	John Stein	Cross Country/Track & Field	Barbara Meeker	Volleyball
Wisconsin	1989	Dave Lee	Wrestling	Maureen Hartzheim	Cross Country/Track & Field
Michigan	1989	John Scherer	Track & Field	Traci Babcock	Track & Field
Michigan State	1989	Danton Cole	Hockey	Mary Schoenle	Swimming & Diving
Illinois	1990	John Murray	Tennis	Celena Mondie-Milner	Track & Field
Indiana	1990	Scott Holman	Wrestling	Julie Goedde	Volleyball
Iowa	1990	Brian Wujick	Baseball	Erica Richards	Field Hockey
Minnesota	1990	Chuck Heise	Wrestling	Marie Roethlisberger	Gymnastics
Northwestern	1990	Jack Griffin	Wrestling	Kim Metcalf	Field Hockey/Softball
Ohio State	1990	Joe Staysniak	Football	Joan Pero	Track & Field
Ohio State	1990	Mike Racanelli	Gymnastics		
Purdue	1990	Stephen Scheffler	Basketball	Lori Overturf	Cross Country/Track & Field
Wisconsin	1990	John Byce	Hockey	Susan Temple	Volleyball
Michigan	1990	Brent Lang	Swimming & Diving	Jenny Allard	Softball
Michigan State	1990	Walter Bartels	Hockey	Eileen Shea	Basketball
Illinois	1991	Aaron Mobarak	Track & Field	Lynn Devers	Gymnastics
Indiana	1991	Scott Boatman	Football	Joy Jordan	Volleyball
Iowa	1991	David Brown	Track & Field	Janet Moylan	Volleyball
Minnesota	1991	Marty Morgan	Wrestling	Rachel Lewis	Track & Field
Northwestern	1991	Bob Christian	Football	Marilyn Peck	Swimming & Diving
Ohio State	1991	Michael DiSabato	Wrestling	Cheryl Perozek	Basketball
Purdue	1991	Dave Barrett	Basketball/Baseball	Joy Holmes	Basketball
Wisconsin	1991	Jack Waite	Tennis	Elaine Demetroulis	Tennis
Michigan	1991	Mike Barrowman	Swimming & Diving	Stacy Berg	Tennis
Michigan State	1991	Walter Bartels	Hockey	Emily Coatney	Soccer
Illinois	1992	Mike Hopkins	Football	Katie Riley	Basketball
Indiana	1992	Mark Hagen	Football	Katrin Koch	Track & Field
Iowa	1992	Paul Bautel	Gymnastics	Jennifer Brower	Cross Country/Track & Field
Minnesota	1992	Scott Tripps	Swimming & Diving	Uta Herrmann	Swimming & Diving
Northwestern	1992	Matt Case	Wrestling	Michele Savage	Basketball
Ohio State	1992	Paul Huzyak	Track & Field	Stacia Goff	Swimming & Diving
Purdue	1992	Craig Riley	Basketball	MaChelle Joseph	Basketball
Wisconsin	1992	Matt Demaray	Wrestling	Heather Taggart	Soccer
Michigan	1992	Eric Bailey	Swimming & Diving	Amy Bannister	Track & Field
Michigan State	1992	Stuart Hirschman	Baseball	Misty Allison	Cross Country/Track & Field
Penn State	1992	Gregory B. Guarton	Lacrosse	Michele R. Robinson	Volleyball
Illinois	1993	Brad Lawton	Track & Field	Lindsey Nimmo	Tennis
Indiana	1993	David Held	Tennis	Courtney Cox	Basketball/Golf
Iowa	1993	Matt Whitaker	Football	Andrea Wieland	Field Hockey
Minnesota	1993	John Roethlisberger	Gymnastics	Laura Herman	Swimming & Diving
Northwestern	1993	Mark Loretta	Baseball	Nancy Kennelly	Basketball
Ohio State	1993	Jim Knopp	Gymnastics	Erika Cottrell	Swimming & Diving
Purdue	1993	Brian Daly	Swimming & Diving	Heidi Reynolds	Swimming & Diving
Wisconsin	1993	Donovan Bergstrom	Track & Field	Kim Sherman	Cross Country/Track & Field
Michigan	1993	Robert Pelinka	Basketball	Mindy Gehrs	Swimming & Diving
Michigan State	1993	Dave Smith	Cross Country/Track & Field	Ruth Aguayo	Gymnastics
Penn State	1993	Vitali Nazlymov	Fencing	Jenny Kretchmar	Basketball
Illinois	1994	Forry Wells	Football/Baseball	Tonya Booker	Basketball
Indiana	1994	Vito Maurici	Wrestling	Anne Eastman	Volleyball
Iowa	1994	Kevin Herd	Cross Country/Track & Field	Tina Stec	Cross Country/Track & Field
Minnesota	1994	Martin Eriksson	Track & Field	Carol Ann Shudick	Basketball
Northwestern	1994	Kevin Rankin	Basketball	Susan Donahoe	Swimming & Diving
Ohio State	1994	Mike Repasky	Baseball	Holly Humphrey	Swimming & Diving
Purdue	1994	Ron Gabrisko	Baseball	Kim Fritsch	Swimming & Diving
Wisconsin	1994	Louis Hinshaw	Track & Field	Susie Holt	Soccer
Michigan	1994	Tobin Van Pelt	Track & Field	Molly McClimon	Cross Country
Michigan State	1994	Steve Wasylk	Football	Laura Bell	Cross Country/Track & Field
Penn State	1994	Craig Fayak	Football	Helen Holloway	Basketball
Illinois	1995	Steve Marianetti	Wrestling	Carmel Corbett	Track & Field
Indiana	1995	Erik Barrett	Tennis	Michelle Venturella	Softball
Iowa	1995	Bryan Crowley	Tennis	Laura Dvorak	Tennis
Minnesota	1995	Brian Yee	Gymnastics	Kara Martin	Swimming & Diving
Northwestern	1995	Ron Rojas	Baseball	Gretchen Scheuermann	Field Hockey
Ohio State	1995	Joey Galloway	Football	Katie Hedman	Softball
Purdue	1995	Jon Pergande	Track & Field	Cindy Lamping	Basketball
Purdue	1995			Katy Koonz	Track & Field
Wisconsin	1995	Jeff Gold	Soccer	Dana Tzakis	Golf
Michigan	1995	Todd Collins	Football	Beth Wymer	Gymnastics
Michigan State	1995	Emilio Collins	Wrestling	Laura Bell	Cross Country/Track & Field
Penn State	1995	John Amaechi	Basketball	Jill Pearsall	Field Hockey
Illinois	1996	Marko Koers	Track & Field	Dawn Riley	Track & Field
Indiana	1996	John Hammerstein	Football	Gina Ugo	Softball
Iowa	1996	Jay Thornton	Gymnastics	Kim Baker	Gymnastics
Minnesota	1996	Bernie Zeruhn	Swimming & Diving	Lori Townsend	Track & Field
Northwestern	1996	Rohan Gardner	Wrestling	Betsy Vance	Field Hockey
Ohio State	1996	Andy Gerken	Swimming & Diving	Katie Smith	Basketball
Ohio State	1996	Adam Spitznagel	Volleyball		
Purdue	1996	Chris Kessick	Baseball	Corissa Yasen	Basketball
Wisconsin	1996	Scott Lamphear	Soccer	Lauren Gavaris	Tennis
Michigan	1996	Jay Riemersma	Football	Monika Black	Track & Field
Michigan State	1996	Brian Picklo	Wrestling	Patti Raduenz	Softball
Penn State	1996	Jeff Hartings	Football	Olga Kalinovskaya	Fencing
Illinois	1997	Seth Brady	Wrestling	Kelly Scherr	Volleyball
Indiana	1997	Tom Lukawski	Football	Mary Vajgrt	Golf
Iowa	1997	Peter Masucci	Gymnastics	Jennifer (McMahon) Strong	Softball
Iowa	1997	Andre Woolridge	Basketball		
Minnesota	1997	Matt Schlessman	Swimming & Diving	Katrien DeDecker	Volleyball
Northwestern	1997	Pat Fitzgerald	Football	Michele Ratay	Basketball
Ohio State	1997	Greg Bellisari	Football	Gina Pietras	Synchronized Swimming & Diving
Purdue	1997	Matt Brown	Swimming & Diving	Jannon Roland	Basketball
Wisconsin	1997	Alastair Steel	Soccer	Kathy Butler	Cross Country/Track & Field
Michigan	1997	Jason Botterill	Hockey	Shareen Luze	Volleyball
Michigan State	1997	Tyler Harlton	Hockey	Sevatheda Fynes	Track & Field
Michigan State	1997			Val Sterk	Volleyball
Penn State	1997	Mac Fraser	Swimming & Diving	Becky Gusic	Track & Field
Illinois	1998	Eric Siebert	Wrestling	Ashley Berggren	Basketball
Indiana	1998	Robert Iglinski	Swimming & Diving	Jennifer Gray	Golf
Iowa	1998	Jeff McGinness	Wrestling	Anne West	Rowing
Minnesota	1998	Brandon Paulson	Wrestling	Jennifer McElmury	Soccer
Northwestern	1998	Brian Musso	Football	Joy Stover	Swimming & Diving
Ohio State	1998	Marko Strahija	Swimming & Diving	Sharon E. Wong	Swimming & Diving
Purdue	1998	Chad Austin	Basketball	Marisa Watts	Swimming & Diving
Wisconsin	1998	Erik Raygor	Hockey	Katie Voigt	Basketball
Michigan	1998	Kevin Sullivan	Cross Country	Kim Johnson	Swimming & Diving
Michigan State	1998	Tyler Harlton	Hockey	Melissa Pryor	Field Hockey
Penn State	1998	Joseph M. Roemer	Gymnastics	Kimberly L. McGreevy	Cross Country
Illinois	1999	Bobby True	Track & Field	Stacey Schapiro	Tennis
Indiana	1999	Bryan Holcomb	Cross Country/Track & Field	Melissa Rooney	Volleyball
Iowa	1999	Derek Rose	Football	Anne West	Rowing
Minnesota	1999	Tim Hartung	Wrestling	Shannon Beeler	Softball
Northwestern	1999	Evan Eschmeyer	Basketball	Megan Chawansky	Basketball
Ohio State	1999	Jason Trott	Baseball	Becky Borchers	Soccer
Purdue	1999	Vilmos Kovaca	Swimming & Diving	Stephanie White-McCarty	Basketball
Wisconsin	1999	Brian Doherty	Soccer	Shannon Brown	Soccer
Michigan	1999	Jon Jansen	Football	Beth Amelkovich	Gymnastics
Michigan State	1999	Steve Schell	Cross Country/Track & Field	Carrie Carpenter	Softball
Penn State	1999	Mike Griesser	Tennis	Lesley Spada	Swimming & Diving
Illinois	2000	Travis Romagnoli	Gymnastics	Tara Mendozza	Track & Field/Cross Country
Indiana	2000	Matt Snyder	Football	Jessica Anderson	Tennis
Iowa	2000	Stetson Steele	Cross Country/Track & Field	Shera Wiegler	Tennis
Minnesota	2000	Brandon Eggum	Wrestling	Terri Jashinsky	Swimming & Diving
Northwestern	2000	Scott Schatzman	Wrestling	Courtney Allen	Swimming & Diving
Ohio State	2000	Angel Aja	Volleyball	Laura Murray	Pistol
Purdue	2000	Brian Cardinal	Basketball	Carrie Long	Track & Field
Wisconsin	2000	Jay Schoenfelder	Cross Country/Track & Field	Gina Panighetti	Swimming & Diving
Michigan	2000	Rob Renes	Football	Elizabeth Kampfe	Cross Country
Michigan State	2000	Shawn Horcoff	Hockey	Carly Weiden	Swimming & Diving
Penn State	2000	Dan Schall	Volleyball	Tasha Kulka	Swimming & Diving
Illinois	2001	Graydon Oliver	Tennis	Betsy Spicer	Volleyball
Indiana	2001	Ian Arons	Tennis	Jennifer Hsia	Tennis
Iowa	2001	Kevin Agnew	Gymnastics	Katie Garrels	Rowing
Minnesota	2001	Ben Hamilton	Football	Aubrey Schmitt	Track & Field
Northwestern	2001	Luke Donald	Golf	Colleen Cheng	Tennis
Ohio State	2001	Jamie Natalie	Gymnastics	Fane Groes	Fencing
Purdue	2001	Drew Brees	Football	Camille Cooper	Basketball
Wisconsin	2001	Mike Kelley	Basketball	Allie Blomquist	Golf
Michigan	2001	Chris Thompson	Swimming & Diving	Kacy Beitel	Soccer
Michigan State	2001	Shawn Mason	Football	Carly Weiden	Swimming & Diving
Penn State	2001	Omar J. Bhutta	Fencing	Beth Buchheit	Cross Country/Track & Field
Illinois	2002	John Lockhart	Wrestling	Gia Lewis	Track & Field
Indiana	2002	Colin Rogers	Soccer	Molly Fonner	Water Polo
Iowa	2002	Aaron Kampman	Football	Lindsey Meder	Basketball
Minnesota	2002	Owen Elzen	Wrestling	Lindsey Berg	Volleyball
Northwestern	2002	Zak Kustok	Football	Merritt Adams	Swimming & Diving
Ohio State	2002	Kevin Stephan	Lacrosse	Allison Blanton	Field Hockey
Purdue	2002	Travis Dorsch	Football	Kelly Komara	Basketball
Wisconsin	2002	Danny Westerman	Tennis	Andrea Wanezek	Swimming & Diving
Michigan	2002	Justin Toman	Gymnastics	Katie Jazwinski	Track & Field
Michigan State	2002	Josh Thornhill	Football	Carly Weiden	Swimming & Diving
Michigan State	2002			Krista Buzzell	Rowing
Penn State	2002	Andy Latowski	Golf	Katie Anderson	Swimming & Diving
Illinois	2003	Andy Schutzenhofer	Baseball	Michelle Webb	Tennis
Indiana	2003	Kyle Hornsby	Basketball	Kristin Stanford	Water Polo
Iowa	2003	Andrew Lightfoot	Football	Kristin Johnson	Softball
Minnesota	2003	Jared Lawrence	Wrestling	Shani Marks	Track & Field
Northwestern	2003	Kellan O’Connor	Swimming & Diving	Rachel Evjen	Cross Country
Northwestern	2003			Cristelle Grier	Tennis
Ohio State	2003	Vincent Ng	Tennis	Victoria Bowen	Synchronized Swimming & Diving
Purdue	2003	Gene Mruczkowski	Football	Lindsay Lange	Swimming & Diving
Wisconsin	2003	Kirk Penney	Basketball	Erin Byrd	Volleyball
Michigan	2003	Jeff Hopwood	Swimming & Diving	Janessa Grieco	Gymnastics
Michigan State	2003	Tyler Robinson	Soccer	Stephanie Anisko	Swimming & Diving
Penn State	2003	Martin Schierhorn	Swimming & Diving	Emily Oleksiuk	Soccer
Illinois	2004	Phil Stolt	Tennis	Jennifer McGaffigan	Tennis
Indiana	2004	Chris Powers	Track & Field	Audrey Giesler	Cross Country/Track & Field
Iowa	2004	Nate Kaeding	Football	Jennie Lillis	Basketball
Minnesota	2004	Adam Steele	Track & Field	Cassie Busse	Volleyball
Northwestern	2004	Tony Swanson	Swimming & Diving	Jessica Rush	Tennis
Ohio State	2004	Ben Hartsock	Football	Jessica Marshall	Pistol
Purdue	2004	John Standeford	Football	Shereka Wright	Basketball
Wisconsin	2004	Ryan Tremelling	Track & Field	Morgan Shields	Volleyball
Michigan	2004	Pat Owen	Wrestling	Melissa Bickett	Track & Field
Michigan State	2004	Steve Manz	Track & Field	Michelle Carson	Cross Country/Track & Field
Penn State	2004	Clint Keithley	Tennis	Katie Futcher	Golf
Illinois	2005	Jack Ingram	Basketball	Cynthya Goulet	Tennis
Indiana	2005	Danny O'Rourke	Soccer	Jessica Gall	Cross Country/Track & Field
Iowa	2005	Sean Considine	Football	Jennifer Skolaski	Swimming & Diving
Minnesota	2005	Guillermo Alvarez	Gymnastics	Lindsey Taatjes	Volleyball
Northwestern	2005	Luis Castillo	Football	Courtney Koester	Lacrosse
Ohio State	2005	Mitchell Richeson	Swimming & Diving	Kristen White	Golf
Purdue	2005	Louis Paul	Swimming & Diving	Andrea Hillsey	Softball
Wisconsin	2005	Jim Leonhard	Football	Carla MacLeod	Ice Hockey
Michigan	2005	Ryan Bertin	Wrestling	Lindsey Gallo	Track & Field
Michigan State	2005	Chris Hill	Basketball	Veerle Goudswaard	Field Hockey
Penn State	2005	Jerker Taudien	Gymnastics	Joanna Lohman	Soccer
Illinois	2006	Dee Brown	Basketball	Christen Karniski	Soccer
Indiana	2006	Clint Crosier	Baseball	Courtney O’Bryan	Soccer
Iowa	2006	Greg Brunner	Basketball	Nancilea Underwood	Swimming & Diving
Minnesota	2006	Greg Eslinger	Football	Laura Johnson	Gymnastics
Northwestern	2006	Brett Basanez	Football	Lindsey Munday	Lacrosse
Ohio State	2006	Jason Rogers	Fencing	Keturah Lofton	Track & Field
Purdue	2006	Giordan Pogioli	Swimming & Diving	Carrie McCambridge	Swimming & Diving
Wisconsin	2006	Nathan Brown	Track & Field	Jessica Ring	Soccer
Michigan	2006	Davis Tarwater	Water Polo/Swimming & Diving	Grace Luetele	Softball
Michigan State	2006	Drew Stanton	Football	Liz Shimek	Basketball
Penn State	2006	Matt Proper	Volleyball	Sarah Haupt	Swimming & Diving
Illinois	2007	Warren Carter	Basketball	Yvonne Mensah	Track & Field
Indiana	2007	Will Meyers	Football	Stacey Clausing	Track & Field
Iowa	2007	Adam Haluska	Basketball	Heather Schnepf	Field Hockey
Minnesota	2007	Matt Spaeth	Football	Emily Brown	Cross Country/Track & Field
Northwestern	2007	Chris Wilson	Golf	Alexis Prousis	Tennis
Ohio State	2007	Kellen Harkness	Swimming & Diving	Saskia Mueller	Field Hockey
Purdue	2007	Mike Otto	Football	Katie Gearlds	Basketball
Wisconsin	2007	Joe Thomas	Football	Sara Bauer	Ice Hockey
Michigan	2007	Jeff Porter	Track & Field	Katie Erdman	Track & Field
Michigan State	2007	Drew Stanton	Football	Kristen Coleman	Gymnastics
Penn State	2007	Daniel Kaiserian	Swimming & Diving	Stephanie Sullivan	Gymnastics
Illinois	2008	Jeremy Leman	Football	Mary Therese McDonnell	Soccer
Indiana	2008	Thomas Richter	Tennis	Haley Exner	Field Hockey
Iowa	2008	Mike Klinkenborg	Football	Meghan Armstrong	Cross Country/Track & Field
Minnesota	2008	C.P. Schlatter	Wrestling	Liz Podominick	Track & Field
Northwestern	2008	David Roth	Soccer	Christy Finch	Lacrosse
Ohio State	2008	Daniel Mathews	Volleyball	Jenna Griffin	Track & Field
Purdue	2008	Jared Armstrong	Football	Shauna Stapleton	Soccer
Wisconsin	2008	Adam Barhamand	Rowing	Katrina Rundhaug	Track & Field/Cross Country
Michigan	2008	Matko Maravic	Tennis	Lindsey Cottrell	Soccer
Michigan State	2008	Drew Neitzel	Basketball	Kate Burdick	Rowing
Penn State	2008	Conrad Taylor	Soccer	Molly Crispell	Swimming & Diving
Illinois	2009	Trent Meacham	Basketball	Emily Zurrer	Soccer
Indiana	2009	Austin Starr	Football	Whitney Thomas	Basketball
Iowa	2009	Eric MacTaggart	Track & Field	Lauren Pfeiffer	Field Hockey
Minnesota	2009	Matthew Nohelty	Baseball	Jenny Shaughnessy	Swimming & Diving
Northwestern	2009	Eric Peterman	Football	Samantha Nemecek	Fencing
Ohio State	2009	Brian Robiskie	Football	Linda Haussener	Field Hockey
Purdue	2009	Jake Patacsil	Wrestling	Kara Patterson	Track & Field
Wisconsin	2009	Joe Krabbenhoft	Basketball	Gwen Jorgensen	Track & Field
Michigan	2009	Steve Luke	Wrestling	Tiffany Ofili	Track & Field
Michigan State	2009	Doug DeMartin	Soccer	Sarah Schmidt	Rowing
Penn State	2009	James Pagana	Track & Field	Zoe Bouchelle	Soccer
Illinois	2010	Jon Asamoah	Football	Angela Bizzarri	Track & Field/Cross Country
Indiana	2010	Ofori Sarkodie	Soccer	Wendi Robinson	Track & Field
Iowa	2010	Brent Metcalf	Wrestling	Tricia Dean	Field Hockey
Minnesota	2010	Jayson Ness	Wrestling	Heather Dorniden	Track & Field
Northwestern	2010	Mark Blades	Soccer	Lauren Lui	Tennis
Ohio State	2010	Stefan Sigrist	Swimming & Diving	Chelsea Davis	Swimming & Diving
Purdue	2010	Chris Kramer	Basketball	FahKara Malone	Basketball
Wisconsin	2010	Jack Bolas	Track & Field	Chavon Robinson	Track & Field
Michigan	2010	Phillip Goldberg	Gymnastics	Angela Findlay	Softball
Michigan State	2010	Blair White	Football	Allyssa DeHaan	Basketball
Penn State	2010	Jason Yeisley	Soccer	Ashley Griffith	Softball
Illinois	2011	Scott Langley	Golf	Hillary Haen	Volleyball
Indiana	2011	Ben Chappell	Football	Vera Neuenswander	Track & Field
Iowa	2011	Julian Vandervelde	Football	Bethany Praska	Track & Field
Minnesota	2011	Mike Thorn	Wrestling	Kaylee Jamison	Swimming & Diving
Northwestern	2011	Matt Eliason	Soccer	Maria Mosolova	Tennis
Ohio State	2011	Steven Kehoe	Volleyball	Cassie Dickerson	Soccer
Purdue	2011	Kyle Adams	Football	Allie Smith	Swimming & Diving
Wisconsin	2011	Gabe Carimi	Football	Maggie Meyer	Swimming & Diving
Michigan	2011	Carl Hagelin	Hockey	Sarah Curtis	Gymnastics
Michigan State	2011	Brandon Eckerle	Baseball	Aimee Neff	Golf
Penn State	2011	Stefen Wisniewski	Football	Jessica Babcock	Track & Field
Illinois	2012	Luke Guthrie	Golf	Jenna Carosio	Soccer
Indiana	2012	Matt Roth	Basketball	Margaux Farrell	Swimming & Diving
Iowa	2012	Erik Sowinski	Track & Field	McKenzie Melander	Cross Country
Minnesota	2012	David Pachuta	Track & Field	Anne Schleper	Ice Hockey
Northwestern	2012	Francis Brooke	Baseball	Chelsea Armstrong	Field Hockey
Ohio State	2012	Andrew Elliott	Swimming & Diving	Bianca Alvarez	Swimming & Diving
Purdue	2012	Robbie Hummel	Basketball	Brittany Rayburn	Basketball
Wisconsin	2012	Peter Konz	Football	Laurie Nosbusch	Soccer
Michigan	2012	Dan Madwed	Swimming & Diving	Amanda Chidester	Softball
Michigan State	2012	Kirk Cousins	Football	Jenilee Rathje	Volleyball
Penn State	2012	Miguel Pineda	Gymnastics	Erin Thomas	Swimming & Diving
Nebraska	2012	Tyler Hitchler	Track & Field	Ashley Miller	Track & Field
Illinois	2013	Brandon Paul	Basketball	Alina Weinstein	Gymnastics
Indiana	2013	Luis Soffner	Soccer	Amy Cozad	Swimming & Diving
Iowa	2013	Javier Balboa	Gymnastics	Morgan Johnson	Basketball
Minnesota	2013	Quentin Mege	Track & Field	Noora Räty	Ice Hockey
Northwestern	2013	Luke Farrell	Baseball	Gabriella Flibotte	Lacrosse
Ohio State	2013	Max Stearns	Fencing	Alicia Herron	Softball
Purdue	2013	Robert Maci	Football	Ariel Turner	Volleyball
Wisconsin	2013	Elliot Krause	Cross Country/Track & Field	Kendall Schmidt	Rowing
Michigan	2013	Jack Greenlee	Track & Field	Katie Zurales	Gymnastics
Michigan State	2013	Jacob Jarzen	Swimming & Diving	Caroline Powers	Golf
Penn State	2013	John Urschel	Football	Petra Januskova	Tennis
Nebraska	2013	Bjorn Barrefors	Track & Field	Mary Weatherholt	Tennis
Illinois	2014	Nathan Scheelhaase	Football	Vanessa DiBernardo	Soccer
Indiana	2014	Ryan LeBlanc	Wrestling	Meghan Lappan	Water Polo
Iowa	2014	James Morris	Football	Marike Stribos	Field Hockey
Michigan	2014	John Wojciechowski	Swimming & Diving	Jillian Smith	Cross Country/Track & Field
Michigan State	2014	Greg Wolfe	Ice Hockey	Kristen Henn	Field Hockey
Minnesota	2014	Derek Toomey	Swimming & Diving	Sara Moulton	Softball
Nebraska	2014	Seth Wiedel	Track & Field	Emily Wong	Gymnastics
Northwestern	2014	Raleigh Smith	Tennis	Marisa Bast	Softball
Ohio State	2014	Aaron Craft	Basketball	Allison Elber	Rowing
Penn State	2014	Adrian Evans	Gymnastics	Emily Giannotti	Track & Field
Purdue	2014	Matt Friede	Swimming & Diving	Casey Matthews	Swimming & Diving
Wisconsin	2014	Reed Connor	Track & Field	Mary Massei	Softball
Illinois	2015	Will Krug	Baseball	Liz McMahon	Volleyball
Indiana	2015	Mark Murphy	Football	Rebecca Gerrity	Water Polo
Iowa	2015	Kevin Lewis	Cross Country/Track & Field	Samantha Logic	Basketball
Maryland	2015	Varun Ram	Basketball	Malina Howard	Basketball
Michigan	2015	Justin Glanda	Swimming & Diving	Nicole Elmblad	Basketball
Michigan State	2015	Mike Sadler	Football	Abby Barker	Field Hockey
Minnesota	2015	Kyle Rau	Ice Hockey	Jessica Plant	Swimming & Diving
Nebraska	2015	John Welk	Track & Field	Jessie DeZiel	Gymnastics
Northwestern	2015	Brandon Vitabile	Football	Maddy Carpenter	Field Hockey
Ohio State	2015	Kevin Metka	Tennis	Katie Borchers	Cross Country
Penn State	2015	Matt Brown	Wrestling	Nia Grant	Volleyball
Purdue	2015	MacKenzie Tweardy	Swimming & Diving	Jamie Bissett	Swimming & Diving
Rutgers	2015	David Milewski	Football	Betnijah Laney	Basketball
Wisconsin	2015	Drew teDuits	Swimming & Diving	Kimberly Dinh	Golf
Illinois	2016	Charlie Danielson	Golf	Allie Bauch	Softball
Indiana	2016	Nick Zeisloft	Basketball	Nicole Volgraf	Field Hockey
Iowa	2016	Mike Gesell	Basketball	Katie Brown	Rowing
Maryland	2016	Michl McCarney	Lacrosse	Rachelle Beanlands	Soccer
Michigan	2016	Mason Ferlic	Track & Field	Shannon Scavelli	Field Hockey
Michigan State	2016	Jack Allen	Football	Lisa Burt	Gymnastics
Minnesota	2016	Aaron Bartnik	Cross Country/Track & Field	Hannah Brandt	Hockey
Nebraska	2016	Shavon Shields	Basketball	Mattie Fowler	Softball
Northwestern	2016	Joey Calistri	Soccer	Lisa McCarthy	Field Hockey
Ohio State	2016	Jacoby Boren	Football	Catherine Shields	Rowing
Penn State	2016	Nico Megaludis	Wrestling	Britt Eckerstrom	Soccer
Purdue	2016	Matthew McClintock	Cross Country/Track & Field	Katie Hoevet	Cross Country/Track & Field
Rutgers	2016	Corey Crawford	Track & Field	Brianne Reed	Soccer
Wisconsin	2016	Joel Stave	Football	Kelsey Card	Track & Field
Illinois	2017	Joe Spencer	Football	Nicole Evans	Softball
Indiana	2017	Derek Creviston	Soccer	CaraMia Tsirigos	Softball
Iowa	2017	Alex Meyer	Wrestling	Ally Disterhoft	Basketball
Maryland	2017	Cody Niedermeier	Soccer	Zoe Stukenberg	Lacrosse
Michigan	2017	Jake Butt	Football	Nicole Artz	Gymnastics
Michigan State	2017	Josiah Price	Football	Alexis Wiersma	Cross Country/Track & Field
Minnesota	2017	Luca Wieland	Track & Field	Lee Stecklein	Hockey
Nebraska	2017	Drew Wiseman	Track & Field	Tierra Williams	Track & Field
Northwestern	2017	Austin Carr	Football	Nandi Mehta	Soccer
Ohio State	2017	Christy Blough	Volleyball	Emma Baranski	Synchronized Swimming
Penn State	2017	David Goodwin	Hockey	Abby Smucker	Lacrosse
Purdue	2017	Jake Replogle	Football	August Kim	Golf
Rutgers	2017	Ken Theobold	Wrestling	Alyssa Bull	Field Hockey
Wisconsin	2017	Connor Medbery	Wrestling	Lauren Carlini	Volleyball
Illinois	2018	Isaiah Martinez	Wrestling	Nicole Choquette	Cross Country/Track & Field
Indiana	2018	Laren Eustace	Baseball	Tyra Buss	Basketball
Iowa	2018	Kevin Docherty	Cross Country/Track & Field	Zoe Douglas	Tennis
Maryland	2018	Alex Leto	Track & Field	Kristen Confroy	Basketball
Michigan	2018	PJ Ransford	Swimming & Diving	Erin Finn	Cross Country/Track & Field
Michigan State	2018	Jimmy Fiscus	Soccer	Katelyn Daniels	Track & Field
Minnesota	2018	Derek Wiebke	Cross Country/Track & Field	Carlie Wagner	Basketball
Nebraska	2018	Chris Stephenson	Gymnastics	Danielle Breen	Gymnastics
Northwestern	2018	Justin Jackson	Football	Hannah Kim	Golf
Ohio State	2018	Kyle Snyder	Wrestling	Kelsey Mitchell	Basketball
Penn State	2018	Zain Retherford	Wrestling	Haleigh Washington	Volleyball
Purdue	2018	Marat Amaltdinov	Swimming & Diving	Ashley Evans	Volleyball
Rutgers	2018	Michael Rexrode	Lacrosse	Casey Murphy	Soccer
Wisconsin	2018	Josh McDonald	Track & Field	Georgia Ellenwood	Track & Field
Illinois	2019	Nick Allegretti	Football	Ali Bastianelli	Volleyball
Indiana	2019	Juwan Morgan	Basketball	Jessica Parratto	Swimming & Diving
Iowa	2019	Matt Nelson	Football	Megan Gustafson	Basketball
Maryland	2019	Jahi Jones	Wrestling	Abigail Bentz	Volleyball
Michigan	2019	Robbie Mertz	Soccer	Siobhán Haughey	Swimming & Diving
Michigan State	2019	Khari Willis	Football	Jessica Ling	Gymnastics
Minnesota	2019	Justin Karstadt	Gymnastics	Temi Ogunrinde	Track & Field
Nebraska	2019	Anton Stephenson	Gymnastics	Mikaela Foecke	Volleyball
Northwestern	2019	Ryan Lumsden	Golf	Yvonne Chart	Fencing
Ohio State	2019	Mason Jobst	Ice Hockey	Karrington Winters	Track & Field
Penn State	2019	Jason Nolf	Wrestling	Ally McHugh	Swimming & Diving
Purdue	2019	David Blough	Football	Taite Kitchel	Swimming & Diving
Rutgers	2019	Anthony Ashnault	Wrestling	Sarah Johanek	Rowing
Wisconsin	2019	D’Cota Dixon	Football	Annie Pankowski	Ice Hockey
Illinois	2020	Michael Paradise	Gymnastics	Taylor Edwards	Basketball/Softball
Indiana	2020	Jake Kleimola	Wrestling	Emily Powell	Water Polo
Iowa	2020	Nate Stanley	Football	Hannah Greenlee	Rowing
Maryland	2020	Jared Bernhardt	Lacrosse	Kaila Charles	Basketball
Michigan	2020	Thomas Cope	Swimming & Diving	Guadalupe Fernández Lacort	Field hockey
Michigan State	2020	Cassius Winston	Basketball	Gabriella Douglas	Gymnastics
Minnesota	2020	Carter Coughlin	Football	Ivy Lu	Gymnastics
Nebraska	2020	Luke Siedhoff	Track & Field	Sierra Hassel	Gymnastics
Northwestern	2020	Jared Thomas	Football	Kirsten Mansfield	Field Hockey
Ohio State	2020	Kollin Moore	Wrestling	Jincy Roese	Ice Hockey
Penn State	2020	Stephen Nedoroscik	Gymnastics	Kaleigh Riehl	Soccer
Purdue	2020	Jaret Carpenter	Cross Country/Track & Field	Janae’ Moffitt	Track & Field
Rutgers	2020	Jordan Pagano	Wrestling	Amanda Visco	Soccer
Wisconsin	2020	Zach Lorbeck	Track & Field	Beata Nelson	Swimming & Diving
Illinois	2021	Mike Carr	Wrestling	Tristyn Nowlin	Golf
Indiana	2021	Ethan Shepherd	Golf	Hanna Németh	Soccer
Iowa	2021	Spencer Lee	Wrestling	Anthe Nijziel	Field hockey
Maryland	2021	Roman Puglise	Lacrosse	Grace Griffin	Lacrosse
Michigan	2021	Adam Shibley	Football	Alice Hill	Cross country/Track & field
Michigan State	2021	Bryce Kelley	Baseball	Amanda Ling	Swimming & Diving
Minnesota	2021	Jack LaFontaine	Hockey	Sarah Bacon	Swimming & Diving
Nebraska	2021	Evan Hymanson	Gymnastics	Abigail Knapton	Swimming & Diving
Northwestern	2021	Ryan Deakin	Wrestling	Lindsey Pulliam	Basketball
Ohio State	2021	Ryan Terefenko	Lacrosse	Sade Olatoye	Track & Field
Penn State	2021	Pierre Reedy	Soccer	Kerry Abello	Soccer
Purdue	2021	Brandon Loschiavo	Swimming & Diving	Emily Bretscher	Swimming & Diving
Rutgers	2021	Kieran Mullins	Lacrosse	Gianna Glatz	Field hockey
Wisconsin	2021	Linus Weissbach	Ice hockey	Sydney Hilley	Volleyball
Illinois	2022	Blake Hayes	Football	Megan Cooney	Volleyball
Indiana	2022	Ben Veatch	Cross country/Track & field	Kristen Hayden	Swimming & Diving
Iowa	2022	Tyler Linderbaum	Football	Manuela Lizarazu	Golf
Maryland	2022	Logan Wisnauskas	Lacrosse	Brooke DeBerdine	Field hockey
Michigan	2022	Nick Blankenburg	Ice hockey	Arielle Weissman	Lacrosse
Michigan State	2022	Morgan Beadlescomb	Cross country/Track & field	Lea Mitchell	Gymnastics
Minnesota	2022	Gable Steveson	Wrestling	Bethany Hasz	Cross country/Track & field
Nebraska	2022	Dylan LeClair	Gymnastics	Andy Jacobs	Track & Field
Northwestern	2022	Steven Forman	Tennis	Veronica Burton	Basketball
Ohio State	2022	Tyler Johnson	Track & Field	Izzy Rodriguez	Soccer
Penn State	2022	John Harrar	Basketball	Jonni Parker	Volleyball
Purdue	2022	Benjamin Bramley	Swimming & Diving	Grace Cleveland	Volleyball
Rutgers	2022	Geo Baker	Basketball	Taralyn Naslonski	Lacrosse
Wisconsin	2022	Brad Davison	Basketball	Lauren Barnes	Volleyball
Illinois	2023	Adrien Dumont de Chassart	Golf	Mia Takekawa	Gymnastics
Indiana	2023	Andrew Capobianco	Swimming & Diving	Noelle Peplowski	Swimming & Diving
Iowa	2023	Spencer Lee	Wrestling	Monika Czinano	Basketball
Maryland	2023	Nick Lorusso	Baseball	Diamond Miller	Basketball
Michigan	2023	Kevin Buca	Soccer	Sierra Brooks	Gymnastics
Michigan State	2023	Cameron Caffey	Wrestling	Abby Gardiner	Soccer
Minnesota	2023	John Michael Schmitz	Football	Taylor Heise	Ice Hockey
Nebraska	2023	Trent Hixson	Football	Ieva Turke	Track & Field
Northwestern	2023	David Nyfjäll	Golf	Kayla Blas	Field hockey
Ohio State	2023	Kaleb Romero	Wrestling	Sophie Jaques	Ice Hockey
Penn State	2023	Sean Clifford	Football	Lexie Black	Softball
Purdue	2023	Parker Filius	Wrestling	Maycey Vieta	Swimming & Diving
Rutgers	2023	Adam Korsak	Football	Hannah Joyner	Gymnastics
Wisconsin	2023	Trent Hillger	Wrestling	Kayla Konwent	Softball
Illinois	2024	Isaiah Williams	Football	Kendall Bostic	Basketball
Indiana	2024	Joey Maher	Soccer	Anne Fowler	Swimming & Diving
Iowa	2024	Gratt Reed	Track & Field	Sam Cary	Soccer
Maryland	2024	Ajax Zappitello	Lacrosse	Emily Sterling	Lacrosse
Michigan	2024	Blake Corum	Football	Gabby Wilson	Gymnastics
Michigan State	2024	Jack Frank	Baseball	Justina Gaynor	Soccer
Minnesota	2024	Isaiah Salazar	Wrestling	Gianna Gerdes	Gymnastics
Nebraska	2024	Ethan Piper	Football	Billie Andrews	Softball
Northwestern	2024	Boo Buie	Basketball	Izzy Scane	Lacrosse
Ohio State	2024	Lyle Yost	Swimming & Diving	Amy Fulmer	Swimming & Diving
Penn State	2024	TJ Malone	Lacrosse	Cori Dyke	Soccer
Purdue	2024	Mason Gillis	Basketball	Maddie Schermerhorn	Volleyball
Rutgers	2024	Shane Knobloch	Lacrosse	Cassidy Spilis	Lacrosse
Wisconsin	2024	Cameron Huss	Golf	Emma Jaskaniec	Soccer
Illinois	2025	Jackson Buchanan	Golf	Raina Terry	Volleyball
Indiana	2025	Jassen Yep	Swimming & Diving	Brianna Copeland	Softball
Iowa	2025	Payton Sandfort	Basketball	Maggie Johnston	Soccer
Maryland	2025	Jaxon Smith	Wrestling	Emma DeBerdine	Field Hockey
Michigan	2025	Paul Juda	Gymnastics	Julia Fliegner	Tennis
Michigan State	2025	Jaden Akins	Basketball	Gabrielle Stephen	Gymnastics
Minnesota	2025	Dawson Garcia	Basketball	Mya Hooten	Gymnastics
Nebraska	2025	Micaylon Moore	Track & Field	Lexi Rodriguez	Volleyball
Northwestern	2025	Brooks Barnhizer	Basketball	Maddie Zimmer	Field hockey
Ohio State	2025	Cody Simon	Football	Makenna Webster	Field Hockey/Ice Hockey
Oregon	2025	Bryce Boettcher	Football	Paige Sinicki	Softball
Penn State	2025	Tyler Warren	Football	Maddie Gordon	Softball
Purdue	2025	Cameron Miller	Track & Field	Sophie McAfee	Swimming & Diving
Rutgers	2025	Kyle Monangai	Football	Chloe Timberg	Track & Field
UCLA	2025	Pablo Ereño	Golf	Lilly Reale	Soccer
USC	2025	Caden Aoki	Basketball	Gala Trubint	Volleyball
Washington	2025	Carson Bruener	Football	Dalayah Daniels	Basketball
Wisconsin	2025	Bob Liking	Cross Country/Track & Field	Phoebe Bacon	Swimming & Diving
Illinois	2026	Kenta Miyoshi	Tennis	McKenna Schaefbauer	Tennis
Indiana	2026	Trelee Banks	Track & Field	Shay Ciezki	Basketball
Iowa	2026	Will Ryan	Cross Country/Track & Field	Ava Bayless	Wrestling
Maryland	2026	Will Schaller	Lacrosse	Kori Edmondson	Lacrosse
Michigan	2026	Josh Eernisse	Ice Hockey	Abigail Tamer	Field Hockey
Michigan State	2026	Ozan Baris	Tennis	Nikki Smith	Gymnastics
Minnesota	2026	Derik LeCaptain	Basketball	Amaya Battle	Basketball
Nebraska	2026	Asher Cohen	Gymnastics	Axelina Johansson	Track & Field
Northwestern	2026	Nick Martinelli	Basketball	Madison Taylor	Lacrosse
Ohio State	2026	Bruce Thornton	Basketball	Lena Hentschel	Swimming & Diving
Oregon	2026	Matthew Erickson	Cross Country/Track & Field	Anna Simmons	Lacrosse
Penn State	2026	Levi Haines	Wrestling	Tessa Janecke	Ice Hockey
Purdue	2026	Trey Kaufman-Renn	Basketball	Daryn Wright	Swimming & Diving
Rutgers	2026	Athan Kaliakmanis	Football	Charlee Crawford	Track & Field
UCLA	2026	Chase Dodd	Water Polo	Lauren Betts	Basketball
USC	2026	Dillon Klein	Volleyball	Maribel Flores	Soccer
Washington	2026	Jonah Coleman	Football	Lucy Newlin	Soccer
Wisconsin	2026	Ben Dexheimer	Ice Hockey	Caroline Harvey	Ice Hockey
