= Francis X. Cretzmeyer =

American athletic coach (1913-2001)

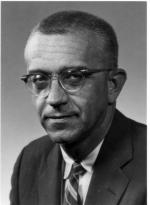
Francis X. Cretzmeyer, 1951

Francis Xavier Cretzmeyer, Jr. (January 7, 1913 – April 2, 2001) was the greatest track and field coach at the University of Iowa in the 20th century, leading their team the Hawkeyes to multiple Big Ten team titles. Before being a coach, he was a superb track and field athlete, but prevented from claiming individual titles by having the misfortune of being a contemporary of the legendary Jesse Owens, which meant that Cretzmeyer regularly came in second to Owens at Big Ten track meets.

== Early years ==
He was born January 7, 1913, in Emmetsburg, Iowa, the son of Francis Xavier Cretzmeyer, Sr., an Iowa physician. He also had an uncle who was a physician in Algona. Cretzmeyer's father had played baseball for three years for the Iowa Hawkeyes before graduating in 1905, but Francis Jr. was expected to follow in the family tradition and become a doctor.

In 1938, he married Marian Cornwall, with whom he had five children: Mary Fran (married to John Niemeyer), Catherine, Margaret, Francis Xavier III , and John. Cretzmeyer was well-known and liked in Iowa City social circles, and counted among his friends both Don Ameche and his son Ron, owner of the "Ameche's Pumpernickel" restaurant.

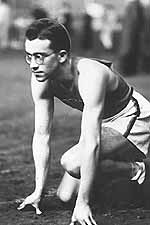
1934. Cretzmeyer was known as "the runner with glasses"

== Athlete ==
Cretzmeyer excelled in several track and field events, including long jump, high jump, and javelin, representing his school from 1934 until 1936, the year that he both graduated and was also an alternate for the Berlin Summer Olympics, in the hurdles event (the actual team was world recordholder Forrest Towns, who won gold, and Fritz Pollard, Jr., who won bronze).

As an individual athlete, Cretzmeyer never won an individual Big Ten title, but set school records for "points scored in a season" (144½), and also had a career record (355) that is still standing (as of 1993). His 220-meter hurdles were twice listed in the annual "best in the world" lists, but most often he found himself competing against the legendary Jesse Owens, which kept him off of the winner lists.

== Coach ==
His first coaching job was in Harrisburg, Illinois, in 1938, where he was the hand-picked choice to succeed Drake basketball star Bucky O'Connor. Two years later, he went on to Des Moines North, taking over for seven years as a swimming coach from Jack McGuire, and also as a track coach, helping teams to take three state cross-country titles, before switching to work as track coach for a year at Grinnell College.

In 1948, he took over as the head men's cross country coach at the University of Iowa, a job which he held for 30 years. He coached the Hawkeyes to their first ever Big Ten Cross Country team titles in 1963 and 1967, and championed the cause that African-American athletes could excel at more than just running short sprints. He coached seven NCAA Champions (six track, one cross country), 22 all-Americans (18 track, four cross country) and 146 Big Ten Champions (140 track, six cross country).

Some of the individual athletes who he coached included:

Ira James Murchison
Gold medal in the men's 4x100 meter relay, 1956 Summer Olympics in Melbourne, Australia.

Ted Wheeler
(1952–53, 1956) Competed in the 1,500 meters at the 1956 Olympics, was all-American in 800 meters (1952) and 1,500 meters (1956). Four-time Big Ten champion, winning both the 880 yards and mile at the 1956 Big Ten indoor and outdoor meets.

Deacon Jones
(1954–58) Competed in 3,000-meter steeplechase at 1956 Olympics in Melbourne, and 1960 games in Rome NCAA Champion and all-American in two miles (1957). First African-American to win NCAA cross country title (1955), eight-time Big Ten Champion, winning indoor mile and two-mile runs twice (1957–58), outdoor mile twice (1957–58), outdoor two-mile run once (1957) and cross country (1958). He still holds the school record in the 3,000-meter steeplechase.

Rich Ferguson
(1952–55) NCAA Champion and All-American in two miles (1953), two-time Big Ten Champion in outdoor two-mile run (1952–53)

== Retirement ==
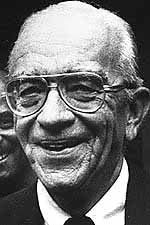
c.1984

Cretzmeyer retired from University of Iowa coaching in 1977, having been declared Hawkeye men's "Coach of the Year" twice in his career.

He was a member of the Iowa Track Coaches Association, and in 1978, served as president of the United States Track Coaches Association.

Cretzmeyer died on April 2, 2001, in Iowa City, at the age of 88. The eulogy at his memorial was given by Larry Wieczorek, the current track coach at the University of Iowa.

== Awards ==
- 1935, Finnish AAC
- 1936, Big Ten Medal of Honor (combined excellence in athletics and academics)
- 1986, inducted into the Drake Relays Coaches Hall of Fame.
- 1993, inducted into the Des Moines Register Iowa Sports Hall of Fame.
- Iowa Track Coaches Association Hall of Fame

== Writing ==
- Bresnahan and Tuttle's Track and Field Athletics, 1969, Western Periodicals, California (co-author with Louis E. Alley and Charles M. Tipton) - Multiple editions, and the book has been translated into multiple languages
- Track and field athletics, 1974, 8th edition, Saint Louis: Mosby

== Memorials ==
- The "Francis X. Cretzmeyer" Olympic-sized track at the University of Iowa was completed in 1986. It cost $2 million, and has hosted the 1987 and 2000 Big Ten championships, as well as the annual Iowa Musco Twilight Invitation.
- The Cretzmeyer-Keatinge Scholarship
