= Steven Kehoe =

American volleyball player

Steven Kehoe, Jr. (born October 20, 1987), is an American former volleyball player who played professionally in Finland and Belgium.

== Early life and education ==
Kehoe was born on October 20, 1987. His father played volleyball for the Ball State Cardinals and his mother played volleyball for the Western Michigan Broncos; both later coached.

Kehoe played volleyball at St. Xavier High School in Cincinnati, winning a state championship in 2006. At Ohio State University, he won the 2011 NCAA men's volleyball tournament and the 2011 Big Ten Medal of Honor. He was the first volleyball player to receive the school's Male Athlete of the Year award.

== Athletic career ==
Kehoe joined the Finnish team Tampereen Isku-Volley in 2011 before playing half a season for the Belgian team VBC Waremme in 2013. He then returned to Finland, playing for the Finland Volleyball League's Kokkolan Tiikerit in the 2014 and 2015 seasons.

== Later career ==
After retiring from professional volleyball, Kehoe began a real estate company in Chicago.
