= Elmo Paul Hohman =

American economics professor (1894–1977)

Elmo Paul Hohman Professor
- Born: August 2, 1894; Salem, Illinois, US
- Died: January 1, 1977 (aged 82); Evanston, Illinois, US
- Years active: 1921–1962
- Spouse: Helen Fisher Hohman
- Children: 1

Academic background
- Education: University of Illinois Urbana-Champaign

Academic work
- Discipline: Labour History, Maritime History
- Institutions: Harvard University; Northwestern University
- Notable ideas: Maritime history

Elmo Paul Hohman (August 2, 1894 – January 1, 1977) was an American professor of economics. He wrote a number of books about merchant seafarers.

== Early life ==
He was born on August 2, 1894, in Salem, Washington County, Illinois, US. His parents were Henry Hohman (1838–1897) and Caroline née Hoffman. His father was born in Germany, came to the United States in 1860 and served in the Union Army during the Civil War. The couple had eight children, one of whom died in infancy.

== Academic career ==
The title of Hohman's Bachelor of Arts history thesis at the University of Illinois Urbana-Champaign was, The Ku Klux Klan: Its Origin, Growth, and Disbandment (1916). His Master of Arts history thesis at the same institution was, The Attitude of the Presbyterian Church in the United States Towards American Slavery (1917). He was a member of the Phi Beta Kappa society.

He was awarded the Ricardo Prize Scholarship in Economics in 1920. The following year he was appointed a tutor in economics, history and government at Harvard University. The title of his 1925 PhD thesis was The American Whaleman: A Study of the Conditions of Labor in the Whaling Industry, 1785–1885. By the time it was completed he was an assistant professor of economics (1925–31) at Northwestern University. He went on to be an associate professor (1931–1938) in the Economics Department and was made a full professor in 1938. He remained at Northwestern until he retired in 1962 after 39 years in the faculty.

He wrote a number of books. These include The American Whaleman (1928), Seamen Ashore (1952) and The History of American Merchant Seamen (1956). He also wrote articles for academic journals such as the Journal of the American Statistical Association, the Journal of Political Economy and the International Labour Review.

== Other activities ==
He was a Big Ten Medal of Honor winner in track and field at the University of Illinois in 1916. The medal was awarded to one student in the graduating class of each of the 14 institutions of the Big Ten Conference who had "attained the greatest proficiency in athletics and scholastic work".

While still a student, he undertook military training at Camp Grant (Illinois) in 1918. He was appointed a second lieutenant in the infantry the same year. He served as a field director in the American Red Cross transport service in France and England in 1919.

He was a referee in the division of unemployment compensation, Illinois Department of Labor (1939–42), district price executive in the Chicago Metropolitan office of the Office of Price Administration (1942–44) and vice-chairman of the United States Maritime Commission's National War Labor Board (1944). He was involved in the V-12 Navy College Training Program (1943–46) at Northwestern to supplement the force of commissioned officers in the United States Navy during World War II. Hohman was on the war Shipping Panel (1945) and was appointed the chairman of the committee of the Yale Fund for Seamen's Studies in 1946.

He served as a visiting scholar and observer at the International Labor Office on four occasions between 1928 and 1959. He was also a panel arbitrator in the Federal Mediation and Conciliation Service and a member of the International Labour Organization's maritime division in Geneva.

== Personal life ==
He married Helen Vastine Fisher (1894–1972) at Henry, Illinois, on August 16, 1919. She too became an economics professor and taught at Vassar, Simmons College and Northwestern. They had at least one child, a daughter.

Elmo Hohman died in Evanston, Illinois, on January 1, 1977, survived by his daughter and two grandchildren.

== Legacy ==
Hohman is mainly remembered for his books. His book, The American Whaleman, is a standard work on the subject.

== Select bibliography ==
- The American Whaleman; A Study of Life and Labor in the Whaling Industry, Longmans, Green & Co, New York, 1928
- The International Labour Organisation and the Seamen, Geneva Research Centre, Geneva, 1937
- American and Norwegian whaling; a comparative study of labor and industrial organisation, 1937
- Seaman ashore: a study of the United Seaman's Service and of merchant seamen in port, Yale University Press, New Haven, 1952
- Merchant Seaman's welfare services: a plea for international action, International Labour Office, Geneva, 1955
- History of American merchant seamen, Shoestring Press, Hamden, Conn, 1956
