= Walter Bietila =

American ski jumper

Walter Bietila (12 February 1916 – 21 March 1996) was an American ski jumper who competed in the 1936 Winter Olympics and in the 1948 Winter Olympics.
