= Keith Nosbusch =

American business executive

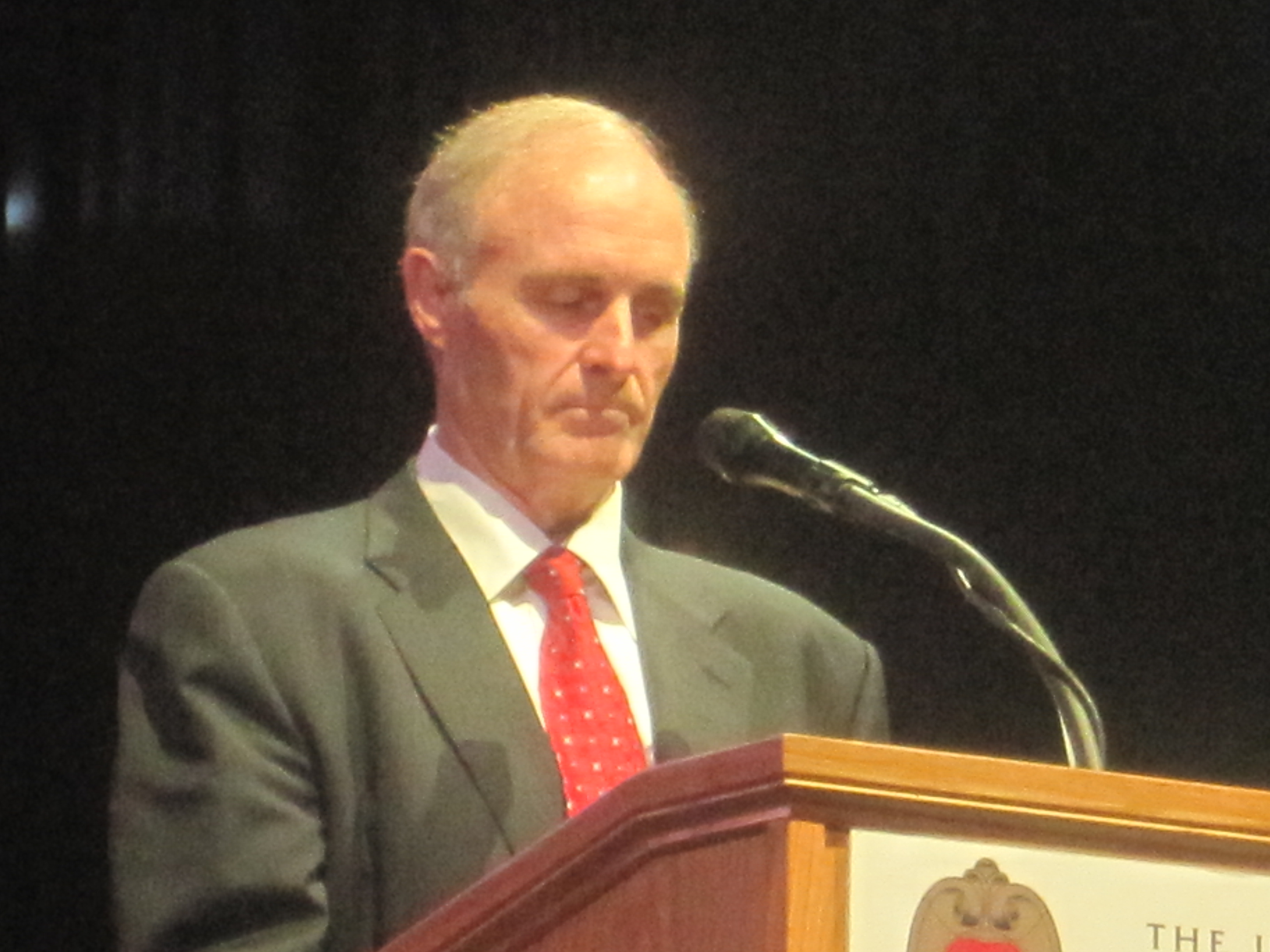
Keith Nosbusch speaking at the 2011 National Science Olympiad.

Keith Nosbusch was the chairman and CEO of Rockwell Automation Inc., one of the world largest industrial automation companies. He was appointed the company's CEO in 2004 and chairman in 2005. Before that, he worked as senior vice president and president of Rockwell Automation Control Systems.

Nosbusch is also a director of the Manitowoc Company Inc. and director or member of a number of business, civic and community organizations.

Nosbusch graduated from the University of Wisconsin–Madison with a bachelor's degree in electrical and computer engineering in 1974. He earned his master's degree in business administration from the University of Wisconsin–Milwaukee in 1976.

In April 2016, Rockwell Automation announced that Keith Nosbusch would be replaced by Blake Moret as CEO. Nosbusch would become chairman.

In 2022, Nosbusch received an honorary Doctor of Science degree from the University of Wisconsin-Madison.

== Personal ==
Nosbusch is a Milwaukee, Wisconsin native and is married to his wife Jane with 3 children: Carolyn, David and Laurie. During college, he was the UW–Madison football team captain and was awarded the Big Ten Medal of Honor for demonstrating joint athletic and academic excellence throughout his college career.
