= List of Cornell Big Red in the NFL draft =

This is a list of Cornell Big Red football players in the NFL draft.

== Key ==
| B | Back | K | Kicker | NT | Nose tackle |
| C | Center | LB | Linebacker | FB | Fullback |
| DB | Defensive back | P | Punter | HB | Halfback |
| DE | Defensive end | QB | Quarterback | WR | Wide receiver |
| DT | Defensive tackle | RB | Running back | G | Guard |
| E | End | T | Offensive tackle | TE | Tight end |

== Selections ==
| Year | Round | Pick | Overall | Player | Team | Position |
|---|---|---|---|---|---|---|
| 1939 | 10 | 4 | 84 | Bill McKeever | Philadelphia Eagles | T |
| 1939 | 11 | 3 | 93 | Sid Roth | Cleveland Rams | G |
| 1940 | 21 | 4 | 194 | Vince Eichler | Green Bay Packers | B |
| 1941 | 10 | 7 | 87 | Walter Matuszczak | New York Giants | B |
| 1941 | 11 | 4 | 94 | Nick Drahos | Cleveland Rams | T |
| 1941 | 17 | 4 | 154 | Kirk Hershey | Cleveland Rams | E |
| 1941 | 22 | 2 | 204 | Mort Landsberg | Pittsburgh Steelers | B |
| 1944 | 25 | 7 | 259 | Smokey Martin | Washington Redskins | B |
| 1944 | 30 | 2 | 309 | Howard Blose | Brooklyn Dodgers | B |
| 1945 | 22 | 4 | 223 | Walt Kretz | Boston Yanks | B |
| 1945 | 22 | 7 | 226 | Chick Davidson | Washington Redskins | T |
| 1946 | 9 | 2 | 72 | Al Dekdebrun | Boston Yanks | B |
| 1946 | 25 | 6 | 236 | Chick Davidson | Green Bay Packers | T |
| 1947 | 5 | 4 | 29 | Frank Wydo | Pittsburgh Steelers | T |
| 1949 | 8 | 10 | 81 | Bob Dean | Philadelphia Eagles | B |
| 1949 | 18 | 6 | 177 | Hillary Chollet | Los Angeles Rams | B |
| 1949 | 25 | 3 | 244 | Paul Girolamo | Boston Yanks | B |
| 1951 | 26 | 4 | 307 | Jeff Fleischmann | Chicago Cardinals | B |
| 1954 | 28 | 8 | 333 | John Gerdes | Philadelphia Eagles | T |
| 1955 | 13 | 3 | 148 | Len Oniskey | Washington Redskins | T |
| 1956 | 18 | 7 | 212 | Stan Intihar | Green Bay Packers | E |
| 1956 | 28 | 2 | 327 | Bill DeGraaf | Pittsburgh Steelers | B |
| 1964 | 8 | 11 | 109 | Gary Wood | New York Giants | QB |
| 1967 | 9 | 11 | 222 | Pete Larson | Washington Redskins | RB |
| 1969 | 10 | 23 | 257 | John Sponheimer | Kansas City Chiefs | DT |
| 1972 | 2 | 24 | 50 | Ed Marinaro | Minnesota Vikings | RB |
| 1974 | 9 | 26 | 234 | Bob Lally | Miami Dolphins | LB |
| 1974 | 14 | 22 | 360 | Mike Phillips | Cincinnati Bengals | T |
| 1984 | 9 | 24 | 248 | Derrick Harmon | San Francisco 49ers | RB |
| 1997 | 4 | 18 | 114 | Seth Payne | Jacksonville Jaguars | DT |
| 1997 | 4 | 27 | 123 | Chad Levitt | Oakland Raiders | RB |
| 2006 | 6 | 7 | 176 | Kevin Boothe | Oakland Raiders | T |
| 2013 | 4 | 24 | 122 | J. C. Tretter | Green Bay Packers | T |
| 2024 | 3 | | 94 | Jalyx Hunt | Philadelphia Eagles | LB |
| 2024 | 5 | 24 | 159 | Hunter Nourzad | Kansas City Chiefs | C |
