= Charles E. Cassidy =

American athlete and judge (1901–1972)

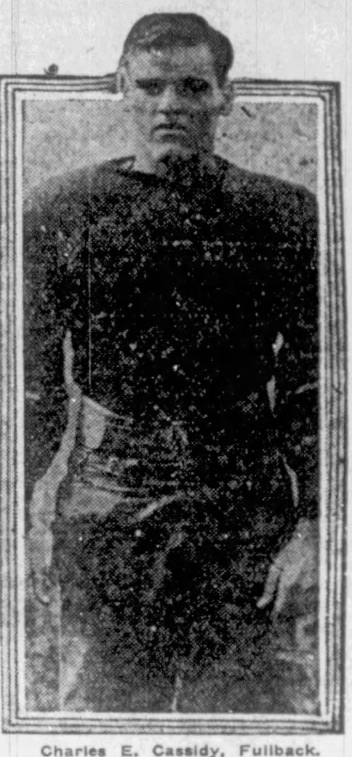
- Born: September 11, 1901
- Known for: Justice of Supreme Court of Hawaii
- Football career

Cornell Big Red
- Position: Fullback/End

Career information
- College: Cornell (1921–1923)

Awards and highlights
- 3× National champion (1921, 1922, 1923); All-American (1923); Cornell Athletics Hall of Fame

Charles E. Cassidy (September 11, 1901 – May 27, 1972) was a college football and lacrosse player for the Cornell Big Red, inducted into the Cornell Athletics Hall of Fame. After graduation, he served as Attorney General for the Territory of Hawaii and U.S. Commissioner after Hawaii became a state. He was a justice of the Hawaii Supreme Court from October 5, 1959, to May 8, 1967.

== Cornell ==
Born in San Francisco, California to John Cassidy and Eliza (Emmes) Cassidy, Cassidy attended Cornell University. He was a prominent end and fullback for the Cornell Big Red football teams of 1921, 1922, and 1923, in the backfield with George Pfann, Eddie Kaw, and Floyd Ramsey.

Cassidy received an LL.B. from Cornell University in 1925.

== Law career ==
Cassidy began his law career in New York City, moving to Hawaii in 1926 to work for the office of the United States Attorney there.

After a year, he transferred to the City and County Attorney's office, and in 1929 he went to the Attorney General's office. In 1932 he joined the staff of the Public Prosecutor's office as a Deputy and later became Public Prosecutor. He served as a Judge of the First Circuit from 1943-1947. In 1947 he entered private practice where he remained until his 1959 appointment to the Supreme Court.

== Personal life ==
On June 30, 1930, Cassidy married Helen O. Moses, a member of the 1920 United States Olympic swim team.
