= List of Cornell Big Red football seasons =

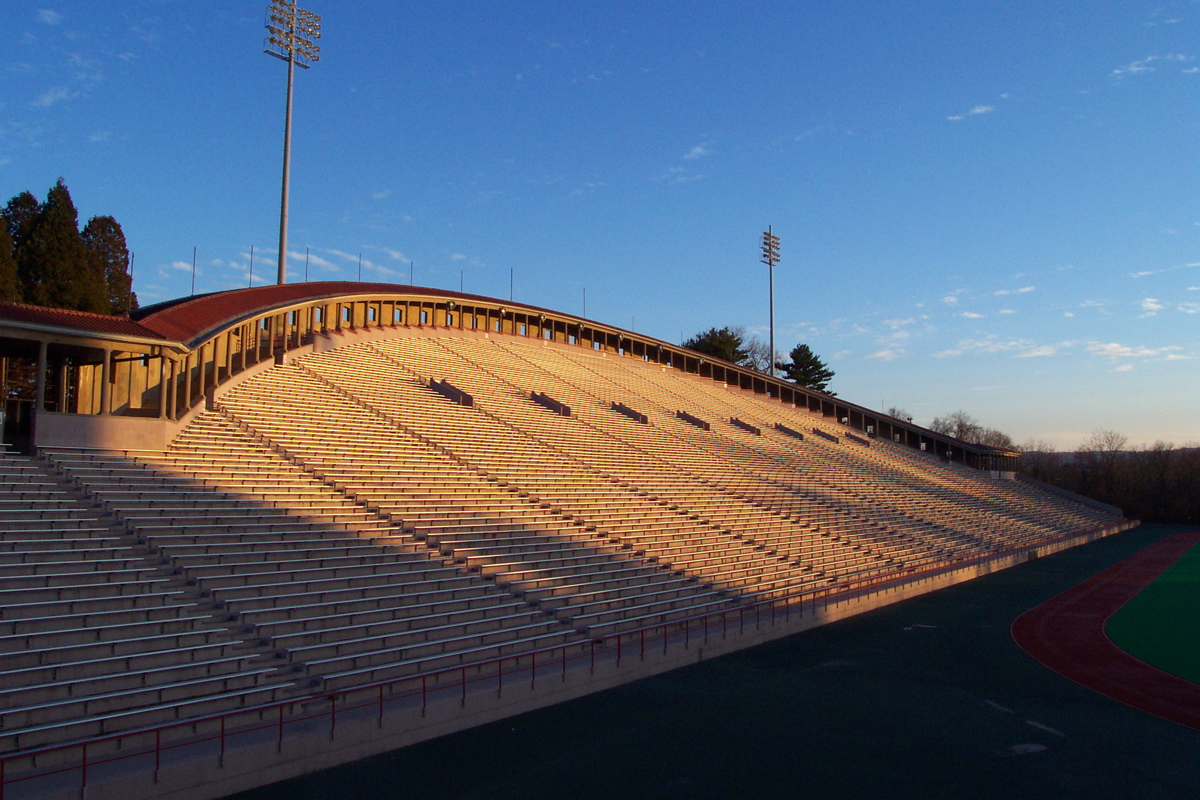
Schoellkopf Field, where the Cornell Big Red football team has played their home games since 1915

The Cornell Big Red football team represents Cornell University in the National Collegiate Athletic Association (NCAA) Division I Football Championship Subdivision (FCS) as a member of the Ivy League. In its 130 active years, the team has played in over one thousand games. The Big Red have been awarded 5 national championships, 3 Ivy League conference co-championships, and 5 times received a final ranking in the Associated Press (AP) Poll. Through the 2025 season, the Cornell Big Red have won 666, lost 568, and tied 34 regular season games.

From its first intercollegiate football game in 1887 against Union College through the 1955 season, Cornell played as an independent program before joining the newly formed Ivy League conference for the 1956 season. As members of the Ivy League, the Big Red have accumulated a conference record of 195 wins, 271 losses, and 5 ties. Since 1915, the Cornell Big Red football team have played their home games at Schoellkopf Field on Cornell's main campus in Ithaca, New York.

== Seasons ==
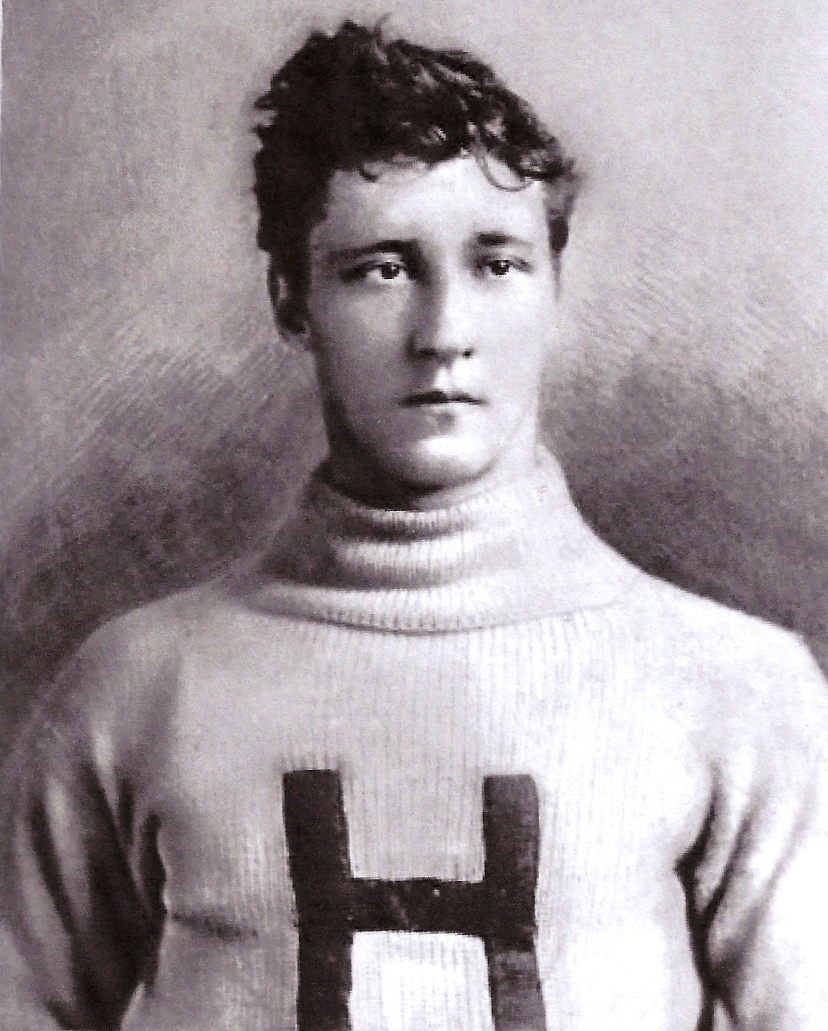
Marshall Newell, head coach from 1894 to 1985

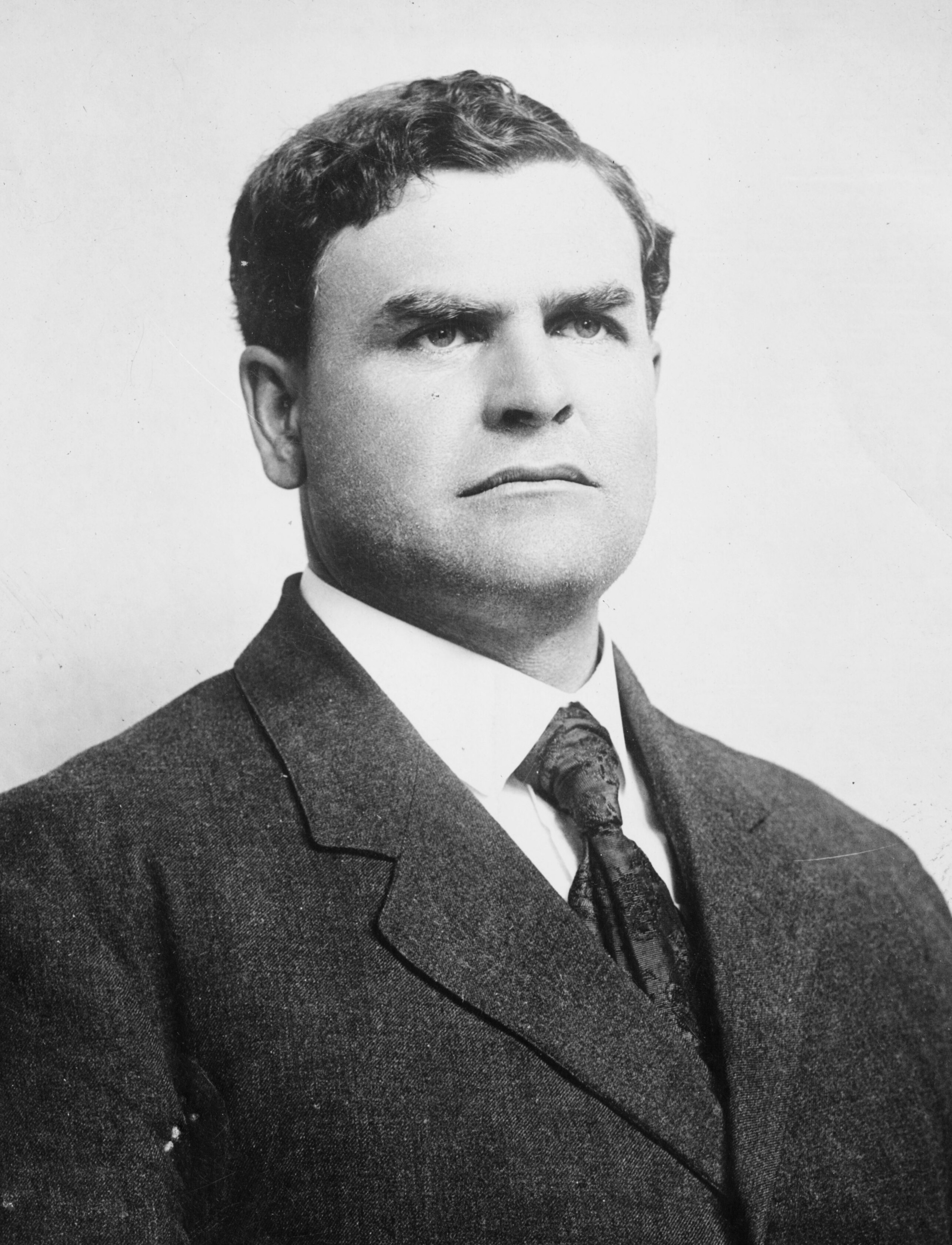
Pop Warner, head coach from 1897 to 1898 and 1904 to 1906

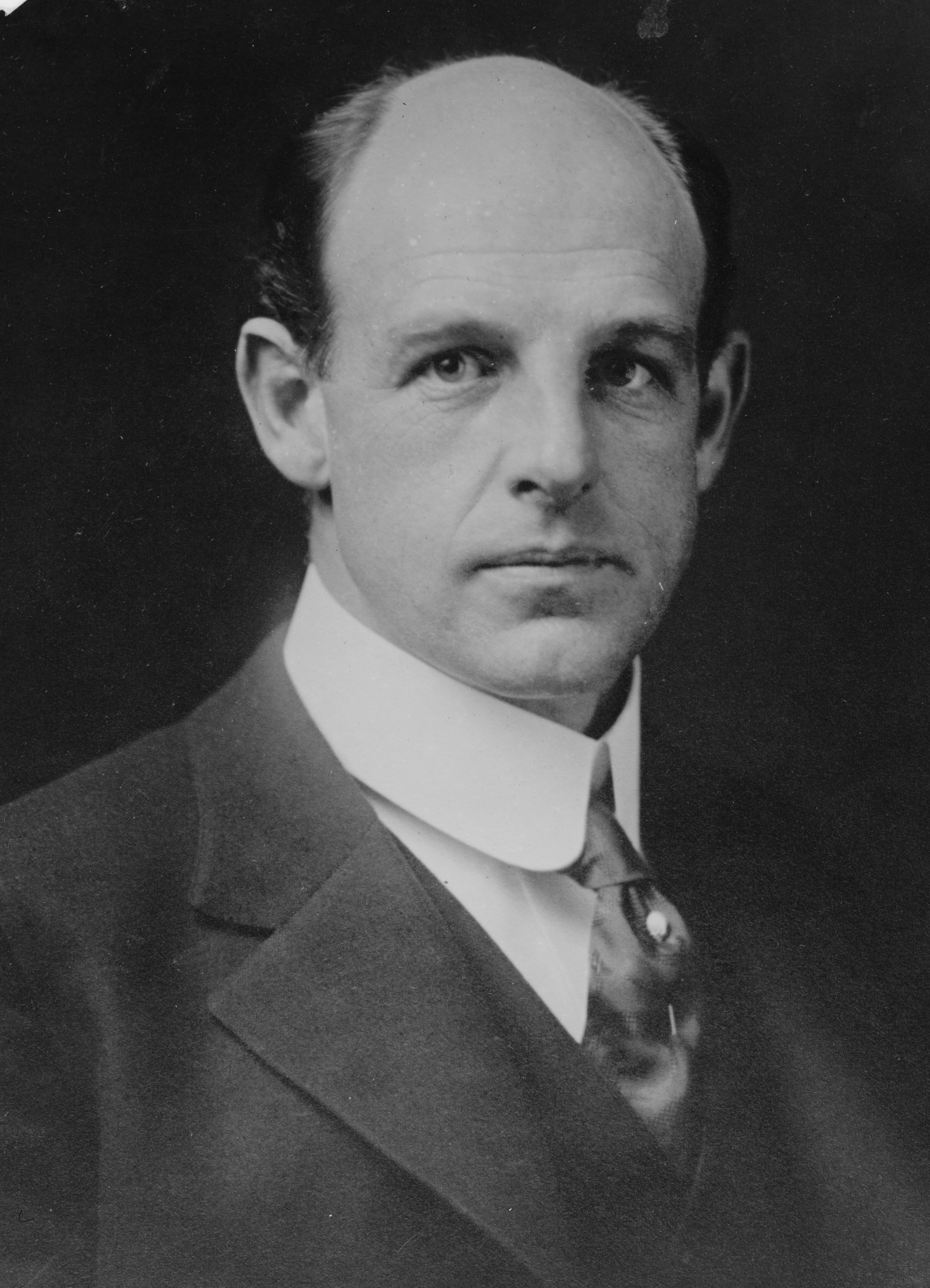
Percy Haughton, head coach from 1899 to 1900

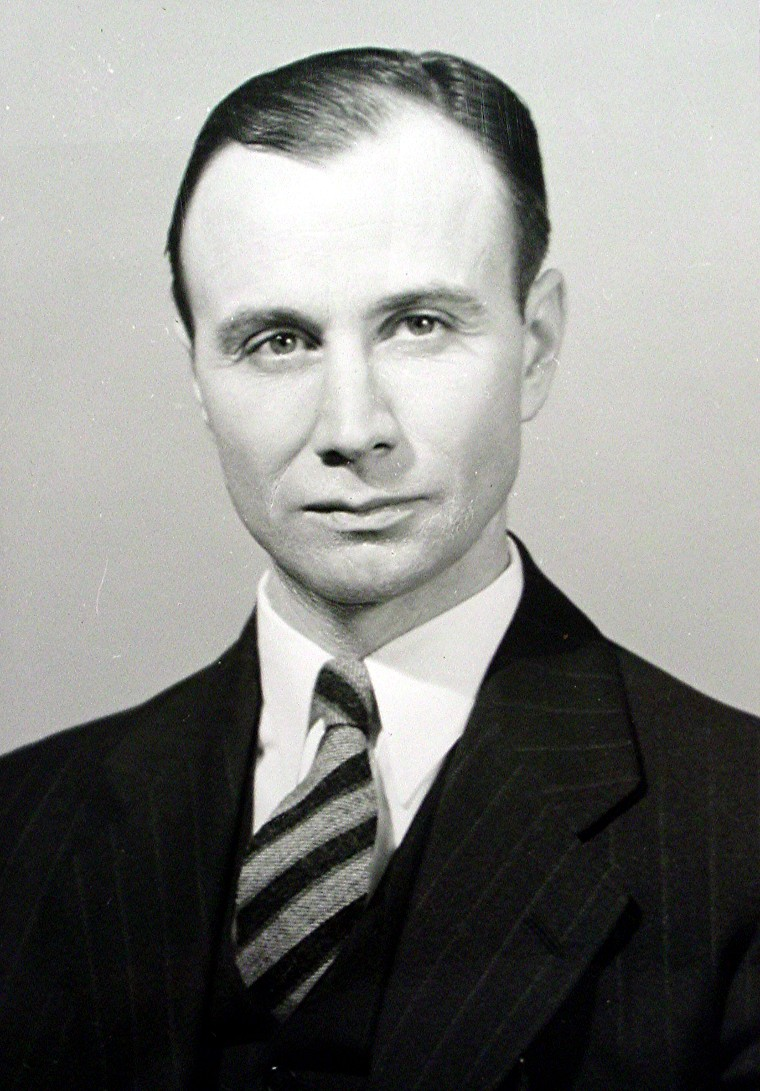
George K. James, head coach from 1947 to 1960

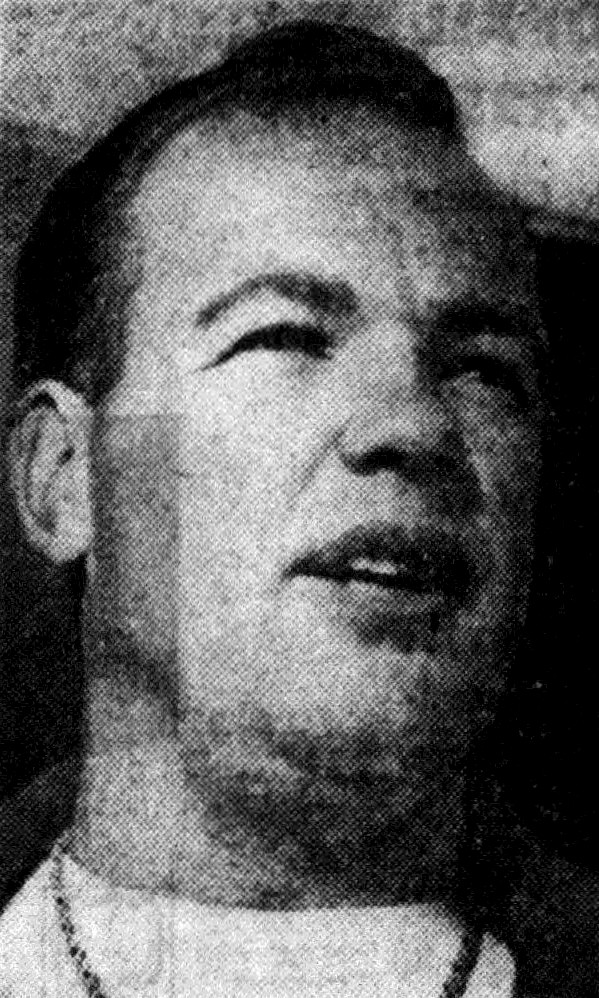
Bob Blackman, head coach from 1977 to 1982

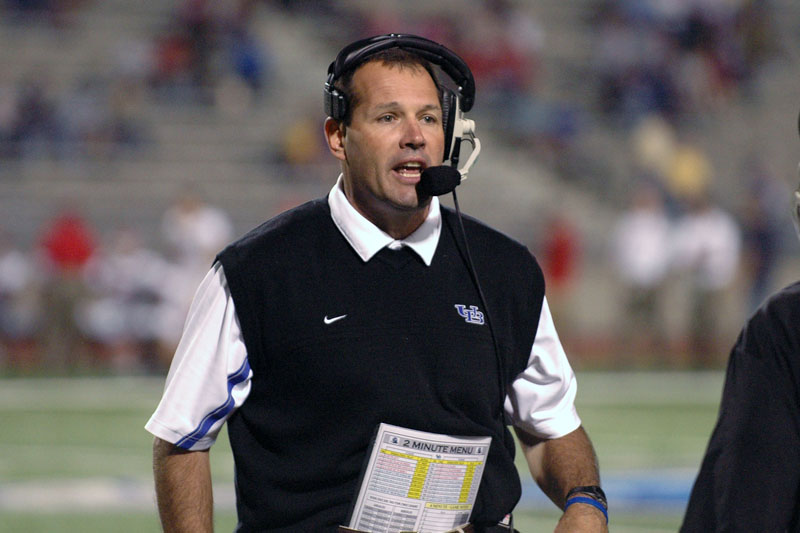
Jim Hofher, head coach from 1990 to 1997

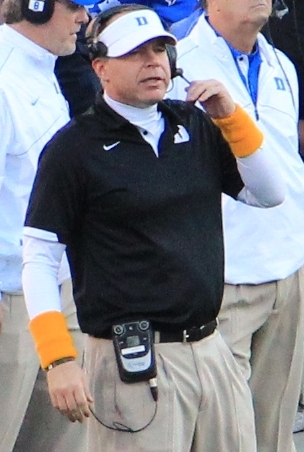
Jim Knowles, head coach from 2004 to 2009

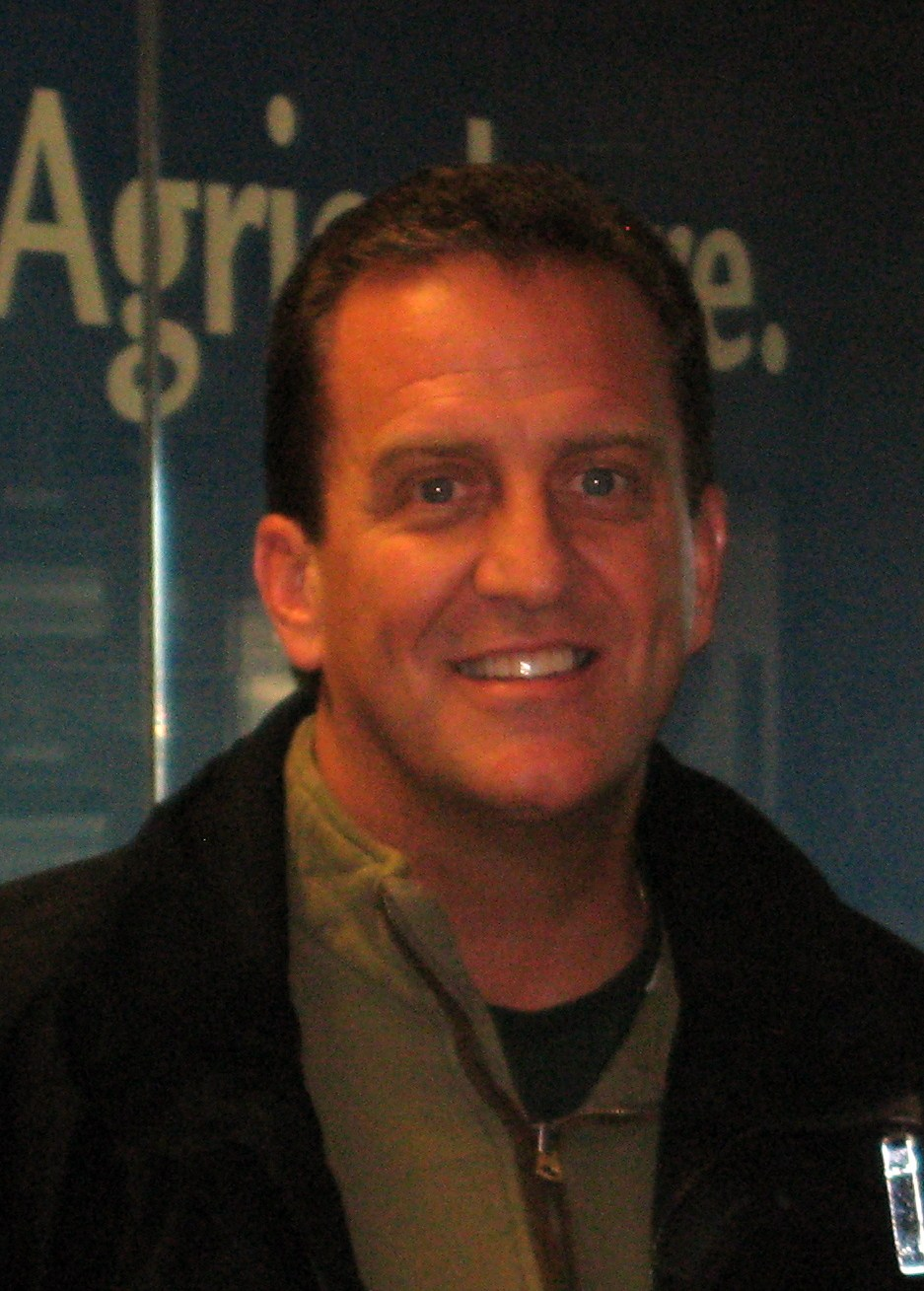
Kent Austin, head coach from 2010 to 2012

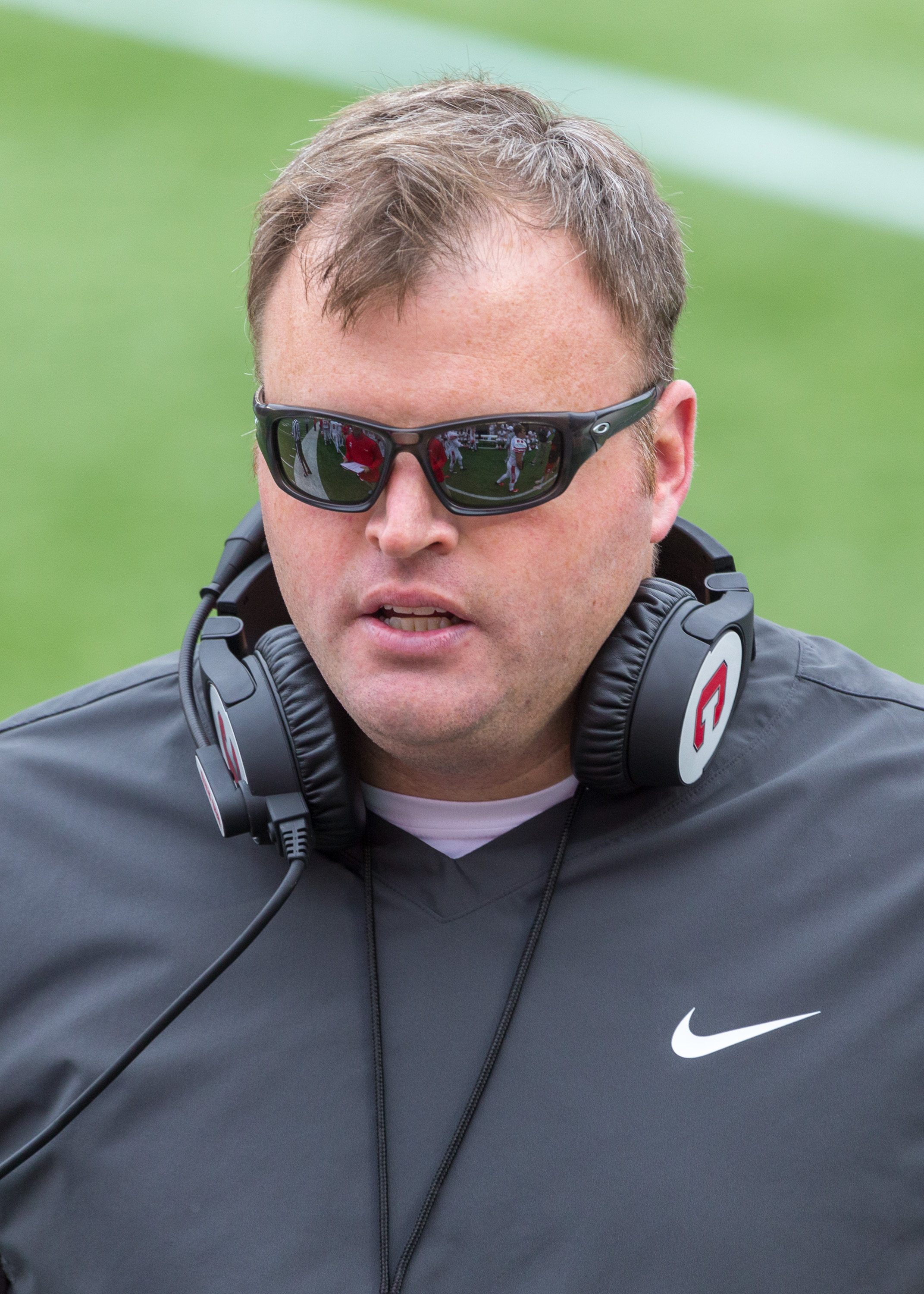
David Archer, head coach from 2013 to 2023

Year	Coach	Overall	Conference	Standing	Bowl/playoffs	Coaches^{#}	AP^{°}
Independent (1887–1893)
1887	No coach	0–2					
1888	No coach	4–2					
1889	No coach	7–2					
1890	No coach	7–4					
1891	No coach	7–3					
1892	No coach	10–1					
1893	No coach	2–5–1					
Marshall Newell (Independent) (1894–1895)
1894	Marshall Newell	6–4–1					
1895	Marshall Newell	3–4–1					
George Sanford (Independent) (1896)
1896	George Sanford	5–3–1					
Pop Warner (Independent) (1897–1898)
1897	Pop Warner	5–3–1					
1898	Pop Warner	10–2					
Percy Haughton (Independent) (1899–1900)
1899	Percy Haughton	7–3					
1900	Percy Haughton	10–2					
Raymond Starbuck (Independent) (1901–1902)
1901	Raymond Starbuck	11–1					
1902	Raymond Starbuck	8–3					
Bill Warner (Independent) (1903)
1903	Bill Warner	6–3–1					
Pop Warner (Independent) (1904–1906)
1904	Pop Warner	7–3					
1905	Pop Warner	6–4					
1906	Pop Warner	8–1–2					
Henry Schoellkopf (Independent) (1907–1908)
1907	Henry Schoellkopf	8–2					
1908	Henry Schoellkopf	7–1–1					
George Walder (Independent) (1909)
1909	George Walder	3–4–1					
Daniel A. Reed (Independent) (1910–1911)
1910	Daniel A. Reed	5–2–1					
1911	Daniel A. Reed	7–3					
Albert Sharpe (Independent) (1912–1918)
1912	Albert Sharpe	3–7					
1913	Albert Sharpe	5–4–1					
1914	Albert Sharpe	8–2					
1915	Albert Sharpe	9–0					
1916	Albert Sharpe	6–2					
1917	Albert Sharpe	3–6					
1918	No team						
John H. Rush (Independent) (1919)
1919	John H. Rush	3–5					
Gil Dobie (Independent) (1920–1935)
1920	Gil Dobie	6–2					
1921	Gil Dobie	8–0					
1922	Gil Dobie	8–0					
1923	Gil Dobie	8–0					
1924	Gil Dobie	4–4					
1925	Gil Dobie	6–2					
1926	Gil Dobie	6–1–1					
1927	Gil Dobie	3–3–2					
1928	Gil Dobie	3–3–2					
1929	Gil Dobie	6–2					
1930	Gil Dobie	6–2					
1931	Gil Dobie	7–1					
1932	Gil Dobie	5–2–1					
1933	Gil Dobie	4–3					
1934	Gil Dobie	2–5					
1935	Gil Dobie	0–6–1					
Carl Snavely (Independent) (1936–1944)
1936	Carl Snavely	3–5					
1937	Carl Snavely	5–2–1					
1938	Carl Snavely	5–1–1					12
1939	Carl Snavely	8–0					4
1940	Carl Snavely	6–2					15
1941	Carl Snavely	5–3					
1942	Carl Snavely	3–5–1					
1943	Carl Snavely	6–4					
1944	Carl Snavely	5–4					
Edward McKeever (Independent) (1945–1946)
1945	Edward McKeever	5–4					
1946	Edward McKeever	5–3–1					
George K. James (Independent) (1947–1955)
1947	George K. James	4–5					
1948	George K. James	8–1					19
1949	George K. James	8–1					12
1950	George K. James	7–2				20	
1951	George K. James	6–3					
1952	George K. James	2–7					
1953	George K. James	4–3–2					
1954	George K. James	5–4					
1955	George K. James	5–4					
George K. James (Ivy League) (1956–1960)
1956	George K. James	1–8	1–6	8th			
1957	George K. James	3–6	3–4	T–4th			
1958	George K. James	6–3	5–2	T–2nd			
1959	George K. James	5–4	3–4	T–5th			
1960	George K. James	2–7	1–6	T–7th			
Tom Harp (Ivy League) (1961–1965)
1961	Tom Harp	3–6	2–5	6th			
1962	Tom Harp	4–5	4–3	T–3rd			
1963	Tom Harp	5–4	4–3	T–4th			
1964	Tom Harp	3–5–1	3–4	T–5th			
1965	Tom Harp	4–3–2	3–3–1	4th			
Jack Musick (Ivy League) (1966–1974)
1966	Jack Musick	6–3	4–3	4th			
1967	Jack Musick	6–2–1	4–2–1	3rd			
1968	Jack Musick	3–6	1–6	7th			
1969	Jack Musick	4–5	4–3	4th			
1970	Jack Musick	6–3	4–3	4th			
1971	Jack Musick	8–1	6–1	T–1st			
1972	Jack Musick	6–3	4–3	T–3rd			
1973	Jack Musick	3–5–1	2–5	6th			
1974	Jack Musick	3–5–1	1–5–1	7th			
George Seifert (Ivy League) (1975–1976)
1975	George Seifert	1–8	0–7	8th			
1976	George Seifert	2–7	2–5	T–5th			
Bob Blackman (Ivy League) (1977–1982)
1977	Bob Blackman	1–8	1–6	T–7th			
1978	Bob Blackman	5–3–1	3–3–1	4th			
1979	Bob Blackman	5–4	4–3	T–4th			
1980	Bob Blackman	5–5	5–2	2nd			
1981	Bob Blackman	3–7	2–5	T–5th			
1982	Bob Blackman	4–6	3–4	T–4th			
Maxie Baughan (Ivy League) (1983–1988)
1983	Maxie Baughan	3–6–1	3–3–1	5th			
1984	Maxie Baughan	2–7	2–5	T–6th			
1985	Maxie Baughan	3–7	2–5	7th			
1986	Maxie Baughan	8–2	6–1	2nd			
1987	Maxie Baughan	5–5	4–3	T–4th			
1988	Maxie Baughan	7–2–1	6–1	T–1st			
Jack Fouts (Ivy League) (1989)
1989	Jack Fouts	4–6	2–5	T–5th			
Jim Hofher (Ivy League) (1990–1997)
1990	Jim Hofher	7–3	6–1	T–1st			
1991	Jim Hofher	5–5	4–3	T–4th			
1992	Jim Hofher	7–3	4–3	4th			
1993	Jim Hofher	4–6	3–4	T–4th			
1994	Jim Hofher	6–4	3–4	T–4th			
1995	Jim Hofher	6–4	5–2	T–2nd			
1996	Jim Hofher	4–6	4–3	T–3rd			
1997	Jim Hofher	5–5 (Note: Penn forfeited a conference win over Cornell due to the use of ineligible players, leading to an official record of 6–4 (4–3).)	3–4	T–4th			
Pete Mangurian (Ivy League) (1998–2000)
1998	Pete Mangurian	4–6	1–6	T–7th			
1999	Pete Mangurian	7–3	5–2	3rd			
2000	Pete Mangurian	5–5	5–2	2nd			
Tim Pendergast (Ivy League) (2001–2003)
2001	Tim Pendergast	2–7	2–5	6th			
2002	Tim Pendergast	4–6	3–4	5th			
2003	Tim Pendergast	1–9	0–7	8th			
Jim Knowles (Ivy League) (2004–2009)
2004	Jim Knowles	4–6	4–3	3rd			
2005	Jim Knowles	6–4	4–3	T–4th			
2006	Jim Knowles	5–5	3–4	T–4th			
2007	Jim Knowles	5–5	2–5	7th			
2008	Jim Knowles	4–6	2–5	T–6th			
2009	Jim Knowles	2–8	1–6	8th			
Kent Austin (Ivy League) (2010–2012)
2010	Kent Austin	2–8	1–6	7th			
2011	Kent Austin	5–5	3–4	6th			
2012	Kent Austin	4–6	2–5	T–6th			
David Archer (Ivy League) (2013–2023)
2013	David Archer	3–7	2–5	7th			
2014	David Archer	1–9	1–6	7th			
2015	David Archer	1–9	1–6	T–7th			
2016	David Archer	4–6	2–5	T–6th			
2017	David Archer	3–7	3–4	T–5th			
2018	David Archer	3–7	2–5	7th			
2019	David Archer	4–6	3–4	T–4th			
2020	No team (Note: Cornell did not compete during the 2020 season as a result of the COVID-19 pandemic and the subsequent cancellation of the Ivy League season.)						
2021	David Archer	2–8	1–6	T-6th			
2022	David Archer	5–5	2–5	T–6th			
2023	David Archer	3–7	2–5	7th			
Dan Swanstrom (Ivy League) (2024–present)
2024	Dan Swanstrom	4–6	3–4	5th			
2025	Dan Swanstrom	4–6	3–4	5th			
Total:		666–568–34					
National championship Conference title Conference division title or championship game berth
^{†}Indicates Bowl Coalition, Bowl Alliance, BCS, or CFP / New Years' Six bowl.; ^{#}Rankings from final Coaches Poll.

== See also ==
- List of Ivy League football standings
