= Floyd Ramsey =

American football player (1902–1957)

- Born: 1902
- Died: February 22, 1957; Auburn, New York, U.S.
- Occupation: executive with the Columbian Rope Co.
- Football career

Profile
- Position: Halfback

Career information
- College: Cornell (1921–1923)

Awards and highlights
- 3× National champion (1921, 1922, 1923); Cornell Athletics Hall of Fame

Floyd Daniel Ramsey (1902 – February 22, 1957) was a college football player and later executive with the Columbian Rope Company, residing in Auburn, New York. He was a halfback for the Cornell Big Red beside Eddie Kaw on the undefeated football teams of 1921, 1922 and 1923.
