= Leonard C. Hanson =

American football player, coach, and wrestler (1900–1969)

Leonard Hanson
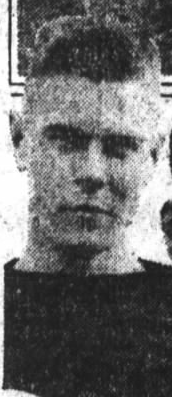
- Hanson c. 1921

Biographical details
- Born: March 29, 1900; Veblen, South Dakota, U.S.
- Died: October 1969 (aged 69)

Playing career
- 1921–1922: Cornell
- Position: Tackle/Kicker

Coaching career (HC unless noted)
- 1924: Cornell (assistant)

Accomplishments and honors

Championships
- 2× National (1921, 1922)

Awards
- All-American (1921, 1922)

Leonard Christopher "Swede" Hanson (March 29, 1900 – October 1969) was a college football player and wrestler and later coach at Cornell University. He was inducted into the Cornell Athletics Hall of Fame in 1980.

== Playing career ==
=== Football ===
Hanson was a prominent tackle for the Cornell Big Red football team. He also kicked.

==== 1921 ====
Norman E. Brown of the Central Press selected Hanson for All-American.

== Coaching career ==
He assisted Gil Dobie at his alma mater.
