= Swede Hanson =

Swede Hanson may refer to:

- Tom Swede Hanson (American football), National Football League player
- Robert Swede Hanson (wrestler), professional wrestler
- Leonard C. "Swede" Hanson, American football player for the Cornell Big Red.
- Peter "Swede" Hanson, Canadian politician

== See also ==
- Andy Swede Hansen, Major League Baseball player
