= Kevin Harmon =

American football player (born 1966)

No. 34
- Position: Running back

Personal information
- Born: October 26, 1966 (age 60); Queens, New York, U.S.
- Listed height: 6 ft 0 in (1.83 m)
- Listed weight: 190 lb (86 kg)

Career information
- High school: Bayside (Queens)
- College: Iowa
- NFL draft: 1988: 4th round, 101st overall pick

Career history
- Seattle Seahawks (1988–1989); Kansas City Chiefs (1990)*
- * Offseason or practice squad member only

Career NFL statistics
- Rushing yards: 37
- Rushing average: 12.3
- Return yards: 146
- Stats at Pro Football Reference

Kevin Anthony Harmon (born October 26, 1966) is an American former professional football player who was a running back for the Seattle Seahawks of the National Football League (NFL) from 1988 to 1989. He played college football for the Iowa Hawkeyes and was selected in the fourth round of the 1988 NFL draft with the 101st overall pick. He is the younger brother of former NFL players Derrick Harmon and Ronnie Harmon.

Pre-draft measurables
Height	Weight	Hand span	40-yard dash	10-yard split	20-yard split	20-yard shuttle	Vertical jump	Broad jump	Bench press
5 ft 11 7/8 in (1.83 m)	196 lb (89 kg)	8 1/2 in (0.22 m)	4.60 s	1.59 s	2.64 s	4.19 s	27.5 in (0.70 m)	8 ft 10 in (2.69 m)	8 reps
