= Ronnie Harmon =

American football player (born 1964)

No. 31, 33, 22
- Position: Running back

Personal information
- Born: May 7, 1964 (age 62); Queens, New York, U.S.
- Listed height: 5 ft 11 in (1.80 m)
- Listed weight: 200 lb (91 kg)

Career information
- High school: Bayside (Queens)
- College: Iowa
- NFL draft: 1986: 1st round, 16th overall pick

Career history
- Buffalo Bills (1986–1989); San Diego Chargers (1990–1995); Houston / Tennessee Oilers (1996–1997); Chicago Bears (1997)

Awards and highlights
- Pro Bowl (1992); Second-team All-American (1985); 2× First-team All-Big Ten (1984, 1985)

Career NFL statistics
- Rushing yards: 2,774
- Rushing average: 4.5
- Receptions: 582
- Receiving yards: 6,076
- Total touchdowns: 34
- Stats at Pro Football Reference

Ronnie Keith Harmon (born May 7, 1964) is an American former professional football player who was a running back for 12 seasons in the National Football League (NFL) from 1986 to 1997.

== Early life and college ==
Harmon was born in Queens, New York and played scholastically at Bayside High School in Queens, where he was a consensus all-city selection.

He played college football for the Iowa Hawkeyes, twice earning first-team all-conference honors in the Big Ten. As a senior, he was selected as a second-team All-American by the Newspaper Enterprise Association.

Harmon was better known for his receiving rather than his rushing capabilities, a reputation he earned after committing four fumbles, all of which resulted in turnovers, in a 45–28 loss for Iowa against UCLA in the 1986 Rose Bowl Game. It was a disappointing end to an otherwise superb season for Harmon, who rushed for 1,111 yards, caught 49 passes for 597 yards, and scored 10 touchdowns. Harmon finished his four seasons at Iowa with 4,028 yards from scrimmage, 126 receptions, 30 touchdowns, and 626 return yards on special teams.

Ronnie's brother Kevin replaced him at running back after his graduation from Iowa.

== Professional career ==
A 6 foot tall, 220-lb. running back, Harmon was selected by the Buffalo Bills in the first round (16th overall) of the 1986 NFL draft.

Harmon played four seasons with the Buffalo Bills. In his final game with Buffalo, a 1989 AFC Divisional Playoff game at the Cleveland Browns, Harmon dropped a potential game-winning touchdown pass from Jim Kelly with :09 left in the fourth quarter. According to Thurman Thomas, Harmon reportedly stated that his failure was Kelly's fault because the QB didn't throw the ball early enough. Probably not coincidentally, Harmon was not re-signed by Buffalo before the 1990 season.

Harmon signed with the San Diego Chargers in March 1990. He peaked in rushing yards in the 1991 season with 544 on 89 carries for 6.1 yards per carry for a touchdown while catching 59 passes for 555 yards while being named team MVP. When asked about his mood in 1992 as a player, he stated:

If I could run the ball, maybe I’d feel a little bit better about myself, but I don’t. A running back wants to run the ball. You can go to any running back and ask him what he’d rather do. He’ll tell you, ‘Run the ball.’ That’s why you’re a running back. I’m not a receiver. It’s just part of the job. Everybody categorizes me as a receiver. I’m stuck between a hard place and a rock. And a rock is a rock, so what can you do?

He reached the Pro Bowl the following season, catching a career high 79 passes on 914 yards while rushing for 235 yards. A reliable route-runner, Harmon played six years with the team. Harmon was on the roster for Super Bowl XXIX, where the Chargers lost 49–26 against the 49ers; he led his team in receiving with eight receptions for 68 yards. Ronnie's brothers Kevin and Derrick also played in the NFL.

Harmon had 2,774 rushing yards on 615 carries for an average of 4.5 yards per carry while catching 582 passes for 6,076 yards. He also returned 76 kicks for 1,415 yards for a total of 10,265 all-purpose yards.He is the only player with both 4.5 yards per carry on 600+ attempts and 10.4 yards per reception on 500+ receptions in NFL history. He retired as the first running back with 10,000 all-purpose yards on less than 20 fumbles, a mark that has since been matched by several players.

He had 51 receptions in the postseason, but he never scored a touchdown. His 51 postseason career receptions without a touchdown is the most by a player in NFL history.

== NFL career statistics ==
Legend
**Bold**	Career high

=== Regular season ===
Year	Team	Games		Rushing					Receiving				
Year	Team	GP	GS	Att	Yds	Avg	Lng	TD	Rec	Yds	Avg	Lng	TD
1986	BUF	14	2	54	172	3.2	38	0	22	185	8.4	27	1
1987	BUF	12	**10**	**116**	485	4.2	21	2	56	477	8.5	42	2
1988	BUF	**16**	1	57	212	3.7	32	1	37	427	11.5	36	3
1989	BUF	15	2	17	99	5.8	24	0	29	363	**12.5**	42	4
1990	SDG	**16**	2	66	363	5.5	41	0	46	511	11.1	36	2
1991	SDG	**16**	0	89	**544**	**6.1**	33	1	59	555	9.4	36	1
1992	SDG	**16**	2	55	235	4.3	33	**3**	**79**	**914**	11.6	**55**	1
1993	SDG	**16**	1	46	216	4.7	19	0	73	671	9.2	37	2
1994	SDG	**16**	0	25	94	3.8	15	1	58	615	10.6	35	1
1995	SDG	**16**	1	51	187	3.7	**48**	1	63	673	10.7	44	**5**
1996	HOU	**16**	6	29	131	4.5	25	1	42	488	11.6	43	2
1997	TEN	11	0	8	30	3.8	14	0	16	189	11.8	27	0
1997	CHI	1	0	2	6	3.0	4	0	2	8	4.0	6	0
		181	27	615	2,774	4.5	48	10	582	6,076	10.4	55	24

=== Playoffs ===
Year	Team	Games		Rushing					Receiving				
Year	Team	GP	GS	Att	Yds	Avg	Lng	TD	Rec	Yds	Avg	Lng	TD
1988	BUF	2	0	2	8	4.0	7	0	8	76	9.5	17	0
1989	BUF	1	0	0	0	0.0	0	0	4	50	12.5	22	0
1992	SDG	2	0	**8**	**36**	**4.5**	**10**	0	13	94	7.2	18	0
1994	SDG	**3**	0	5	22	4.4	**10**	0	**16**	117	7.3	20	0
1995	SDG	1	0	1	-1	-1.0	-1	0	10	**133**	**13.3**	**24**	0
		9	0	16	65	4.1	10	0	51	470	9.2	24	0
