= 1921 Cornell Big Red football team =

American college football season

1921 Cornell Big Red football

National champion (Helms, Houlgate, NCF) Co-national champion (Davis)
- Conference: Independent
- Record: 8–0
- Head coach: Gil Dobie (2nd season)
- Offensive scheme: Single-wing
- Base defense: 6–3–2
- Captain: Wilson S. Dodge
- Home stadium: Schoellkopf Field

Uniform
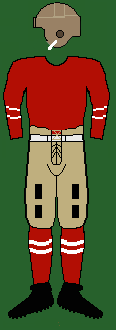

1921 Eastern college football independents records
	Conf.			Overall
Team	W	L	T	W		L		T
Washington & Jefferson		–		10	–	0	–	1
Lafayette		–		9	–	0	–	0
Cornell		–		8	–	0	–	0
Penn State		–		8	–	0	–	2
Yale		–		8	–	1	–	0
New Hampshire		–		8	–	1	–	1
Franklin & Marshall		–		6	–	1	–	2
Villanova		–		6	–	1	–	2
Carnegie Tech		–		7	–	2	–	0
Syracuse		–		7	–	2	–	0
Harvard		–		7	–	2	–	1
Boston University		–		6	–	2	–	0
Dartmouth		–		6	–	2	–	1
Brown		–		5	–	3	–	1
Bucknell		–		5	–	3	–	1
Geneva		–		5	–	3	–	1
Pittsburgh		–		5	–	3	–	1
Holy Cross		–		5	–	3	–	0
Army		–		6	–	4	–	0
Princeton		–		4	–	3	–	0
Boston College		–		4	–	3	–	1
Fordham		–		4	–	3	–	2
Penn		–		4	–	3	–	2
Colgate		–		4	–	4	–	2
Lehigh		–		4	–	4	–	0
Springfield		–		4	–	5	–	2
Vermont		–		3	–	4	–	0
NYU		–		2	–	3	–	3
Buffalo		–		2	–	3	–	2
Drexel		–		2	–	3	–	1
Rutgers		–		4	–	6	–	0
Rhode Island State		–		3	–	5	–	0
Columbia		–		2	–	6	–	0
Tufts		–		1	–	5	–	2
Duquesne		–		0	–	4	–	1

The 1921 Cornell Big Red football team was an American football team that represented Cornell University as an independent during the 1921 college football season. In its second season under head coach Gil Dobie, Cornell compiled an 8–0 record, shut out five of eight opponents (including a 110–0 win over Western Reserve), and outscored all opponents by a total of 392 to 21, culminating in an invitation to participate in the 1922 Rose Bowl game. The 1921 season was part of a 26-game winning streak that continued until October 1924 and included national championship claims for 1921, 1922, and 1923.

There was no contemporaneous system in 1921 for determining a national champion. However, Cornell was retroactively named as the national champion by the Helms Athletic Foundation, Houlgate System, and National Championship Foundation, and as a co-national champion by Parke H. Davis.

Fullback Eddie Kaw was a consensus first-team selection on the 1921 All-American football team. Tackle Wilson S. Dodge was the team captain. Multiple Cornell players received All-Eastern honors: Kaw; quarterback George Pfann; halfbacks Floyd Ramsey and George P. Lechler; ends Charles E. Cassidy and David Munns; guard Leonard C. Hanson; and Dodge.

== Schedule ==
Date	Time	Opponent	Site	Result	Attendance	Source
October 1	3:00 p.m.	St. Bonaventure	Schoellkopf Field; Ithaca, NY	W 41–0	5,000	
October 8	3:00 p.m.	Rochester	Schoellkopf Field; Ithaca, NY	W 55–0		
October 15	3:00 p.m.	Western Reserve	Schoellkopf Field; Ithaca, NY	W 110–0		
October 22	2:30 p.m.	Colgate	Schoellkopf Field; Ithaca, NY (rivalry)	W 31–7	12,000	
October 29	2:30 p.m.	Dartmouth	Schoellkopf Field; Ithaca, NY (rivalry)	W 59–7	13,000–14,000	
November 5		at Columbia	Polo Grounds; New York, NY (rivalry)	W 41–7	20,000	
November 12	2:30 p.m.	Springfield	Schoellkopf Field; Ithaca, NY	W 14–0		
November 24		at Penn	Franklin Field; Philadelphia, PA (rivalry)	W 41–0	28,000	

== Game summaries ==
=== St. Bonaventure ===
Team	1	2	3	4	Total
St. Bonaventure	0	0	0	0	0
• Cornell	0	13	21	7	41

- Date: Saturday, October 1, 1921
- Location: Schoellkopf Field, Ithaca, New York
- Game start: 3:00 p.m.
- Game attendance: 5,000
- Game weather: Fair
- Referee: Fred W. Murphy (Brown)

Seeking to improve on its 6–2 record at the conclusion of the 1920 season, Cornell opened its 1921 season at home against the St. Bonaventure Brown and White on Saturday, October 1. Though Cornell was victorious in the game, by a score of 41–0, The Ithaca Journal described the team as "anything but a finished product" but suggested it had the potential to develop into a "first rate aggregation of players". Despite Cornell's accumulation of 24 first downs to St. Bonaventure's eight over the entire game, Cornell was charged penalties totaling exactly 100 yards throughout, most of which were offside infractions, and St. Bonaventure drove to within ten yards of Cornell's goal line in one of its possessions. Additionally, the Journal reported that the Cornell defense struggled against St. Bonaventure's passing game, the backfield defenders having been drawn in towards the line of scrimmage on several such plays.

In the end, however, Cornell held St. Bonaventure scoreless and scored two touchdowns in the second quarter after itself having been held scoreless in the first, three touchdowns in the third and, after the second team had been substituted into the game, one additional touchdown in the fourth. Floyd Ramsey and John Wahl each recorded two touchdowns, while G. P. Lechler and David Munns each recorded one.

=== Rochester ===
Team	1	2	3	4	Total
Rochester	0	0	0	0	0
• Cornell	21	7	20	7	55

- Date: Saturday, October 8, 1921
- Location: Schoellkopf Field, Ithaca, New York
- Game start: 3:00 p.m.
- Referee: C. J. Eccles (W&J)

Following its game one win against St. Bonaventure, the Cornell Big Red faced the Rochester Yellowjackets in its second game of the season. Cornell defeated the Yellowjackets, by a score of 55–0, on the strength of a quicker start for its offense than during the first game, in which Cornell had been held scoreless until the second quarter. The Ithaca Journal noted that the team "appeared to get together better" than during its first game, with the scoring beginning with a George Pfann touchdown run within the first seven minutes of the game, the first of three in the opening quarter. Though Rochester's defense allowed Cornell only one touchdown in the second quarter, Cornell was able to add three more touchdowns in the third quarter and one more in the fourth.

The Journal suggested that "there is little doubt that [head] Coach [Gil] Dobie will have a well polished, fast working team by the time of the Colgate game", but that "the team [...] still shows some crudeness and lack of coordination", with vulnerability still noted against the passing game, the Rochester offense managing to nearly reach the Cornell one-yard line on the strength of aerial play, similar to St. Bonaventure's effort the week prior. In the game, Pfann scored three touchdowns, while Eddie Kaw and Floyd Ramsey each scored two, and David Munns scored one. With the victory, Cornell improved to 2–0 in the season.

=== Western Reserve ===
Team	1	2	3	4	Total
Western Reserve	0	0	0	0	0
• Cornell	21	34	21	34	110

- Date: Saturday, October 15, 1921
- Location: Schoellkopf Field, Ithaca, New York
- Game start: 3:00 p.m.
- Elapsed time: 0:52
- Referee: Oliver Cutts (Bates)

In its third game of the season, Cornell faced the Western Reserve Pioneers, a team The Ithaca Journal described as "much lighter than the Cornell outfit and without anywhere near the same amount of training". As such, Cornell was able to put together its most lopsided victory since its 128–0 defeat of Rochester during the 1898 season, though the Journal dismissed the 110–0 victory as "one of the most spectacular but at the same time poorest games", amounting to "hardly good practice" against what it assessed as a weak opponent. Though Western Reserve attempted an aerial assault against Cornell's defense, it was able to record only one first down in the 52-minute game. Cornell recorded a total of 16 touchdowns during the match, with Lechler and Olney recording four each, Ramsey, Pfann, and Golds each recording two, and Kaw and Rooney recording one. Cornell improved to 3–0 at the contest's conclusion, though the Journal, in writing off the meaningfulness of the win, opined that the strength of the Cornell team would not be tested until facing Colgate the following Saturday, as well as Dartmouth the week after.

=== Colgate ===
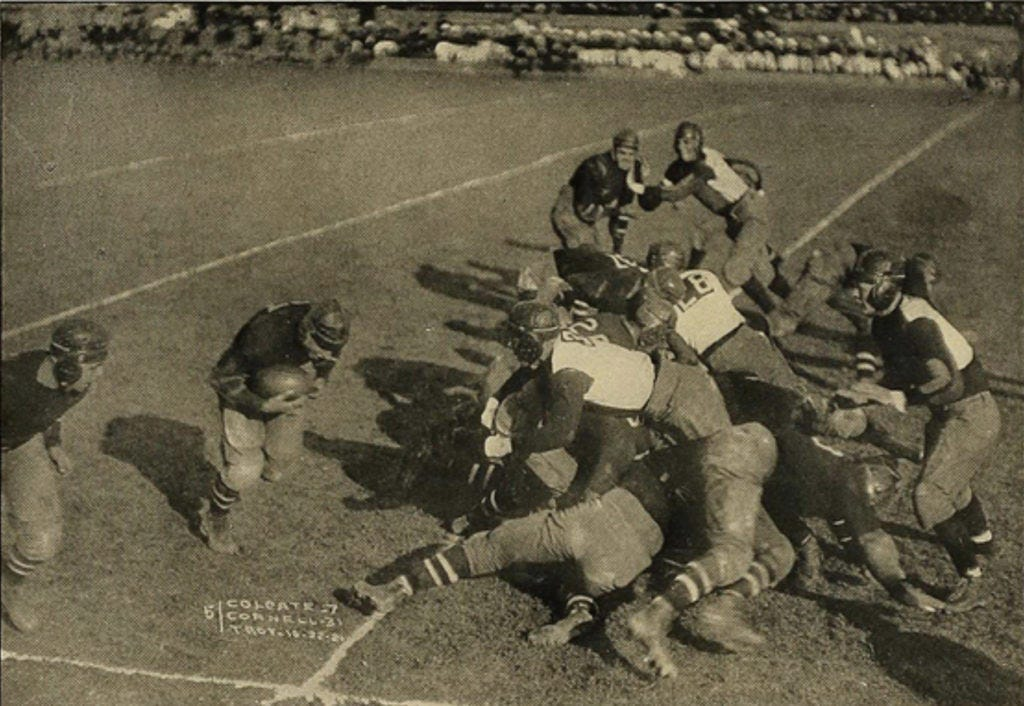
Floyd Ramsey (second from left) runs the football against Colgate on Saturday, October 22

Team	1	2	3	4	Total
Colgate	7	0	0	0	7
• Cornell	7	7	3	14	31

- Date: Saturday, October 22, 1921
- Location: Schoellkopf Field, Ithaca, New York
- Game start: 2:30 p.m.
- Game attendance: 12,000
- Referee: Carl A. Reed (Springfield)

Following its 3–0 start to the season, including its 110–0 rout of Western Reserve during the preceding week, Cornell remained at home to face its next opponent, historical rival Colgate University. Though Cornell entered the contest as the favorite, local print media anticipated that the matchup would be the Cornell team's first significant test of the season. Cornell fumbled the football three times early in the match and Colgate was able to capitalize, recovering the third and scoring a touchdown in the first quarter, the first points of the game and also the first points recorded against the Cornell defense during the season. Leading 7–0, Colgate would not score again, however, and Cornell tied the game at 7–7 before the halfway point in the first quarter, with a forward pass from Eddie Kaw to David Munns at the five-yard line, which Munns was able to carry the remainder of the way to the goal line. Cornell was able to record a second touchdown during the second quarter, though in its next attempt was stopped on downs by the Colgate defense on Colgate's 35-yard line. The ensuing field goal attempt narrowly missed, "by inches", and the score remained 14–7 at halftime.

Cornell opened scoring in the second half with a successful field goal attempt from Colgate's 30-yard line, resulting in the only points recorded by either team during the third quarter. Leading 17–7 at the beginning of the fourth quarter, Cornell further pulled away, recording two additional touchdowns to secure the 31–7 victory over Colgate. The first resulted from the offensive rushing game and the second resulted from an Eddie Kaw rush immediately following a Cornell interception returned to Colgate's 10-yard line. One touchdown each was recorded by Munns, Lechler, Ramsey, and Kaw and Cornell improved to 4–0.

=== Dartmouth ===
Team	1	2	3	4	Total
Dartmouth	0	7	0	0	7
• Cornell	7	7	21	24	59

- Date: Saturday, October 29, 1921
- Location: Schoellkopf Field, Ithaca, New York
- Game start: 2:30 p.m.
- Game attendance: est. 13,000–14,000
- Referee: J. A. Evans (Williams)

Following its victory against Colgate, Cornell turned to rival Dartmouth College in a match The Ithaca Journal described as "one of the two hardest battles on the Cornell schedule" against a "victor over Cornell for several successive season[s]". Cornell again emerged victorious in the matchup, improving to 5–0 and producing its widest victory against Dartmouth up to that time, 59–7. After exchanging punts with the visitors, Cornell scored first in the opening quarter and took a 7–0 lead. Dartmouth, however, tied the game when it recorded a touchdown of its own in the second quarter, on two plays following a "muffed" pass from George Pfann which was returned to Cornell's 25-yard line. The Dartmouth defense was able to hold Cornell to two touchdowns in the first two quarters of play, with Cornell scoring again late in the second on a G. P. Lechler rush.

Cornell held a 14–7 lead at halftime as it had the week prior, but opened a commanding lead in the third quarter, scoring three touchdowns on the strength of a rushing game led by Pfann and Eddie Kaw and designed by coach Gil Dobie to batter the Dartmouth defensive front. Cornell followed in the fourth with three additional touchdowns and a drop kick field goal from Dartmouth's 39-yard line, cementing the 52-point victory. Cornell's Olney scored three touchdowns, all in the third quarter, while Lechler and Carey each scored two, and Ramsey scored one. The game was the fifth meeting of the Cornell and Dartmouth football teams, and was Cornell's first victory in the series since the initial meeting on October 27, 1900, Dartmouth having won three successive meetings in 1912, 1919, and 1920 and outscoring Cornell in those games 47–3.

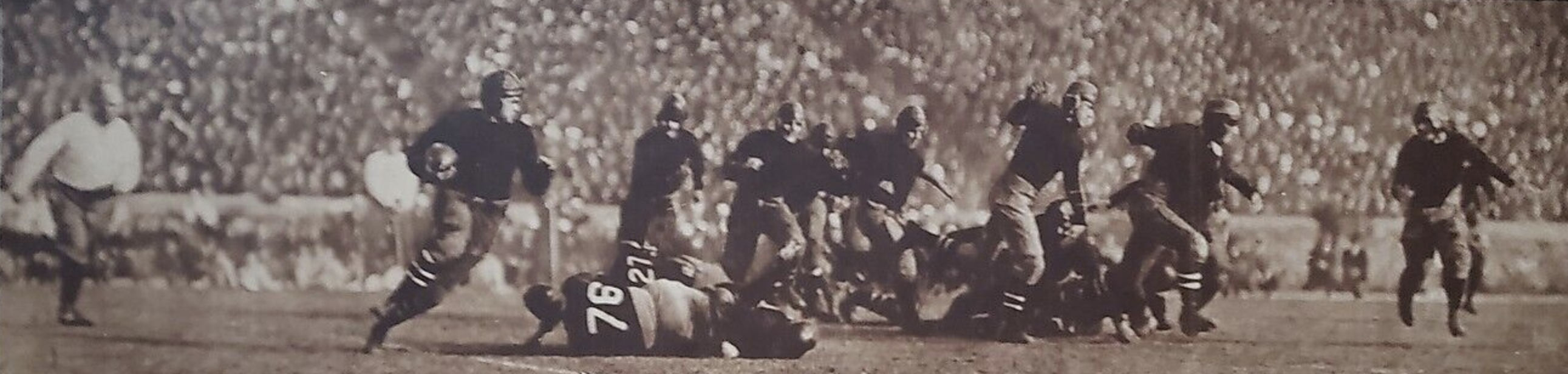
Eddie Kaw records a 35-yard run during the third quarter against Dartmouth on Saturday, October 29

=== At Columbia ===
Team	1	2	3	4	Total
• Cornell	21	13	0	7	41
Columbia	0	0	0	7	7

- Date: Saturday, November 5, 1921
- Location: Polo Grounds, New York, New York
- Game attendance: 20,000
- Referee: Carl A. Reed (Springfield)

Cornell traveled to the Polo Grounds in New York City for the first of its two away games of the season, against the Lions of Columbia University. The Cornell offense got off to a fast start during the first half of the game, propelled by the rushing effort of Eddie Kaw, who was able to gain yardage in 10-, 15-, and 30-yard increments at a time enabling Cornell to open up a 21–0 lead in the first quarter and to expand the lead to 34–0 by the conclusion of the second. Kaw and the other Cornell ball carriers were aided by the blocking of the Cornell offensive front which, in the assessment of The Ithaca Journal, "opened up big holes time and again and formed almost perfect interference for the man carrying the ball". Eddie Kaw scored all three of Cornell's touchdowns in the opening quarter, one a 20-yard run and another following a George Pfann interception on Columbia's 35-yard line. Pfann scored the two second quarter Cornell touchdowns. The first resulted from a long series beginning on Cornell's 35-yard line. The second was highlighted by a 70-yard punt return by Kaw, from Cornell's 15-yard line to Columbia's 15-yard line, after Kaw recovered his own fumble. Pfann thereafter scored Cornell's fifth touchdown, expanding the lead by halftime.

Cornell faced stronger resistance from the Columbia defense in the second half of the game, being held scoreless in the third quarter and limited to a single touchdown in the fourth. Though able to move the ball into Columbia territory throughout the second half, Cornell was afflicted with penalties in addition to Columbia's resistance and was not able to score again until its final touchdown, a 26-yard rush by Kaw, his fourth touchdown of the game. Trailing 41–0, Columbia recorded its first and only points of the game, a short pass following a Columbia interception returned to Cornell's 9-yard line. Guard Leonard Hanson sustained a minor injury in the first quarter, though the Journal reported that he would be in good condition for the game against Springfield the following Saturday.

Prior to the match against Columbia, Cornell announced that it would no longer travel with a live bear mascot as it had previously, citing the safety hazard such a captive animal might present as well as the preference of the coach, Dobie, who the Brooklyn Standard Union reported on November 4 to have said, "if any one connected with Cornell football is going to climb a goal post it shall be a player on the way to a touchdown, and not the mascot".

=== Springfield ===
Team	1	2	3	4	Total
Springfield	0	0	0	0	0
• Cornell	7	0	0	7	14

- Date: Saturday, November 12, 1921
- Location: Schoellkopf Field, Ithaca, New York
- Game start: 2:30 p.m.
- Game weather: Snowstorm, windy, muddy
- Referee: Oliver Cutts (Bates)

Cornell returned to Ithaca following its road victory against Columbia to face the Springfield Red and White in its penultimate game, and final home game, of the season. Eddie Kaw's (injury), G. P. Lechler's (injury), and team captain Wilson Dodge's (bereavement leave) absences from the lineup, as well as a blowing, visibility-hindering snowstorm and deep mud on the playing surface marked a low-scoring match in which Cornell managed only two touchdowns in its 14–0 victory over Springfield. The Cornell defense, however, held the visitors scoreless and prevented them from recording a single first down during the game's entirety. The Ithaca Journal opined that the relative closeness of the score did not indicate true parity between the teams, noting that "[t]he Cornellians had the ball in Springfield territory most of the time and several times the Cornell backs lost good opportunities to score through inability to hang on to the ball" in the inclement conditions.

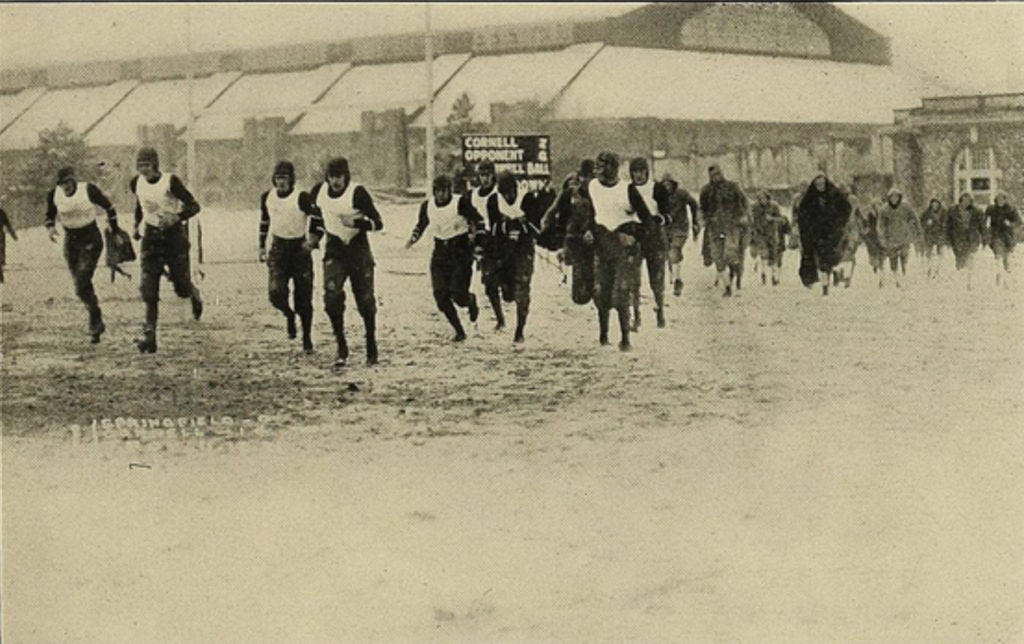
Cornell takes the field in the snow for the second half against Springfield on Saturday, November 12, with the New York State Armory and Drill Hall in the background. The board in the midground indicates the score at halftime, Cornell 7, Opponent 0.

Cornell scored the first of its two touchdowns early when Floyd Ramsey rushed to cross Springfield's goal line in culmination of its first possession, which began on Cornell's 40-yard line. This opening drive gave Cornell a 7–0 lead. The score would remain unchanged until the final minutes of the closing quarter, when Cornell scored on a rush from Springfield's 4-yard line following a 25-yard punt return to Springfield's 30-yard line, Springfield having been forced to punt away from deep within its own territory. In spite of the conditions and the absences of some of its key players, the Cornell team was able to improve its record to 7–0, leaving only the final match against Pennsylvania between it and its first undefeated season since 1915 and its second in team history.

=== At Penn ===
Team	1	2	3	4	Total
• Cornell	14	13	7	7	41
Penn	0	0	0	0	0

- Date: Thursday, November 24, 1921 (Thanksgiving Day)
- Location: Franklin Field, Philadelphia, Pennsylvania
- Game attendance: 28,000
- Game weather: Rain, mist
- Referee: Oliver Cutts (Harvard)

In its final game of the 1921 season, the undefeated Cornell team traveled to Franklin Field in Philadelphia to face historic rival the University of Pennsylvania, per tradition, on Thanksgiving Day. In an afternoon game marked by rainy and muddy conditions, Cornell defeated the host team, 41–0, its largest margin over Pennsylvania in the history of the series to that point. In front of an estimated crowd of 28,000, of which The Ithaca Journal approximated 10,000 to be partial to Cornell, the Big Red opened scoring with two touchdowns in the first quarter en route to a 14–0 lead. The first came on a quarterback draw in which Eddie Kaw, now recovered from injury, dropped back as if he had intended to pass, luring the Penn secondary to come forward, and then ran the ball himself for 30 yards to cross the Penn goal line, evading two defenders in the process. After taking over on downs deep within Penn territory, Cornell ran four hard-hitting plays on the ground, culminating in G. P. Lechler diving over the line to cross the goal and record Cornell's second touchdown of the contest. Cornell scored twice more in the second quarter, the first an Eddie Kaw end run around the left side of Penn's defensive front from Penn's 16-yard line, and the second another Kaw end run on fourth-and-three from Penn's 8-yard line. Leonard Hanson missed the goal-after-touchdown kick, however, only his second miss of the season. At the halfway mark, Cornell held a 27–0 lead over Penn.

The second half saw lower scoring, though Cornell expanded the lead and continued its shutout of the Penn offense. In the third quarter, after exchanging punts with the host team, a Cornell lineman recovered a Pennsylvania fumble within the latter's territory and Eddie Kaw was able to score on the next play, again an end run around Penn's left flank, opening up a 34–0 lead. In the final quarter, following a Kaw fumble recovered by Penn, Penn encountered its first opportunity of the afternoon, rushing the ball from its own 44-yard line to the 50, again to Cornell's 48, and then again to Cornell's 38, this last play marking Penn's first successful first down conversion of the game. Penn drove to Cornell's 32-yard line, but was unable to capitalize and Cornell took over on downs. In its ensuing possession, highlighted by a 42-yard run by Floyd Ramsey (22 yards of which came after recovering from a brief slip), Kaw again rushed the ball for Cornell's final touchdown of the match. Penn later threatened again, recovering a Cornell fumble on Cornell's 22-yard line, though was again unable to capitalize; Cornell took over on downs at its own 8-yard line and possessed the ball until time expired, securing the victory and an undefeated season. Eddie Kaw scored five touchdowns in the final contest and G. P. Lechler recorded one.

== Season aftermath and legacy ==
The Ithaca Journal reported the following statement from 1913 team captain J. J. Munns following the 1921 Cornell team's final, Thanksgiving Day victory over its rival Penn:

The hoodoo of Franklin Field is dead. 41 to 0 being enough to bury any hoodoo. The outstanding features of the 1921 team were its sportsmanship, the sprit of confidence in every man to come through, and the superlative coordination between line and backs—in other words, football unity. The readjustment period in Cornell athletics is over. As an interested alumnus, I congratulate this team with all my heart.

The finale matchup against Penn marked Cornell's largest victory in the series since the first meeting in 1893, and only its fifth in the intervening 29 years. The Brooklyn Daily Eagle reported, on Cornell's claim to a title:

[W]ith the greatest score ever rolled up against the Red and Blue in these Thanksgiving classics, is it any wonder that followers of the Red and White are celebrating it as the greatest triumph in the history of Cornell football? And, coming as the climax to a season unblemished by a single defeat, in which the Ithacans have led the teams of the East as the greatest scoring machine, is it to be wondered at if they claim for their heroes the mythical Eastern championship? Who is there with a better claim to the title in the light of Penn State's tie score with Pitt?

Following Cornell's defeat of Penn and the culmination of its undefeated season, the Tournament of Roses Association invited the Big Red to participate in the 1922 Rose Bowl, to be played on New Year's Day 1922 in Pasadena, California, against the also undefeated California Golden Bears. Cornell declined the invitation, however, responding that "the next game will be with mid-year exams". The Helms Athletic Foundation and the National Championship Foundation each later named the Cornell Big Red the 1921 national champions, a result also produced by the Houlgate System, while Parke H. Davis named Cornell a 1921 co-champion in the nation (with Iowa).

The 1921 team totaled 56 touchdowns and outscored its opponents 392–21, including the 110–0 rout of Western Reserve. Eddie Kaw led the team with 13 touchdowns; G. P. Lechler and Charles Olney each recorded nine; Floyd Ramsey and George Pfann tallied seven apiece; David Munns scored three; John Wahl, William Carey, and Rooney each scored two; and George Gould and Don Post both scored one touchdown. Leonard Hanson led the team in kicked goals-after-touchdown, with 38, followed by Cary with seven, Wilson Dodge with four, and Frank Sundstrom with one. Cornell kicked two field goals, one each by Hanson and Cary. With each of the core 1921 offensive backfield quartet of Pfann, Kaw, Ramsey, and Charles E. Cassidy, among a number of others, returning to the varsity squad for 1922, the 1921 season would be the first of three consecutive undefeated seasons and three consecutive national championships claimed by Cornell. Cornell would not suffer a defeat until the 1924 season.

== Roster ==
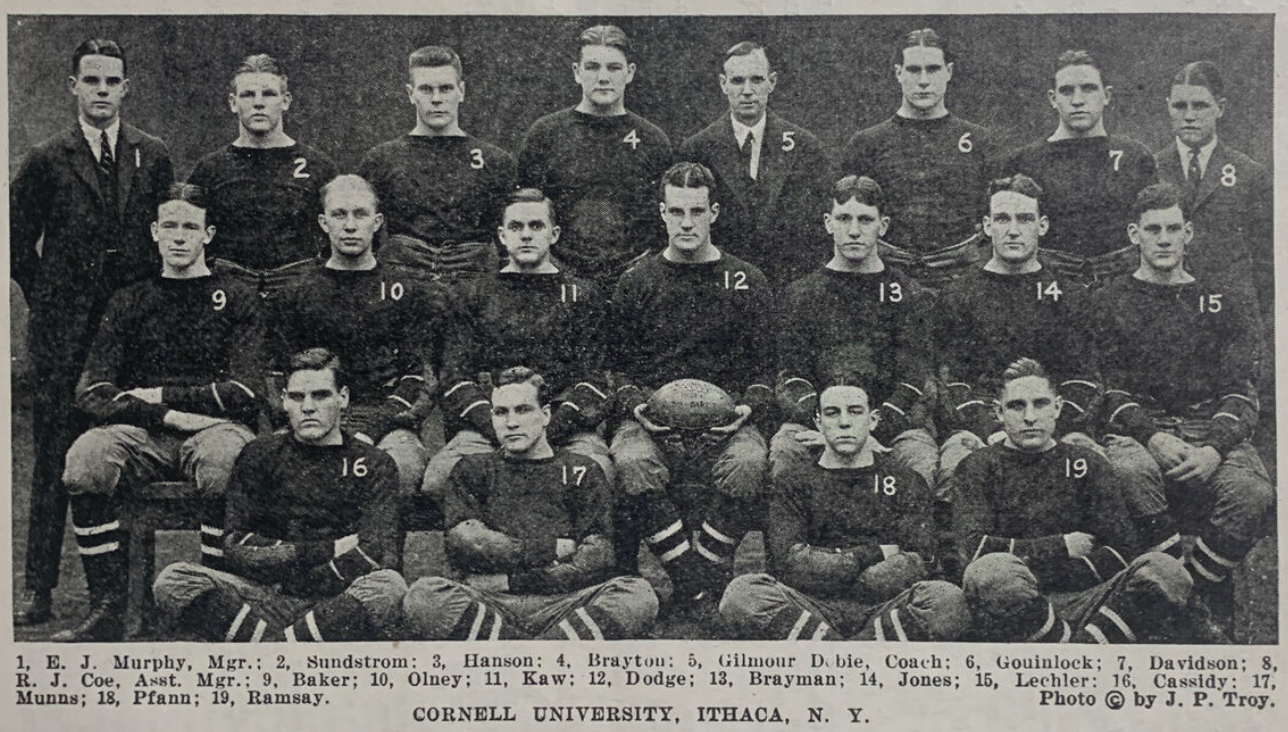
Lettermen and staff of the 1921 Cornell Big Red football team. From left to right, beginning with the back row and moving forward, pictured are: manager E. J. Murphy, Sundstrom, Hanson, Brayton, head coach Gilmour Dobie, Gouinlock, Davidson, assistant manager R. J. Coe, Baker, Olney, Kaw, team captain Dodge (holding football), Brayman, Jones, Lechler, Cassidy, Munns, Pfann, and Ramsey.

1921 Cornell Big Red football team
Pos.	Year	Name	Hometown
QB	Sophomore	**George Pfann**	Marion, Ohio
QB		Rooney	
FB	Junior	**Eddie Kaw**	Houston, Texas
FB	Junior	Edgar Calleson	Brooklyn, New York
HB	Sophomore	**Floyd Ramsey**	Auburn, New York
HB	Senior	**George P. Lechler**	Philadelphia, Pennsylvania
HB		George Gould	
HB		Don Post	
C	Junior	**Charles L. Brayton**	Montclair, New Jersey
G	Senior	**L. C. Brayman**	
G	Senior	**Reno V. Jones**	Niles, Ohio
E/K	Sophomore	**Charles E. Cassidy**	Honolulu, Hawaii
E	Junior	**David A. Munns**	
G/K	Junior	**Leonard C. Hanson**	Veblen, South Dakota
T	Senior	**Wilson S. Dodge** (c.)	Cleveland, Ohio
		John Wahl	
L	Sophomore	**Frank Sundstrom**	
L	Junior	**E. V. Gouinlock**	
L	Junior	**Charles L. Davidson**	
L	Sophomore	Buckley	
L		Kay	
L		Richards	
L		Hal Ebersole	
L		Parker	
K/P/HB	Junior	William Carey	
	Senior	**D.W. Baker**	
	Senior	**Charles W. Olney**	
**Bold** indicates varsity lettermen
