= Gil Dobie =

American football player and coach (1878–1948)

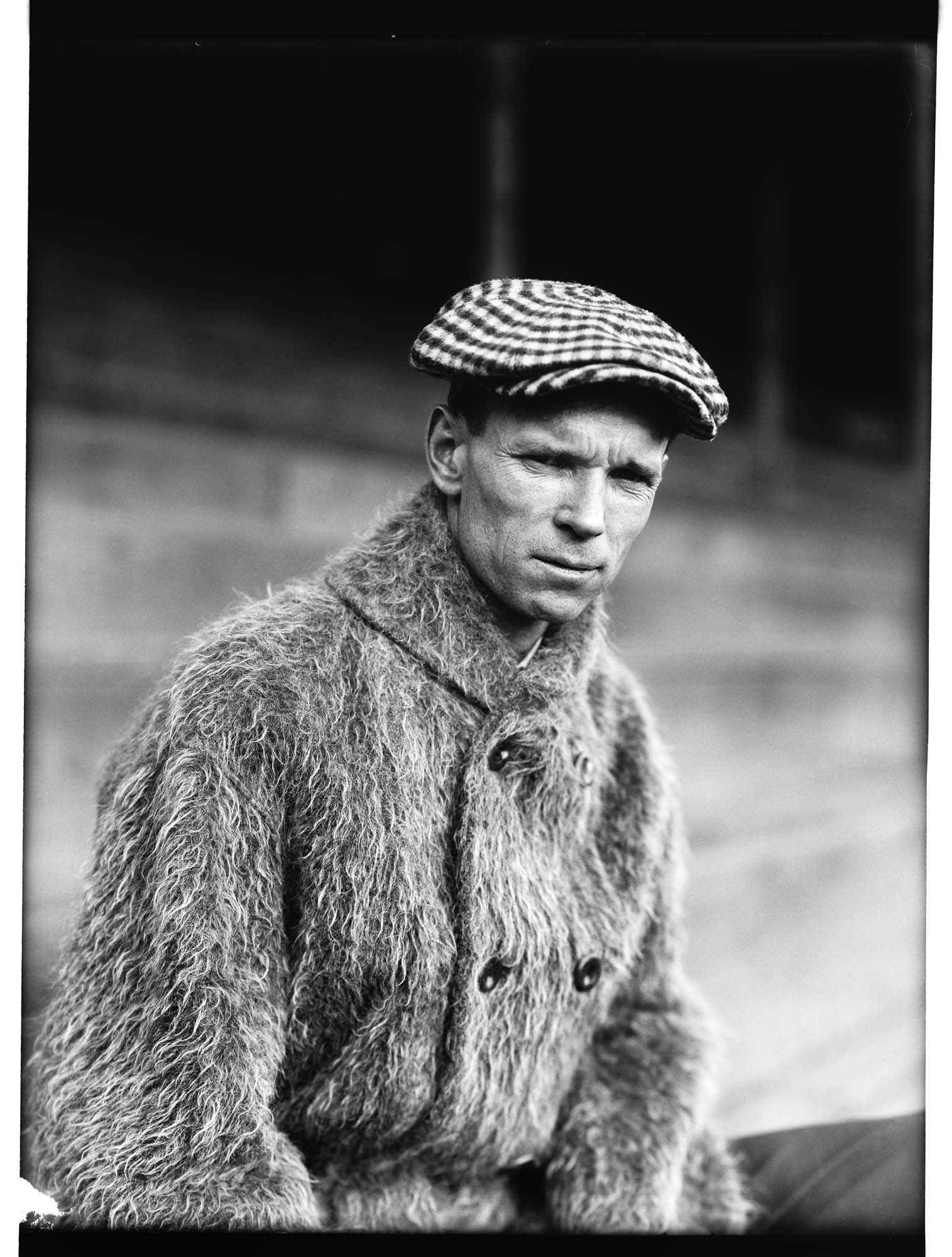
- Dobie in 1915

Biographical details
- Born: January 21, 1878; Hastings, Minnesota, U.S.
- Died: December 23, 1948 (aged 70); Hartford, Connecticut, U.S.

Playing career
- 1900–1902: Minnesota
- Positions: End, quarterback

Coaching career (HC unless noted)

Football
- 1906–1907: North Dakota Agricultural
- 1908–1916: Washington
- 1917–1919: Navy
- 1920–1935: Cornell
- 1936–1938: Boston College

Basketball
- 1906–1908: North Dakota Agricultural

Head coaching record
- Overall: 182–45–15 (football); 17–5 (basketball)

Accomplishments and honors

Championships
- 3 national (1921–1923); 9 Northwest Conference (1908–1916); 1 PCC (1916)

Awards
- Amos Alonzo Stagg Award (1948)
- College Football Hall of Fame; Inducted in 1951 (profile)

Robert Gilmour Dobie (January 21, 1878 – December 23, 1948) was an American college football player and coach. Over a period of 33 years, he served as the head football coach at North Dakota Agricultural College (now North Dakota State University) (1906–1907), the University of Washington (1908–1916), the United States Naval Academy (1917–1919), Cornell University (1920–1935), and Boston College (1936–1938), compiling a career college football head coaching record of 182–45–15 (.783).

Dobie's Cornell teams of 1921, 1922, and 1923 have been recognized as national champions. Dobie was also the head basketball coach at North Dakota Agricultural for two seasons from 1906 to 1908, tallying a mark of 17–5. He was inducted into the College Football Hall of Fame as a coach in 1951. Dobie reached 100 career wins in 108 games, which stood as the NCAA record for the fewest games needed to reach 100 wins from 1921 to 2014.

== Early life and playing career ==
Dobie was born in Hastings, Minnesota. He played football as an end and quarterback at the University of Minnesota.

== Coaching career ==
Dobie achieved his greatest success at the University of Washington in Seattle, where he had a 58–0–3 record as a head coach. During his tenure, Washington had a forty-game winning streak, which is the second longest in NCAA Division I-A/FBS history. His coaching career at Washington also comprised virtually all of Washington's 64-game unbeaten streak — still a college football record.

Dobie then became the 16th head coach for the United States Naval Academy Midshipmen and held that position for three seasons, from 1917 to 1919. His coaching record at the Navy was 18–3. This ranks him 14th at the Navy in total wins and first at Navy in winning percentage (.857), as of the end of the 2007 season.

After coaching at Navy, Dobie won three national championships with Cornell, in 1921, 1922, and 1923 with Eddie Kaw and George Pfann. After his first season, he signed a five-year contract. During his first championship season at Cornell, he collected his 100th career win, doing so in 108 games—an NCAA record that stood until 2014, when Lance Leipold reached the mark in his 106th game at Division III Wisconsin–Whitewater. Dobie remains the fastest coach to 100 wins in major-college history. His career coaching record was 182 wins, 45 losses, and 15 ties, a .780 percentage. Of the 33 years he coached, he had 14 undefeated seasons.

At Boston College at least, the best play of the Dobie system was a smash-through tackle. Dobie was inducted into the College Football Hall of Fame in 1951 as a charter member.

Dobie is buried at Lake View Cemetery in Ithaca, New York.

== Head coaching record ==
=== Football ===
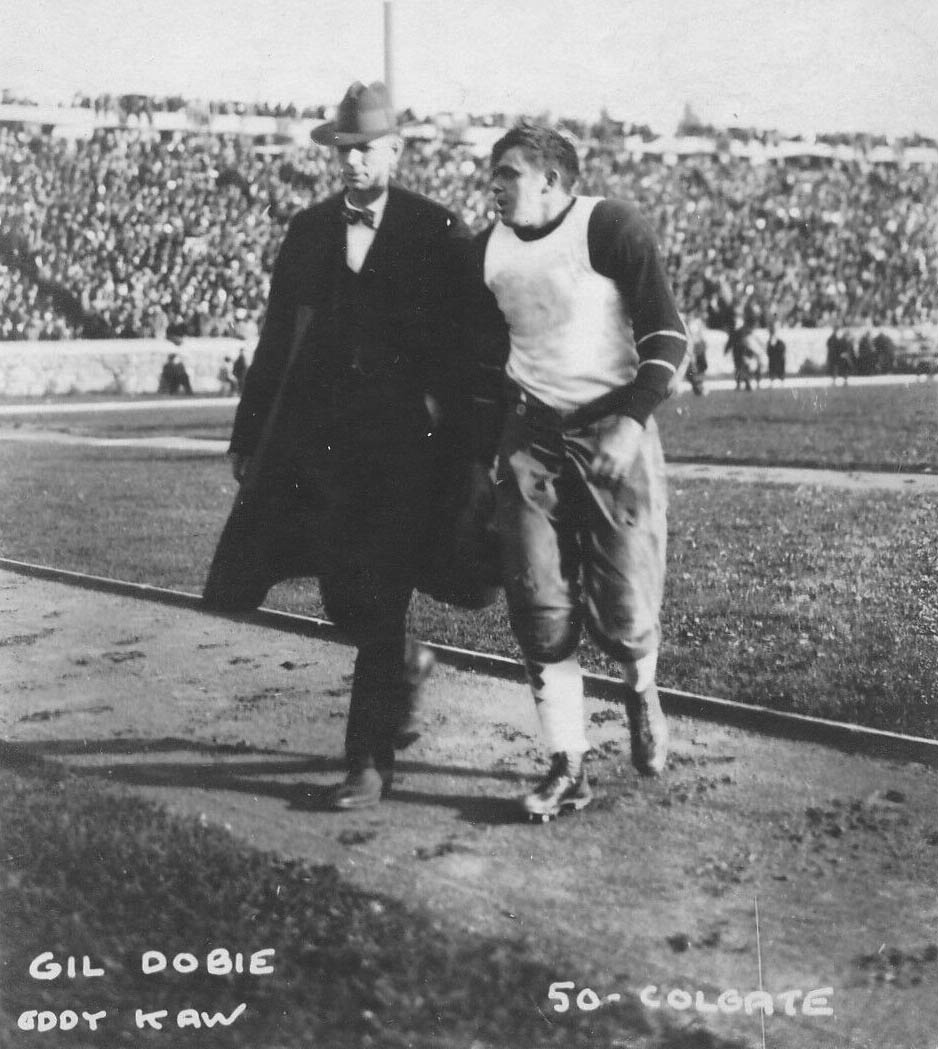
Dobie and player Eddie Kaw in Cornell, 1921

Year	Team	Overall	Conference	Standing	Bowl/playoffs
North Dakota Agricultural Aggies (Independent) (1906–1907)
1906	North Dakota Agricultural	5–0			
1907	North Dakota Agricultural	3–0			
North Dakota Agricultural:		8–0			
Washington (Northwest Conference) (1908–1915)
1908	Washington	6–0–1	3–0–1	1st	
1909	Washington	7–0	4–0	T–1st	
1910	Washington	6–0	4–0	1st	
1911	Washington	7–0	4–0	1st	
1912	Washington	6–0	4–0	1st	
1913	Washington	7–0	4–0	1st	
1914	Washington	6–0–1	3–0–1	1st	
1915	Washington	7–0	1–0	T–1st	
Washington (Northwest Conference / Pacific Coast Conference) (1916)
1916	Washington	6–0–1	2–0–1 / 3–0–1	1st / 1st	
Washington:		58–0–3	31–0–3		
Navy Midshipmen (Independent) (1917–1919)
1917	Navy	7–1			
1918	Navy	4–1			
1919	Navy	7–1			
Navy:		18–3			
Cornell Big Red (Independent) (1920–1935)
1920	Cornell	6–2			
1921	Cornell	8–0			
1922	Cornell	8–0			
1923	Cornell	8–0			
1924	Cornell	4–4			
1925	Cornell	6–2			
1926	Cornell	6–1–1			
1927	Cornell	3–3–2			
1928	Cornell	3–3–2			
1929	Cornell	6–2			
1930	Cornell	6–2			
1931	Cornell	7–1			
1932	Cornell	5–2–1			
1933	Cornell	4–3			
1934	Cornell	2–5			
1935	Cornell	0–6–1			
Cornell:		82–36–7			
Boston College Eagles (Independent) (1936–1938)
1936	Boston College	6–1–2			
1937	Boston College	4–4–1			
1938	Boston College	6–1–2			
Boston College:		16–6–5			
Total:		182–45–15			
National championship Conference title Conference division title or championship game berth
