= Derrick Harmon (running back) =

American football player (born 1963)

No. 24
- Position: Running back

Personal information
- Born: April 26, 1963 (age 63); New York City, U.S.
- Listed height: 5 ft 10 in (1.78 m)
- Listed weight: 202 lb (92 kg)

Career information
- High school: Bayside (Bayside, Queens)
- College: Cornell
- NFL draft: 1984: 9th round, 248th overall pick

Career history
- San Francisco 49ers (1984–1986)

Awards and highlights
- Super Bowl champion (XIX)

Career NFL statistics
- Rushing yards: 361
- Rushing average: 3.8
- Rushing touchdowns: 2
- Stats at Pro Football Reference

Derrick Todd Harmon (born April 26, 1963) is an American former professional football player who played running back for the San Francisco 49ers from 1984 to 1986.

Harmon played college football at Cornell University, where he still holds numerous records. He was a two-time Academic All-American, a member of the Associated Press Division I-AA All-America second-team, and a two-time member of the All-Ivy first-team. He received the Asa Bushnell Award as the Ivy League Player of the Year, and was named Cornell's first ever Sophomore of the Year in 1981 (now renamed Rookie of the Year). Harmon was the fourth person in Ivy League history to go over 1,000 yards in one season, running 1,056 yards in seven Ivy games in 1983, with his leading blocker, David Menapace. He was voted the team's Most Valuable Player and was named the Athlete of the Year of by The Cornell Daily Sun and The Ithaca Journal. Harmon graduated as an engineering physics major in 1984 and was a member of the Quill and Dagger society.

In 1984, Harmon was drafted to the National Football League in the ninth round by the San Francisco 49ers. It was not until 1997 that another Cornellian was drafted by the NFL. He played in the Super Bowl XIX win against the Miami Dolphins in 1985 and was the first alumnus of Cornell University to win a Super Bowl ring.

Harmon was inducted into the Cornell University Athletic Hall of Fame in 1989. He is the brother of NFL players Ronnie Harmon and Kevin Harmon. Derrick was an engineering student and later pursued a career in academics.
