= Raymond Starbuck =

American football player, coach, and railroad executive (1878–1965)

Biographical details
- Born: June 26, 1878; Fort Ann, New York, U.S.
- Died: August 16, 1965 (aged 87); Rochester, New York, U.S.

Playing career
- 1899–1900: Cornell
- Position: Fullback

Coaching career (HC unless noted)
- 1901–1902: Cornell

Head coaching record
- Overall: 19–4

Accomplishments and honors

Awards
- Consensus All-American (1900)

Raymond D. Starbuck (June 26, 1878 – August 16, 1965) was an American football player and coach and railroad executive.

Born in Fort Ann, New York, and raised in Glen Falls, New York, Starbuck attended Cornell University. He played fullback on the Cornell Big Red football team in 1899 and 1900. He was captain of the football team in 1899 and 1900 and was selected as a consensus All-American in 1900. In 1899, he led the Cornell team to its first victory over Princeton in the history of the rivalry. He served as the head coach of Cornell's football team in 1901 and 1902, compiling a record of 19–4. He worked for the New York Central Railroad from 1902 to 1949, eventually becoming an executive vice president and director. He retired in 1949 and died in 1965 at age 87 in Rochester, New York.

== Head coaching record ==
| Year | Team | Overall | Conference | Standing | Bowl/playoffs |
|---|---|---|---|---|---|
Cornell Big Red (Independent) (1901–1902)
| 1901 | Cornell | 11–1 | | | |
| 1902 | Cornell | 8–3 | | | |
| Cornell: | | 19–4 | | | |
| Total: | | 19–4 | | | |
