= Kevin Boothe =

American football player (born 1983)

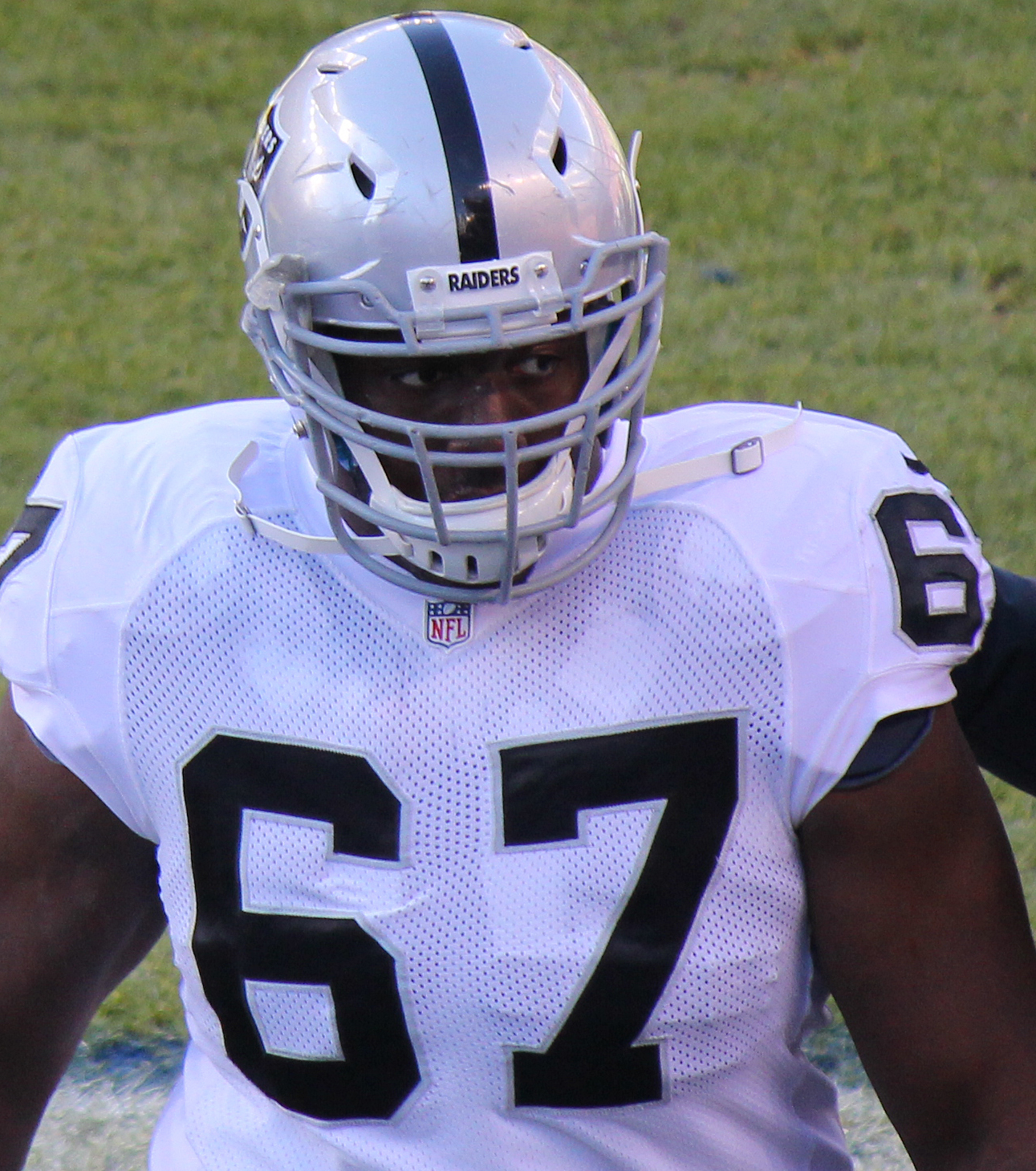
- Boothe with the Oakland Raiders in 2014

No. 67, 77
- Position: Offensive tackle

Personal information
- Born: July 5, 1983 (age 43); Queens, New York City, U.S.
- Listed height: 6 ft 5 in (1.96 m)
- Listed weight: 325 lb (147 kg)

Career information
- High school: Fort Lauderdale (FL) Pine Crest
- College: Cornell
- NFL draft: 2006: 6th round, 176th overall pick

Career history
- Oakland Raiders (2006); New York Giants (2007–2013); Oakland Raiders (2014)

Awards and highlights
- 2× Super Bowl champion (XLII, XLVI)

Career NFL statistics
- Games played: 114
- Games started: 62
- Fumble recoveries: 4
- Stats at Pro Football Reference

Kevin Mark Boothe (born July 5, 1983) is an American former professional football player who was an offensive tackle in the National Football League (NFL). He played college football for the Cornell Big Red. He was selected in the sixth round (176th overall) by the Oakland Raiders in the 2006 NFL draft. He also played for the New York Giants, winning two Super Bowls with the team, both against the New England Patriots.

== Early life ==
Boothe attended Pine Crest School in Fort Lauderdale, Florida, where he graduated in 2001.

== College career ==
Boothe attended Cornell University and was a three-time All-Ivy League selection and a member of Cornell's Quill and Dagger society.

== Professional career ==
Pre-draft measurables
Height	Weight	Arm length	Hand span	40-yard dash	10-yard split	20-yard split	20-yard shuttle	Three-cone drill	Vertical jump	Broad jump	Bench press
6 ft 4 3/4 in (1.95 m)	316 lb (143 kg)	33 3/4 in (0.86 m)	11 1/8 in (0.28 m)	5.41 s	1.80 s	3.07 s	5.07 s	8.36 s	31.5 in (0.80 m)	8 ft 2 in (2.49 m)	23 reps
All values from NFL Combine

=== Oakland Raiders (first stint) ===
In the 2006 NFL draft, Boothe was selected by the Oakland Raiders in the sixth round with the 176th overall pick. he was the first player drafted from Cornell since 1997. He finished the 2006 season as the starting right guard for the Oakland Raiders.

=== New York Giants ===
After being waived by the Raiders in the 2007 pre-season, Boothe was claimed by the New York Giants. He won Super Bowl XLII and XLVI with the Giants, both against Tom Brady and the New England Patriots, and he was the starting left guard in the latter game.

Set to become a free agent in 2013, Boothe re-signed with the Giants on a one-year contract on March 25, 2013.

=== Oakland Raiders (second stint) ===
After becoming a free agent after the 2013 season, Boothe signed a contract with his former team, the Raiders, on March 17, 2014. The contract was for two years worth $3.4 million. He played for Oakland mainly as a backup, appearing in nine contests and recording one fumble recovery. On May 4, 2015, Boothe was released by the Raiders.

== Post-playing career ==
On May 27, 2024, it was announced that Boothe was interviewing for front office jobs with NFL teams, following multiple seasons in the NFL league office.
