= Walter Matuszczak =

American football player and veterinarian (1918–2001)

Profile
- Position: Quarterback

Personal information
- Born: February 5, 1918; Lowville, New York, U.S.
- Died: November 18, 2001 (aged 83); Syracuse, New York, U.S.

Career information
- College: Cornell
- NFL draft: 1941: 10th round, 87th overall pick

Awards and highlights
- First-team All-American (1939); First-team All-Eastern (1940); Second-team All-Eastern (1939); Second-team Polish-American (1939); Cornell Athletics Hall of Fame (1979)

Walter John Matuszczak later changed the spelling of his last name to Matuszak (February 5, 1918 – November 18, 2001) was an American football player and veterinarian. Founder of DeWitt Animal Hospital in New York, he practiced there until 1971. Dr. Matuszak owned Wa-Noa Golf Club in East Syracuse, New York. A World War II veteran, Dr. Matuszak served as a captain in the Army Veterinary Corps.

A native of Lowville, New York, son of a Polish immigrants- Kasper J. Matuszczak and Marianna; Matuszczak was the youngest of twelve children. He played college football for the Cornell Big Red football team and was selected by the New York Sun as the first-team quarterback on the 1939 College Football All-America Team. He was named to the Second 1939 College Football All Polish-American Team. He was also elected as the captain of Cornell's 1940 football team. He also played for Cornell's basketball and baseball teams. He was inducted into the Cornell Athletics Hall of Fame in 1979.
Graduation from Cornell in 1941 - the same year he was selected by the New York Giants in the 10th round of the draft - he entered the New York State College of Veterinary Medicine, where he graduated in 1943.

He married Mildred C. Nohle on August 22, 1942; two daughters: Judith L. Hodhe, Diane J. Tsibulsky, two sons: W. David Matuszak, Charles Matuszak.
