= Eddie Kaw =

American football player (1897–1971)

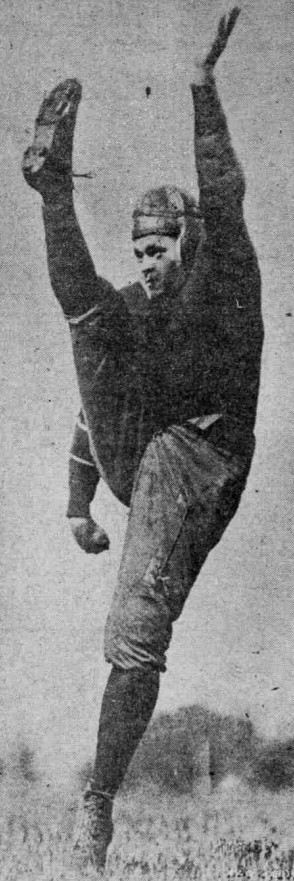
- Kaw in October 1922

Profile
- Position: Halfback

Personal information
- Born: January 18, 1897; Houston, Texas, U.S.
- Died: December 13, 1971 (aged 74); Walnut Creek, California, U.S.
- Listed height: 5 ft 10 in (1.78 m)
- Listed weight: 168 lb (76 kg)

Career information
- College: Cornell

Career history
- Buffalo Bisons (1924)

Awards and highlights
- 2× National champion (1921, 1922); 2× Consensus All-American (1921, 1922)
- College Football Hall of Fame

Edgar Lawrence Kaw (January 18, 1897 – December 13, 1971) was an American football player. He attended Cornell University, where he was a prominent halfback on coach Gil Dobie's Cornell Big Red football team, graduating in 1923. He was a shifty open-field runner known as one of the sport's greatest. His stride had one foot farther than the other. Kaw scored 90 points in 1921. That year, Cornell beat Penn 41–0 in the mud, and Kaw scored five touchdowns. Kaw "skipped over the ooze and water as if he were running on a cinder track, sidestepping a small lake and a Penn tackler with one and the same motion." He was elected into the Sphinx Head Society during his senior year. Kaw played 11 games for the Buffalo Bisons in 1924.

In 1956, Kaw, then a resident of Oakland, California, was inducted into the College Football Hall of Fame. He was flown to New York and inducted into the Hall of Fame during a halftime ceremony at the Cornell–Harvard game in October 1956. He died in Walnut Creek, California in 1971.
