= George Pfann =

American football player and coach (1902–1996)

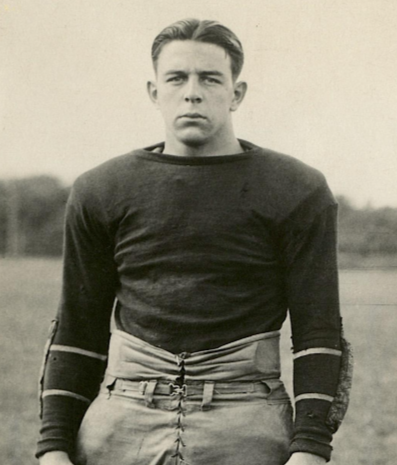
- Pfann in 1922

Biographical details
- Born: October 6, 1902; Marion, Ohio, U.S.
- Died: December 17, 1996 (aged 94); Ithaca, New York, U.S.

Playing career

Football
- 1921–1923: Cornell

Basketball
- 1921–1923: Cornell

Lacrosse
- 1923–1924: Cornell
- Position: Quarterback (football)

Coaching career (HC unless noted)

Football
- 1924–1925: Cornell (assistant)
- 1931–1935: Swarthmore

Basketball
- 1924–1926: Cornell (freshmen)

Head coaching record
- Overall: 8–26–1

Accomplishments and honors

Championships
- 3× National (1921, 1922, 1923)

Awards
- Consensus All-American (1923); Rockne All-time All-America team
- College Football Hall of Fame; Inducted in 1957 (profile)

George R. Pfann (October 6, 1902 – December 17, 1996) was an American college football player and coach, decorated officer serving on George Patton's staff during World War II, and a member of the Cornell University Board of Trustees. He played college football at the quarterback position for the Cornell Big Red football teams and was selected as an All-American in both 1922 and 1923. He also served as Swarthmore's head football coach from 1931 to 1935.

== Early years ==
Pfann was born in 1902 in Marion, Ohio. His father died when he was a young boy. He was raised in Marion by his mother and grandparents in a large brick house at the corner of Washington and Delaware Avenue. His mother died as well, and he and his sister were raised by an uncle and aunt. Pfann and his sister inherited "a small fortune" from their mother. He attended Harding High School in Marion but transferred in his sophomore year to the Columbia Military Academy in Columbia, Tennessee. He was selected as an all Southern scholastic quarterback while attending Columbia in 1917.

== Cornell ==
Pfann attended Cornell University and led three consecutive Cornell Big Red football teams to undefeated seasons: 1921 (8–0), 1922 (8–0), and 1923 (8–0). He was a triple-threat man who also excelled as a kicker and defensive player. Pfann was also captain of the 1923 team and the consensus first-team quarterback on the 1923 All-America college football team.

Pfann was also a star player on Cornell's lacrosse team and played for the school's basketball team.

Pfann graduated from Cornell in 1924 and then enrolled in law school at Cornell. He served as an assistant football coach and freshman basketball coach while studying law at Cornell. He received a Rhodes Scholarship in 1926 and completed his legal studies at Brasenose College, Oxford. He played rugby while at Oxford.

== Later years ==
From 1931 to 1935, Pfann was the head football coach at Swarthmore College, compiling a record of 8–26–1. He additionally worked as an Assistant United States Attorney for the Southern District of New York from 1931 to 1937 before becoming a member of the law firm of Edwards & Smith in New York City.

During World War II, Pfann served in the U.S. Army and was secretary of General George S. Patton's Seventh Army and later Third Army general staff. He was promoted to the rank of major in July 1943 and to lieutenant colonel in December 1944. He was among Patton's Third Army staff officers decorated with Soviet military awards when Third Army linked up with Red Army units at war's end. Pfann received the Order of the Patriotic War Second Class.

After the war, Pfann returned to Ithaca where he worked on the legal staff of the Grange League Federation from 1945 to 1967.

Pfann was inducted into the National Football Hall of Fame (now known as the College Football Hall of Fame) in 1957. He was also inducted into Cornell's sports hall of fame in 1978 as a football and lacrosse player.

In 1967, he went into private legal practice. He also served on Cornell's board of trustees for 21 years. He died in 1996 at the Reconstruction Home in Ithaca at age 94.

== Head coaching record ==
Year	Team	Overall	Conference	Standing	Bowl/playoffs
Swarthmore Garnet Tide (Independent) (1931–1935)
1931	Swarthmore	1–6			
1932	Swarthmore	2–5			
1933	Swarthmore	2–4–1			
1934	Swarthmore	2–5			
1935	Swarthmore	1–6			
Swarthmore:		8–26–1			
Total:		8–26–1			
