= Cornell Big Red football =

Football team of Cornell University

2025 Cornell Big Red football team
- First season: 1887; 139 years ago
- Athletic director: Nicki Moore
- Head coach: Dan Swanstrom; 2nd season, 8–12 (.400)
- Location: Ithaca, New York, U.S.
- Stadium: Schoellkopf Field (capacity: 25,597)
- NCAA division: Division I FCS
- Conference: Ivy League
- Colors: Carnelian red and white
- All-time record: 666–568–34 (.539)

National championships
- Claimed: 1915, 1921, 1922, 1923, 1939

Conference championships
- Ivy League: 1971, 1988, 1990
- Consensus All-Americans: 16
- Rivalries: Colgate (rivalry); Columbia (rivalry); Dartmouth (rivalry); Penn (rivalry)

Uniforms
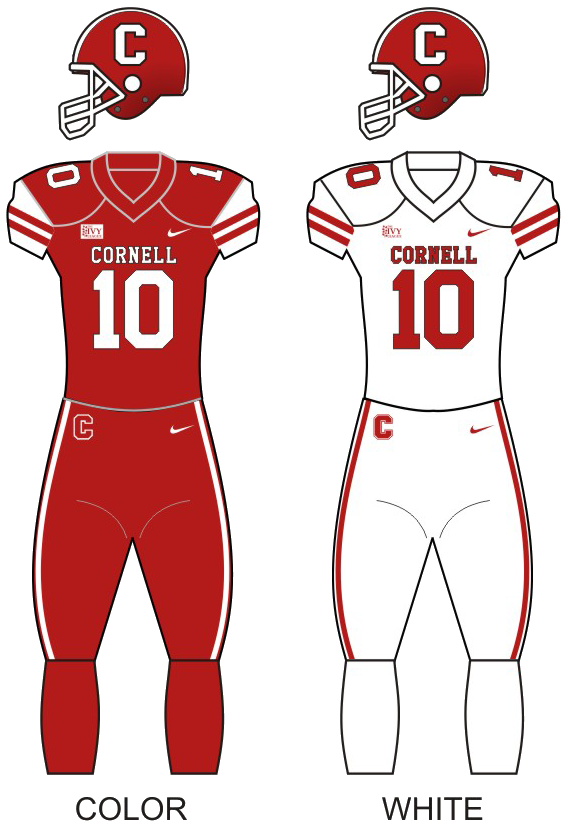
- Fight song: "Give My Regards to Davy"
- Website: CornellBigRed.com

The Cornell Big Red football team represents Cornell University in National Collegiate Athletic Association (NCAA) Division I Football Championship Subdivision (FCS) college football competition as a member of the Ivy League. It is one of the oldest and most storied football programs in the nation. The team has attained five national championships and has had seven players inducted into the College Football Hall of Fame.

== History ==
=== 19th century ===
In 1869, the first intramural football on the Cornell campus took place, although it did not resemble the modern sport and there were 40 players per side. In 1874, the university president and co-founder, Andrew Dickson White, disallowed a team of Cornell students from traveling to Cleveland to play Michigan. White said, "I refuse to let 40 of our boys travel 400 miles merely to agitate a bag of wind."

On November 12, 1887, Cornell played its first intercollegiate game against Union College, losing 24–10. The following year, Cornell recorded their first win by beating Palmyra, 26–0, and went on to finish the season with a 4–2 record. In 1889, Cornell played the University of Michigan Wolverines in Buffalo, New York, shutting out Michigan in a 66–0 victory.

In 1892, Pop Warner first played the game, and the Cornellians finished the season with a 10–1 record under head coach Carl Johanson, often referred to as the "Father of Cornell football". Two years later, in 1894, Warner rose to become the team's captain. After college, Warner began his coaching career and returned to Cornell in 1897. That year, he led the team to a 5–3–1 record. The following season, Cornell compiled a 10–2 record. Warner then moved on to coach the Carlisle Indians football team.

=== 20th century ===
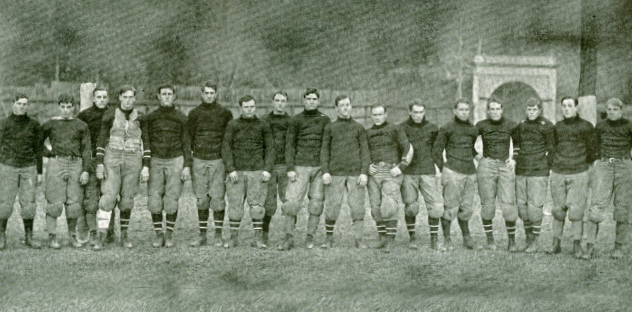
The 1904 Cornell Big Red football team coached by Pop Warner (not pictured)

In 1901, under first-year coach Ray Starbuck, the Cornellians outscored their opponents 324–38 and won 11 games for the only time in school history. Pop Warner returned as head coach from 1904 to 1906, during which time his teams posted a 21–8 record.

Cornell began playing Ivy League rival Penn in 1893. They have played 129 times since, in every year except 1918 and 2020, making this game the sixth-most played college football contest in the nation.

In 1915, Cornell won all nine of its games. They handed Harvard their first loss in 50 consecutive games, 10–0. Gil Dobie took over as head coach in 1920. In his first season, the Cornellians posted a 6–2 record, but in each of the subsequent three years they finished 8–0. Cornell was awarded the national championship for each of those three seasons by at least one selector. In those seasons, Cornell outscored its opponents, 1,051 points to 71.

Cornell defeated Penn State, 21–6, in 1938 to begin a school record unbeaten streak of 16 games. The Big Red compiled an 8–0 record in 1939 for its fifth national championship. The possibility of a Rose Bowl invitation that season was rebuffed by the university administration. The unbeaten streak came to an end in 1940 with the infamous Fifth Down Game. After the game, Cornell voluntarily forfeited to Dartmouth when review of film showed the Big Red had inadvertently used five downs. The ESPN College Football Encyclopedia named the game, and Cornell's honorable concession, the second greatest moment in college football history.

In 1951, Cornell beat defending Big Ten and Rose Bowl champion Michigan, 20–7. Between 1969 and 1971, running back Ed Marinaro broke numerous NCAA records with a career total of 1,881 yards and 24 touchdowns. His senior year, he finished as runner-up in the Heisman Trophy voting behind Pat Sullivan of Auburn. That same season, Cornell finished 6–1 to secure a share of the Ivy League conference championship for the first time. Following the 1981 season, the Ivy League was reclassified to Division I-AA, today known as the Football Championship Subdivision (FCS), Cornell moved to Division I-AA play with the rest of the league. Cornell twice more attained the Ivy League title, shared in 1988 with Penn and shared with Dartmouth in 1990. Beginning in 2018, Cornell has played New York State Ivy League rival, the Columbia Lions, in their final game. The victor is awarded the Empire Cup.

=== 21st century ===
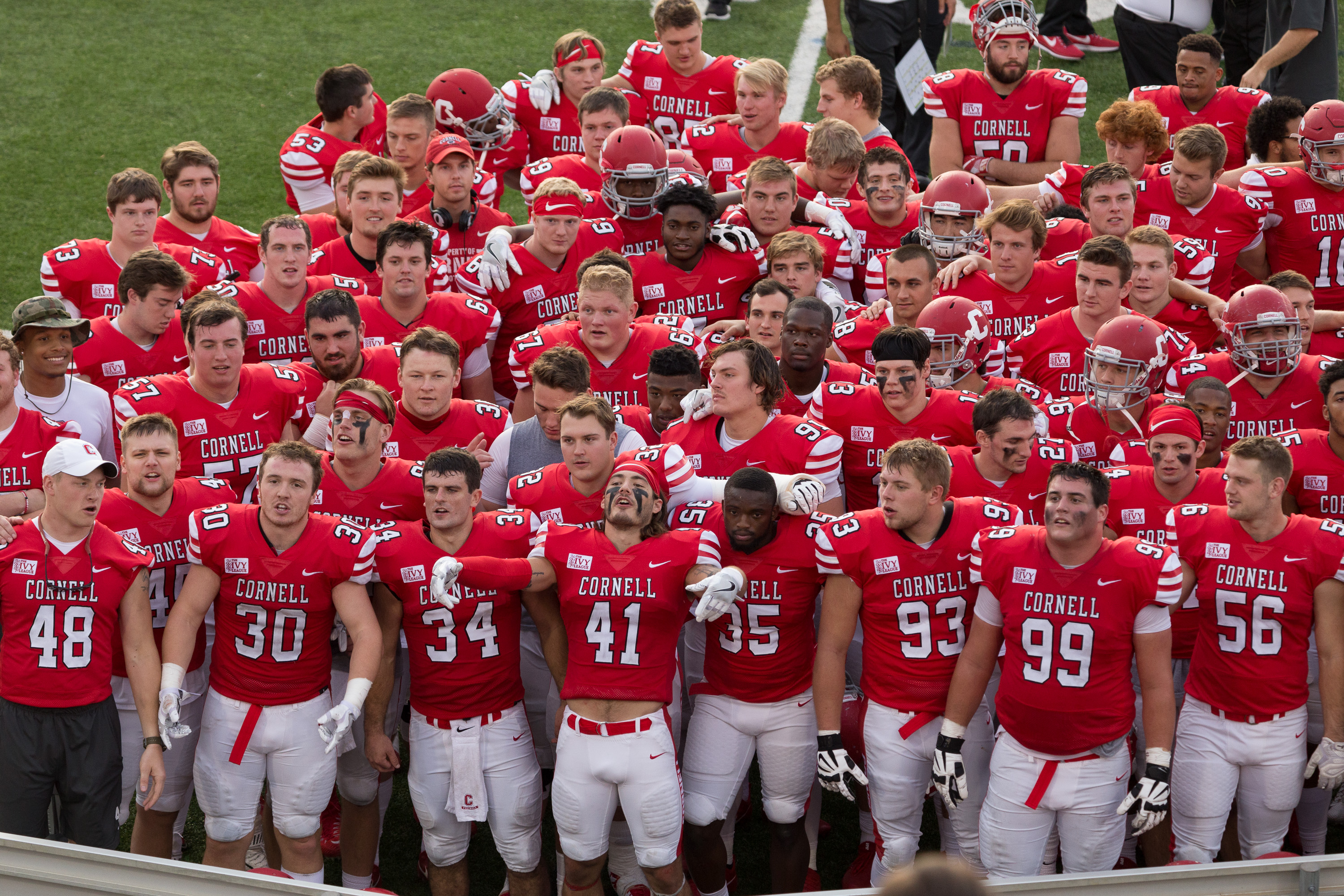
2017 team

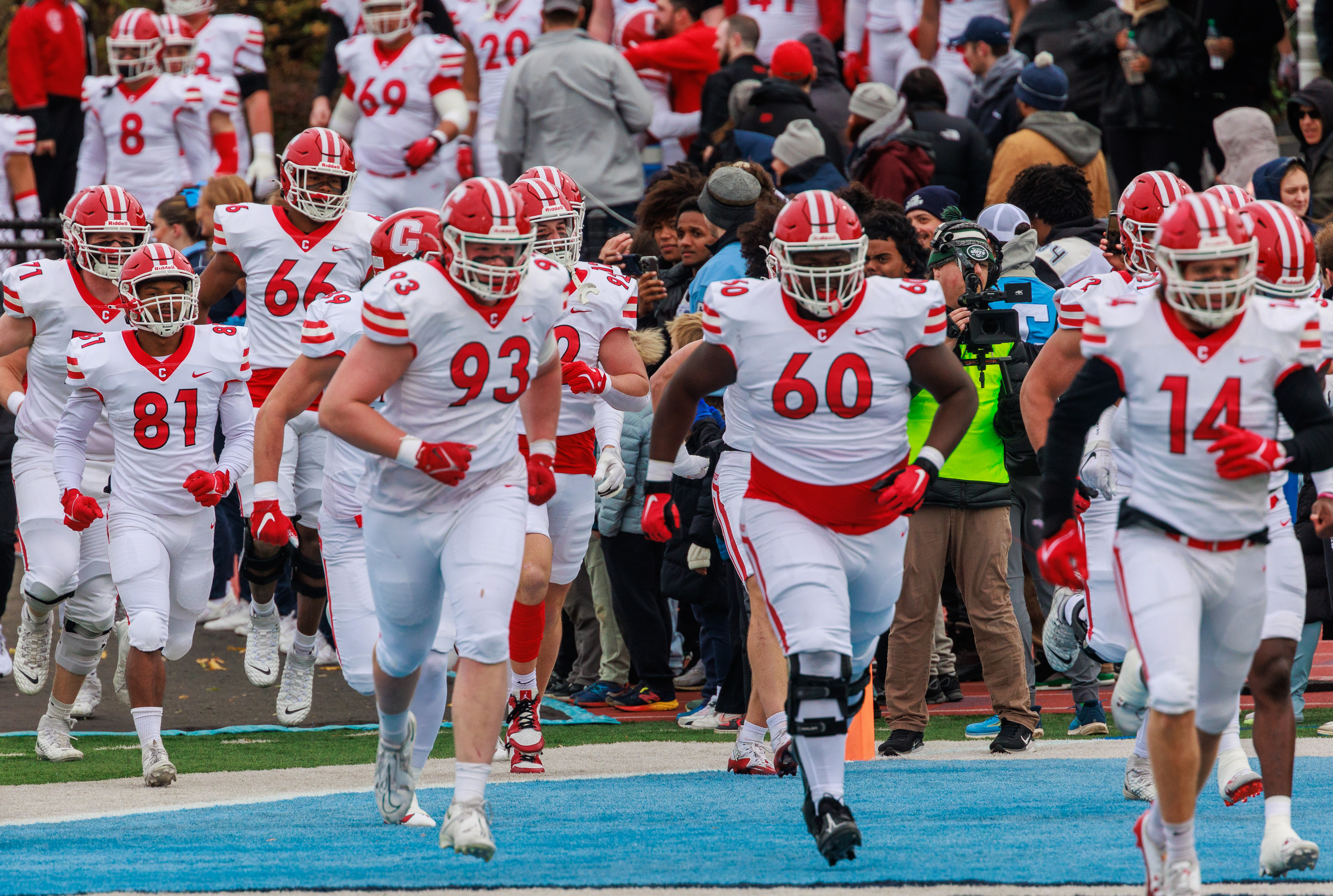
2024 team

The Ivy League announced that no sports would be played in the 2020 season because of the COVID-19 pandemic. The Big Red returned to Schoellkopf in September 2021 to play Virginia Military Institute, its first game after a 665-day hiatus.

== Conference affiliations ==
- Independent (1887–1955)
- Ivy League (1956–present)

== Championships ==
=== National championships ===
Cornell has won five (1915, 1921, 1922, 1923, 1939) national championships from NCAA-designated major selectors. Cornell claims all five championships.

Year	Selectors	Coach	Record
1915	Helms, Houlgate, National Championship Foundation, Parke Davis	Al Sharpe	9–0
1921	Helms, Houlgate, National Championship Foundation, Parke Davis	Gil Dobie	8–0
1922	Helms, Parke Davis	Gil Dobie	8–0
1923	Sagarin	Gil Dobie	8–0
1939	Litkenhous, Sagarin	Carl Snavely	8–0

=== Conference championships ===
Cornell has won three Ivy League championsnips, all shared.

Year	Conference	Coach	Overall record	Conference record
1971†	Ivy League	Jack Musick	8–1	6–1
1988†	Ivy League	Maxie Baughan	7–2–1	6–1
1990†	Ivy League	Jim Hofher	7–3	6–1

== Rivalries ==
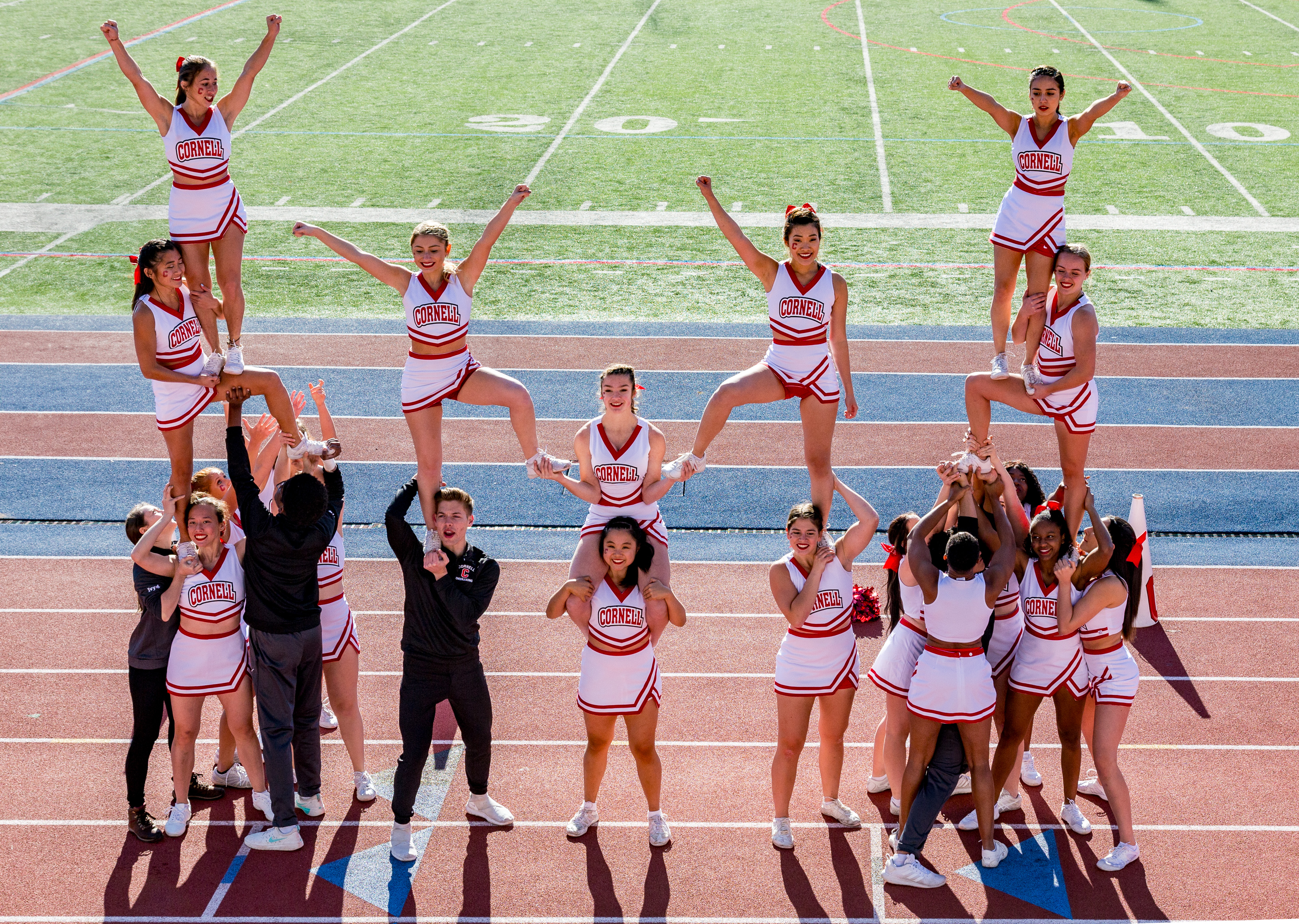
Cornell's cheerleaders at the Cornell-Penn game at Franklin Field on November 19, 2019

Cornell has several rivalries in football, most significantly the Penn Quakers. The rivalry between the two schools is the sixth most played rivalry in college football history. They play for the Trustees' Cup. The series is led by Penn with a record of 77–47–5.

== Notable players ==
=== Consensus All-Americans ===
- 1895 Clint Wyckoff, B
- 1900 Raymond Starbuck, B
- 1901 William Warner, G
- 1901 Sanford Hunt, G
- 1902 William Warner, G
- 1906 Elmer Thompson, G
- 1906 William Newman, C
- 1908 Bernard O'Rourke, C
- 1914 John O'Hearn, E
- 1914 Charles Barrett, B
- 1915 Murray Shelton, E
- 1915 Charles Barrett, B
- 1921 Edgar Kaw, B
- 1922 Edgar Kaw, B
- 1923 George Pfann, B
- 1932 José Martínez-Zorilla, E
- 1938 Brud Holland, E
- 1939 Nick Drahos, T
- 1940 Nick Drahos, T
- 1971 Ed Marinaro, RB (unanimous selection)

=== Players in the NFL draft ===
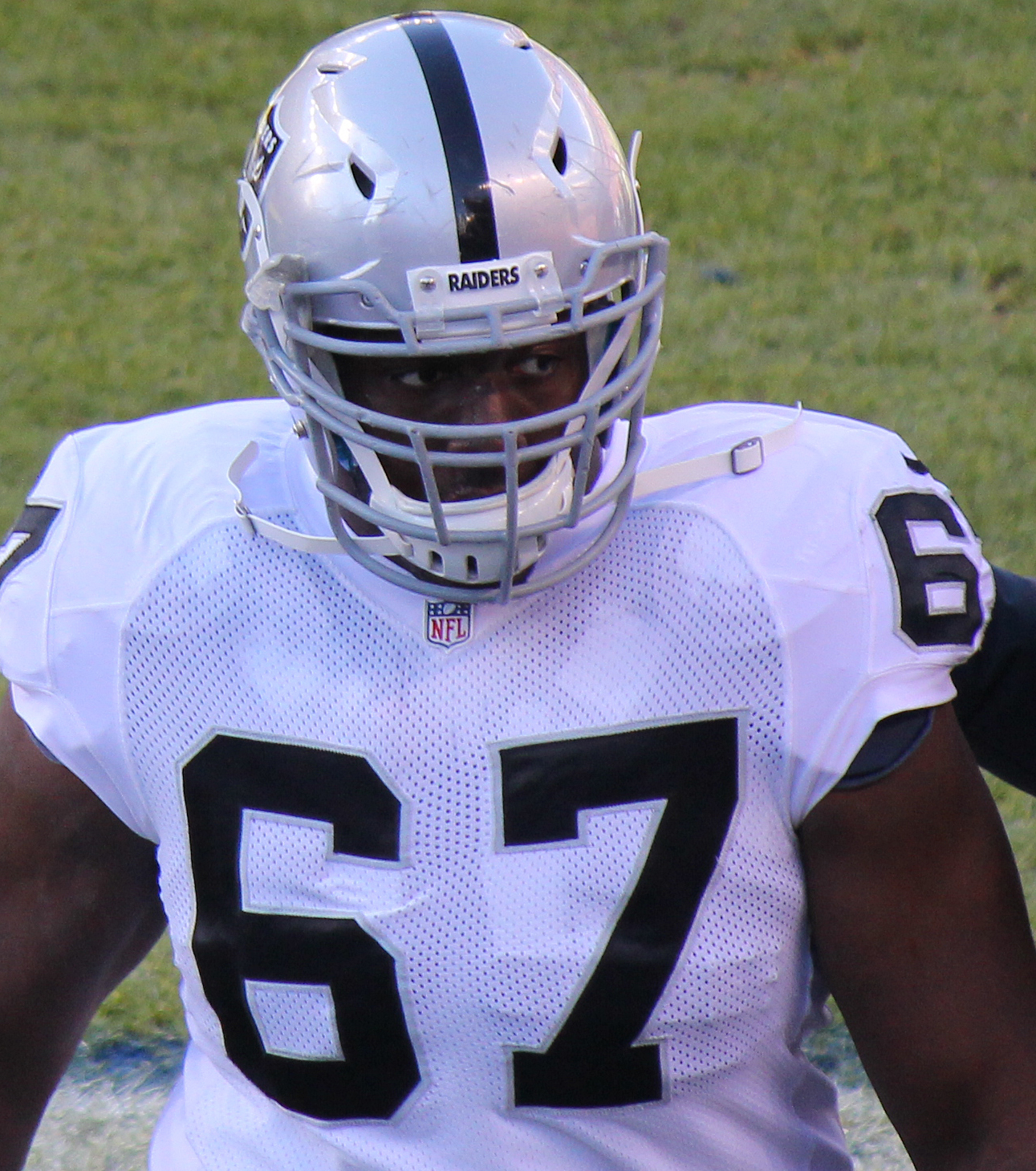
Kevin Boothe

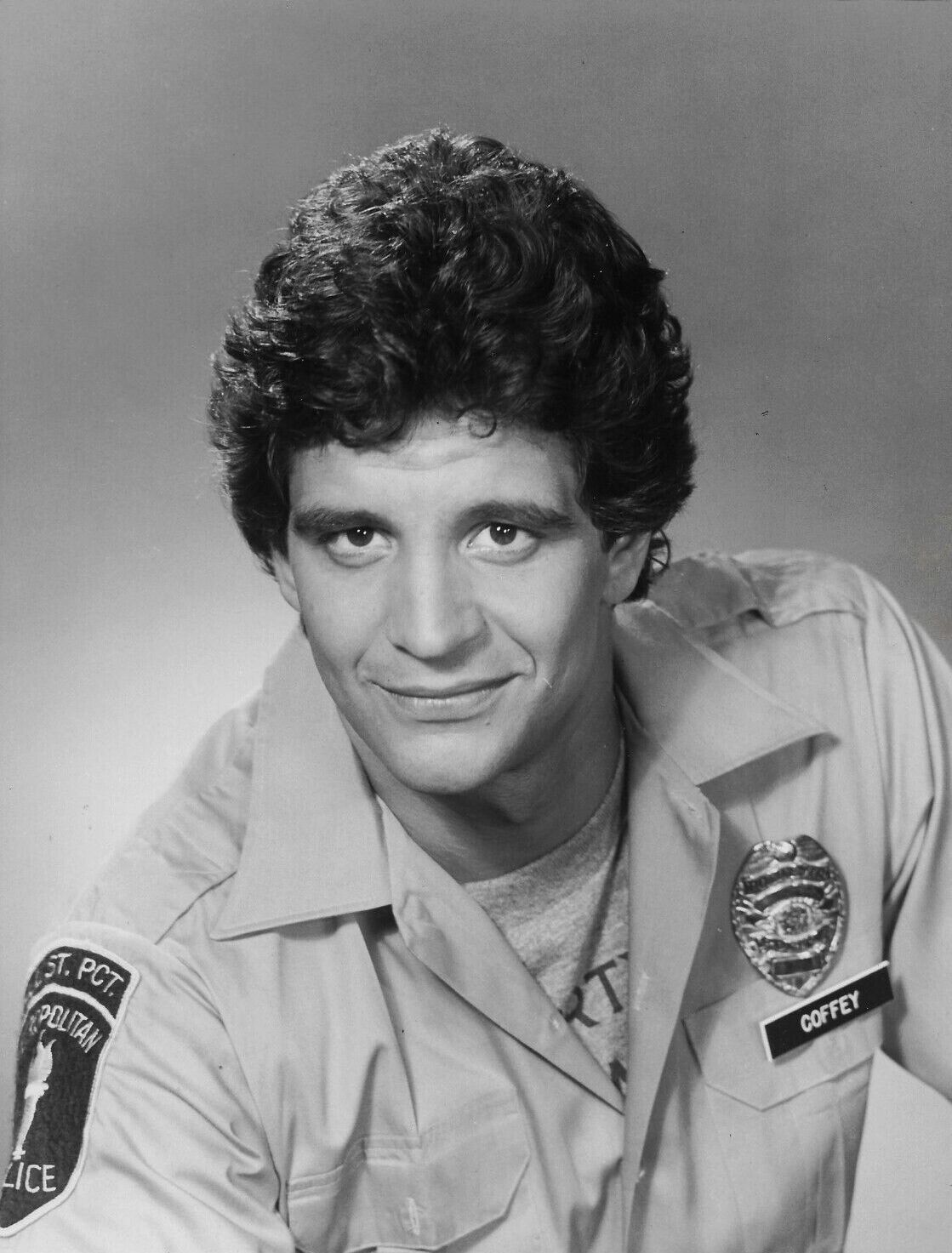
Ed Marinaro

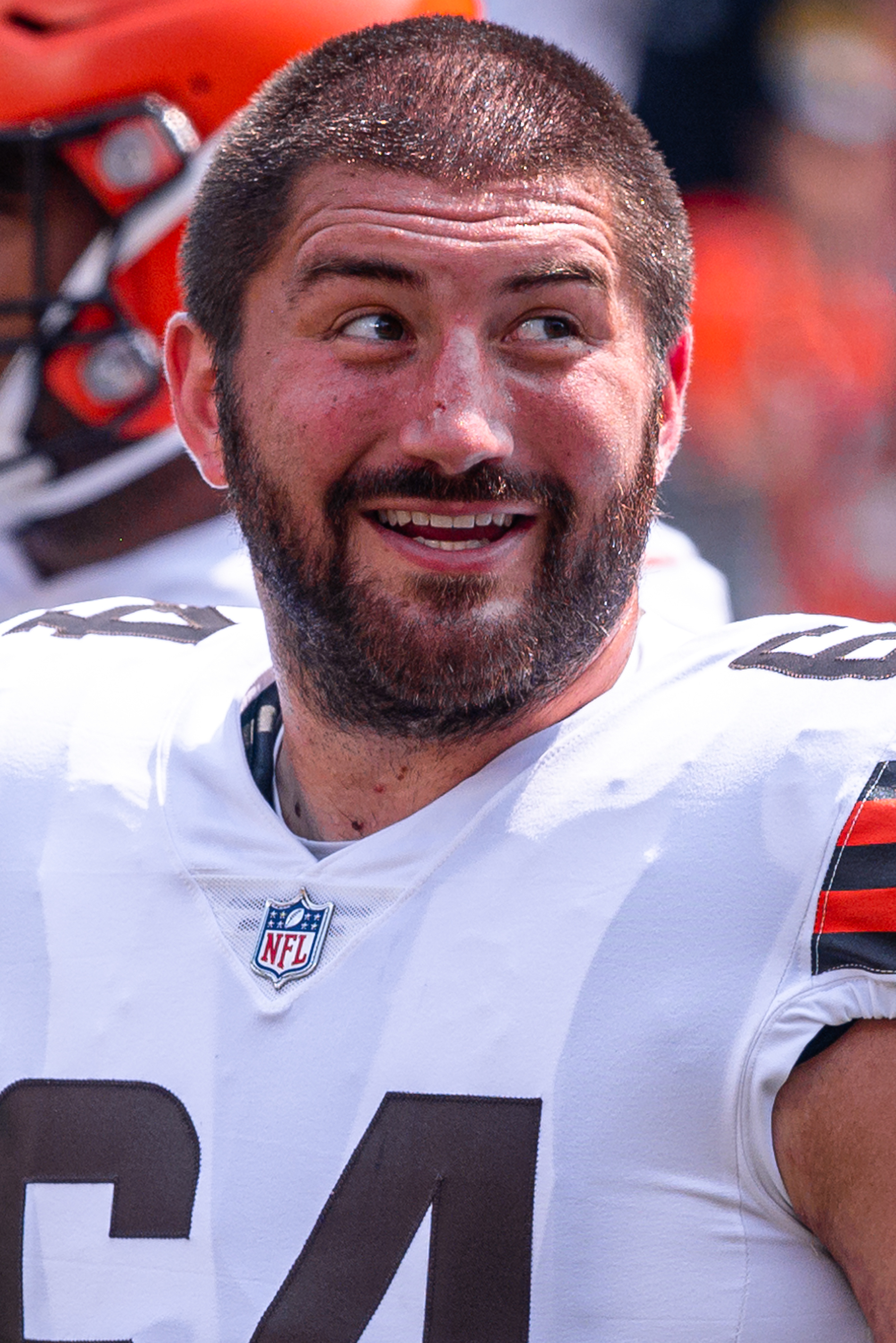
JC Tretter

The following Cornell Big Red football players have been selected by NFL teams in the annual NFL draft:

==== Key ====
B	Back	K	Kicker	NT	Nose tackle
C	Center	LB	Linebacker	FB	Fullback
DB	Defensive back	P	Punter	HB	Halfback
DE	Defensive end	QB	Quarterback	WR	Wide receiver
DT	Defensive tackle	RB	Running back	G	Guard
E	End	T	Offensive tackle	TE	Tight end

Year	Round	Pick in round	Overall pick	Player	Team	Position
2024	3		94	Jalyx Hunt^{a}	Philadelphia Eagles	LB
2024	5	24	159	Hunter Nourzad^{b}	Kansas City Chiefs	C
2013	4	25	122	JC Tretter	Green Bay Packers	T
2006	6	7	176	Kevin Boothe	Los Angeles Raiders	T
1997	4	18	114	Seth Payne	Jacksonville Jaguars	DT
1997	4	27	123	Chad Levitt	Oakland Raiders	RB
1984	9	24	248	Derrick Harmon	San Francisco 49ers	RB
1974	9	26	234	Bob Lally	Miami Dolphins	LB
1974	14	22	360	Mike Phillips	Cincinnati Bengals	T
1972	2	24	50	Ed Marinaro	Minnesota Vikings	RB
1969	10	23	257	John Sponheimer	Kansas City Chiefs	DT
1967	9	11	222	Pete Larson	Washington Redskins	RB
1964	8	11	109	Gary Wood	New York Giants	QB
1956	18	7	212	Stan Intihar	Green Bay Packers	E
1956	28	2	327	Bill DeGraaf	Pittsburgh Steelers	B
1955	13	3	148	Len Oniskey	Washington Redskins	T
1954	28	8	333	John Gerdes	Philadelphia Eagles	T
1951	26	4	307	Jeff Fleischmann	St. Louis Cardinals	B
1949	8	10	81	Bob Dean	Philadelphia Eagles	B
1949	18	6	177	Hillary Chollet	Los Angeles Rams	B
1949	25	3	244	Paul Girolamo	New York Yanks	B
1947	5	4	29	Frank Wydo	Pittsburgh Steelers	T
1946	9	2	72	Al Dekdebrun	New York Yanks	B
1946	25	6	236	Chick Davidson	Green Bay Packers	T
1945	22	4	223	Walt Kretz	New York Yanks	B
1945	22	7	226	Chick Davidson	Washington Redskins	T
1944	25	7	259	Joe Martin	Washington Redskins	B
1944	30	2	309	Howard Blose	Brooklyn Dodgers	B
1941	10	7	87	Walt Matuszczak	New York Giants	B
1941	11	4	94	Nick Drahos	Los Angeles Rams	T
1941	17	4	154	Kirk Hershey	Los Angeles Rams	E
1941	22	2	204	Mort Landsberg	Pittsburgh Steelers	B
1940	21	4	194	Vince Eichler	Green Bay Packers	B
1939	10	4	84	Bill McKeever	Philadelphia Eagles	T
1939	11	3	93	Sid Roth	Los Angeles Rams	G

^aHunt transferred to the Houston Christian Huskies in 2022
^bNourzad transferred to the Penn State Nittany Lions in 2022

Numerous undrafted players have also played in the NFL. Pete Gogolak became the first soccer-style kicker in pro football in 1964; the most recent is Jacksonville Jaguars wide receiver Bryan Walters.

=== Big Red Players in the Super Bowl ===
In 2025, Hunter Nourzad '22, playing for the Kansas City Chiefs and Jalyx Hunt '23, playing for the Philadelphia Eagles, faced each other in Super Bowl LIX. Derrick Harmon '84 returned kicks and rushed for 20 yards in Super Bowl XIX.

=== Others ===
- Arthur Fazzin was captain of the team during the early 1940s. He later became an actor and game show host under the stage name Art Fleming.

== Television ==
Cornell football, as well as the rest of the Ivy League Conference, currently has a deal with ESPN in which ESPN agreed to a long-term relationship to showcase Ivy League events through a variety of ESPN platforms, including at least 24 events annually on ESPN’s linear networks and more than 1,100 annually on ESPN+, one of ESPN's earliest conference partners after launching ESPN+.

== Future non-conference opponents ==
Announced schedules as of January 2, 2026.

2026	2027	2028
at Colgate	Colgate	at Colgate
at Georgetown		
Lehigh		

== See also ==
- List of Cornell Big Red football seasons
- List of Cornell Big Red in the NFL draft
