= Nick Drahos =

American football player (1918–2018)

Profile
- Positions: Tackle, end

Personal information
- Born: December 6, 1918; Ford City, Pennsylvania, U.S.
- Died: May 12, 2018 (aged 99); Holland, Michigan, U.S.

Career information
- College: Cornell University
- NFL draft: 1941: 11th round, 94th overall pick

Awards and highlights
- Unanimous All-American (1939); Consensus All-American (1940); 2× First-team All-Eastern (1939, 1940)
- College Football Hall of Fame

Nick Drahos (December 6, 1918 – May 12, 2018) was an American football end. He was selected 94th overall in the 11th round of the 1941 NFL draft. He played college football at Cornell University and was a member of the Sphinx Head Society. He was elected to the College Football Hall of Fame in 1981. Drahos died from pneumonia in Holland, Michigan in May 2018 at the age 99.
