= 1922 Franklin & Marshall Nevonians football team =

American college football season

1922 Franklin & Marshall Nevonians football
- Conference: Independent
- Record: 8–2
- Head coach: John B. Price (3rd season)
- Captain: J. Shober Barr

1922 Eastern college football independents records
	Conf.			Overall
Team	W	L	T	W		L		T
Cornell		–		8	–	0	–	0
Princeton		–		8	–	0	–	0
Army		–		8	–	0	–	2
Syracuse		–		6	–	1	–	2
Franklin & Marshall		–		8	–	2	–	0
Pittsburgh		–		8	–	2	–	0
Holy Cross		–		7	–	2	–	1
Harvard		–		7	–	2	–	0
Lafayette		–		7	–	2	–	0
Springfield		–		6	–	2	–	0
Boston College		–		6	–	2	–	1
Brown		–		6	–	2	–	1
Colgate		–		6	–	3	–	0
Dartmouth		–		6	–	3	–	0
Penn		–		6	–	3	–	0
Vermont		–		6	–	3	–	0
Washington & Jefferson		–		6	–	3	–	1
Yale		–		6	–	3	–	1
Bucknell		–		7	–	4	–	0
Penn State		–		6	–	4	–	1
Carnegie Tech		–		5	–	3	–	1
Villanova		–		5	–	3	–	1
Columbia		–		5	–	4	–	0
Rutgers		–		5	–	4	–	0
Tufts		–		5	–	4	–	0
Rhode Island State		–		4	–	4	–	0
NYU		–		4	–	5	–	0
Fordham		–		3	–	5	–	2
Geneva		–		4	–	6	–	0
Boston University		–		2	–	4	–	3
Lehigh		–		3	–	5	–	1
New Hampshire		–		3	–	5	–	1
Drexel		–		2	–	4	–	0
Temple		–		1	–	4	–	1
Buffalo		–		1	–	5	–	0
CCNY		–		1	–	6	–	0
Duquesne		–		0	–	8	–	0

The 1922 Franklin & Marshall Nevonians football team was an American football team that represented Franklin & Marshall College as an independent during the 1922 college football season. In its third season under head coach John B. Price, the team compiled an 8–2 record, shut out six of ten opponents, and outscored all opponents by a total of 279 to 32. Key players included fullbacks Doc Cragin and Briggs Kingsley. The team played its home games on Williamson Field in Lancaster, Pennsylvania.

== Schedule ==
Date	Opponent	Site	Result	Source
September 23	Albright	Williamson Field; Lancaster, PA	W 23–2	
September 30	at Penn	Franklin Field; Philadelphia, PA	L 0–14	
October 7	Western Maryland	Williamson Field; Lancaster, PA	W 31–0	
October 14	Mount St. Mary's	Williamson Field; Lancaster, PA	W 48–0	
October 21	at Dickinson	Biddle Field; Carlisle, PA (rivalry)	L 7–13	
October 28	Haverford	Williamson Field; Lancaster, PA	W 61–0	
November 4	at Pennsylvania Military	Chester, PA	W 42–0	
November 11	Swarthmore	Williamson Field; Lancaster, PA (rivalry)	W 19–0	
November 18	at Ursinus	Collegeville, PA	W 42–0	
November 30	Gettysburg	Williamson Field; Lancaster, PA (rivalry)	W 6–3	
