= 1922 Maine Black Bears football team =

American college football season

1922 Maine Black Bears football

Maine champion MIAA champion
- Conference: Maine Intercollegiate Athletic Association
- Record: 6–2 (3–0 MIAA)
- Head coach: Fred Brice (2nd season)
- Captain: Raymond Lunge
- Home stadium: Alumni Field

The 1922 Maine Black Bears football team was an American football team that represented the University of Maine during the 1922 college football season. In its second season under head coach Fred Brice, the team compiled a 6–2 record and was recognized as the Maine state champion. The team played its home games at Alumni Field in Orono, Maine. Raymond Lunge was the team captain.

== Schedule ==
Date	Opponent	Site	Result	Attendance	Source
September 23	Connecticut*	Alumni Field; Orono, ME	W 14–0		
September 30	Vermont*	Alumni Field; Orono, ME	L 0–7		
October 7	at Dartmouth*	Hanover, NH	L 0–19		
October 14	Norwich*	Alumni Field; Orono, ME	W 12–0		
October 21	Bates	Alumni Field; Orono, ME	W 19–6		
October 28	Colby	Alumni Field; Orono, ME	W 14–0	5,000	
November 4	at Bowdoin	Whittier Field; Brunswick, ME	W 7–6		
November 11	at New Hampshire*	Textile Field; Manchester, NH (rivalry)	W 14–7		
*Non-conference game
