= Robert Park (American football) =

American football player and coach (1880–1961)

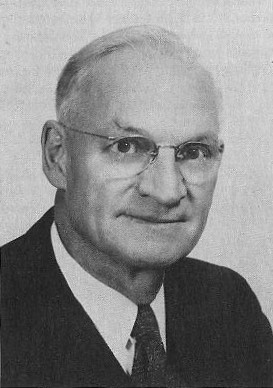
- Park in 1951

Biographical details
- Born: May 12, 1880; Rome, New York, U.S.
- Died: November 22, 1961 (aged 81); Beaver Falls, Pennsylvania, U.S.

Playing career
- 1901–1904: Syracuse

Coaching career (HC unless noted)
- 1922: Geneva

Head coaching record
- Overall: 4–6

Robert Park (May 12, 1880 – November 22, 1961) was an American college football coach. He was the tenth head football coach at Geneva College in Beaver Falls, Pennsylvania, serving for one season, in 1922, and compiling a record of 4–6. He also coached other sports for many years. He was best known for his work as an academic and a minister of the Reformed Presbyterian Church of North America (RPCNA).

== Career ==
Born in Rome, New York on May 12, 1880, Park attended the city schools of Syracuse and graduated from Syracuse University, where he was the captain of the football team in 1905. He was also a member of the men's crew from 1902 to 1905. After graduation, he studied at the Reformed Presbyterian Theological Seminary (RPTS) from 1907 to 1910. Licensed by the Rochester Presbytery on May 4, 1909, he was ordained to the ministry by the Pittsburgh Presbytery and installed as pastor of the denomination's Parnassus congregation on November 11, 1910. Park remained pastor of the congregation until August 28, 1922, when he resigned to serve at Geneva.

While Park was the head of the history department at Geneva, he was also a longtime sports coach. He coached the football team in 1922, the cross country team from 1926 to 1928, and the track team from 1929 to 1949. He was also the dean of the college and the chairman of the Bible Department from 1949 until 1955. Park continued to serve his church, being chairman of various committees and sitting on the boards of both Geneva College and RPTS. In 1929, he was elected the church history professor at RPTS. Park continued his schooling after beginning his professorship, earning an M.A. from the University of Pittsburgh in 1924 and eventually earning a PhD. He was recognized for his accomplishments later in life, being elected the moderator of the Synod of the RPCNA in 1951, and receiving a D.D. from Syracuse University in 1934.

Beginning in 1929 and continuing until his death, Park spent his summers pastoring at the Reformed Presbyterian congregation in Cornwallis, Nova Scotia.

== Family ==
Park was born into an Irish family. His father and mother were natives of County Tyrone and County Cavan respectively. Park married the late Emma Dodd on July 23, 1907, while teaching at the Arkansas Military Academy in Little Rock, between his college and seminary careers. He had three sons with her, Robert, David, and James. After her death in Beaver Falls in 1939, he married the late Jennie Hayes on December 31, 1940, by whom he had two more sons, John and Eric. They were married until his death in Beaver Falls on November 22, 1961. Park is buried in Syracuse.

== Head coaching record ==
=== Football ===
Year	Team	Overall	Conference	Standing	Bowl/playoffs
Geneva Covenanters (Independent) (1922)
1922	Geneva	4–6			
Geneva:		4–6			
Total:		4–6			
