= 1922 Harvard Crimson football team =

American college football season

1922 Harvard Crimson football
- Conference: Independent
- Record: 7–2
- Head coach: Bob Fisher (4th season)
- Home stadium: Harvard Stadium

1922 Eastern college football independents records
	Conf.			Overall
Team	W	L	T	W		L		T
Cornell		–		8	–	0	–	0
Princeton		–		8	–	0	–	0
Army		–		8	–	0	–	2
Syracuse		–		6	–	1	–	2
Franklin & Marshall		–		8	–	2	–	0
Pittsburgh		–		8	–	2	–	0
Holy Cross		–		7	–	2	–	1
Harvard		–		7	–	2	–	0
Lafayette		–		7	–	2	–	0
Springfield		–		6	–	2	–	0
Boston College		–		6	–	2	–	1
Brown		–		6	–	2	–	1
Colgate		–		6	–	3	–	0
Dartmouth		–		6	–	3	–	0
Penn		–		6	–	3	–	0
Vermont		–		6	–	3	–	0
Washington & Jefferson		–		6	–	3	–	1
Yale		–		6	–	3	–	1
Bucknell		–		7	–	4	–	0
Penn State		–		6	–	4	–	1
Carnegie Tech		–		5	–	3	–	1
Villanova		–		5	–	3	–	1
Columbia		–		5	–	4	–	0
Rutgers		–		5	–	4	–	0
Tufts		–		5	–	4	–	0
Rhode Island State		–		4	–	4	–	0
NYU		–		4	–	5	–	0
Fordham		–		3	–	5	–	2
Geneva		–		4	–	6	–	0
Boston University		–		2	–	4	–	3
Lehigh		–		3	–	5	–	1
New Hampshire		–		3	–	5	–	1
Drexel		–		2	–	4	–	0
Temple		–		1	–	4	–	1
Buffalo		–		1	–	5	–	0
CCNY		–		1	–	6	–	0
Duquesne		–		0	–	8	–	0

The 1922 Harvard Crimson football team represented Harvard University in the 1922 college football season. The Crimson finished with a 7–2 record under fourth-year head coach Bob Fisher. Walter Camp selected one Harvard player, guard Charles J. Hubbard, as a first-team member of his 1922 College Football All-America Team. Halfback George Owen was selected by Camp as a second-team All-American and was later inducted into the College Football Hall of Fame.

== Schedule ==
Date	Time	Opponent	Site	Result	Attendance	Source
September 30		Middlebury	Harvard Stadium; Boston, MA	W 20–0		
October 7		Holy Cross	Harvard Stadium; Boston, MA	W 20–0		
October 14		Bowdoin	Harvard Stadium; Boston, MA	W 15–0		
October 21		Centre	Harvard Stadium; Boston, MA	W 24–10	50,000	
October 28		Dartmouth	Harvard Stadium; Boston, MA (rivalry)	W 12–3		
November 4		Florida	Harvard Stadium; Boston, MA	W 24–0	30,000	
November 11		Princeton	Harvard Stadium; Boston, MA (rivalry)	L 3–10	52,000	
November 18	2:00 p.m.	Brown	Harvard Stadium; Boston, MA	L 0–3	30,000	
November 25		at Yale	Yale Bowl; New Haven, CT (rivalry)	W 10–3	78,000	
All times are in Eastern time
