= Harvey Emery =

Biographical details
- Born: June 25, 1902; Hoboken, New Jersey, U.S.
- Died: February 1979 (aged 76); New Jersey, U.S.

Accomplishments and honors

Championships
- National (1922)

Harvey Charles Emery (June 25, 1902 – February 1979) was an athlete, American football coach, and banker. He was a three-sport athlete at Princeton University in the early 1920s and serves as an assistant athletic director and assistant football coach at the University of Michigan in the 1920s and 1930s. He later had a career in banking, serving as chairman of the board and chief executive officer of the First Trenton National Bank in Trenton, New Jersey.

== Early years ==
Emery was born in Hoboken, New Jersey, and grew up in Manhattan, New York City. His father was the superintendent of the Marine Division of the Lackawanna Railroad. Emery attended preparatory school at Exeter in New Hampshire.

== Princeton ==
While attending Princeton University, he was a member of the football, track and wrestling teams. He played at the tackle position for the football team and competed in the hammer throw and discus events. He was also chosen as the captain of the track and wrestling teams, president of Princeton's Class of 1924, Chairman of the Senior Council, and president of the Philadelphia Society and the campus Y.M.C.A. Upon graduating from Princeton in 1924, Emery was also selected by his classmates as the "best all-around man," the "most respected," the "best all-around athlete," the "most popular," and the "busiest." Sports writer Lawrence Perry described him as "one of the highest type of college athlete, mentally, physically, and morally who has ever come out of a college."

== Michigan ==
After graduating from Princeton in 1924, Emery was recruited to coach at the University of Michigan by athletic director Fielding H. Yost. He served as an assistant athletic director and also as an assistant football coach, with principal responsibility for linemen, under head coaches George Little in 1924, Fielding H. Yost in 1926, and Harry Kipke starting in 1929. In 1926, a newspaper profile of Emery described him as Michigan's "promulgator of mental poise and spiritual uplift."

== Family and later years ==
In 1925, Emery took the year off from coach and toured the world. In August 1925, he was married in Peking, China, to Mary Carter, the daughter of the director of the Peking Union Medical College. Emery and his wife had a daughter, Julie Tweedale Emery, who was married in 1956 to Bayard Henry. They also had a son John Matthew Emery II.

After retiring from athletic coaching and administration, Emery had a career in banking. He served as a vice president at the Banker's Trust Company of New York and later as the chairman of the board and chief executive officer of the First Trenton National Bank in Trenton, New Jersey. In 1959, he also became a director of Applied Science Corporation, an electronic research and manufacturing company specializing in telemetry and data processing. He also served as the president of the Phillips Exeter Academy Alumni Association in the late 1940s.
