= 1922 Villanova Wildcats football team =

American college football season

1922 Villanova Wildcats football
- Conference: Independent
- Record: 5–3–1
- Head coach: Allie Miller (2nd season)
- Captain: William Cronin
- Home stadium: Villanova Field

1922 Eastern college football independents records
	Conf.			Overall
Team	W	L	T	W		L		T
Cornell		–		8	–	0	–	0
Princeton		–		8	–	0	–	0
Army		–		8	–	0	–	2
Syracuse		–		6	–	1	–	2
Franklin & Marshall		–		8	–	2	–	0
Pittsburgh		–		8	–	2	–	0
Holy Cross		–		7	–	2	–	1
Harvard		–		7	–	2	–	0
Lafayette		–		7	–	2	–	0
Springfield		–		6	–	2	–	0
Boston College		–		6	–	2	–	1
Brown		–		6	–	2	–	1
Colgate		–		6	–	3	–	0
Dartmouth		–		6	–	3	–	0
Penn		–		6	–	3	–	0
Vermont		–		6	–	3	–	0
Washington & Jefferson		–		6	–	3	–	1
Yale		–		6	–	3	–	1
Bucknell		–		7	–	4	–	0
Penn State		–		6	–	4	–	1
Carnegie Tech		–		5	–	3	–	1
Villanova		–		5	–	3	–	1
Columbia		–		5	–	4	–	0
Rutgers		–		5	–	4	–	0
Tufts		–		5	–	4	–	0
Rhode Island State		–		4	–	4	–	0
NYU		–		4	–	5	–	0
Fordham		–		3	–	5	–	2
Geneva		–		4	–	6	–	0
Boston University		–		2	–	4	–	3
Lehigh		–		3	–	5	–	1
New Hampshire		–		3	–	5	–	1
Drexel		–		2	–	4	–	0
Temple		–		1	–	4	–	1
Buffalo		–		1	–	5	–	0
CCNY		–		1	–	6	–	0
Duquesne		–		0	–	8	–	0

The 1922 Villanova Wildcats football team represented the Villanova University during the 1922 college football season. The Wildcats team captain was William Cronin.

== Schedule ==
Date	Time	Opponent	Site	Result	Attendance	Source
September 30		Western Maryland	Villanova, PA	W 15–0		
October 7	3:00 p.m.	Third Army Corps	Villanova Field; Villanova, PA	T 0–0	500	
October 14		at Holy Cross	Fitton Field; Worcester, MA	L 0–14		
October 21		Catholic University	Villanova, PA	W 14–6		
October 28		at Gettysburg	York, PA	L 7–15		
November 4	2:00 p.m.	at Boston College	Braves Field; Boston, MA	L 3–15		
November 11		at Muhlenberg	Allentown, PA	W 16–6		
November 18		at Mount St. Mary's	Emmitsburg, MD	W 2–0		
November 25		vs. Duquesne	Philadelphia, PA	W 10–0		
All times are in Eastern time
