= 1922 Connecticut Aggies football team =

American college football season

1922 Connecticut Aggies football
- Conference: Athletic League of New England State Colleges
- Record: 2–6–1 (0–3 New England)
- Head coach: J. Wilder Tasker (2nd season)
- Captain: Maurice F. Daly
- Home stadium: Gardner Dow Athletic Fields

The 1922 Connecticut Aggies football team represented Connecticut Agricultural College, now the University of Connecticut, in the 1922 college football season. The Aggies were led by second-year head coach J. Wilder Tasker, and completed the season with a record of 2–6–1.

== Schedule ==
Date	Opponent	Site	Result	Source
September 23	at Maine	Orono, ME	L 0–14	
September 30	at Tufts*	Medford, MA	L 0–13	
October 7	at Massachusetts	Alumni Field; Amherst, MA (rivalry)	L 6–13	
October 14	at Springfield*	Pratt Field; Springfield, MA	L 7–24	
October 21	at Trinity (CT)*	Trinity Field; Hartford, CT	W 19–7	
October 28	at Worcester Tech*	Worcester, MA	W 26–3	
November 4	Providence*	Gardner Dow Athletic Fields; Storrs, CT	L 0–10	
October 11	St. Stephen's (NY)*	Gardner Dow Athletic Fields; Storrs, CT	T 12–12	
November 18	Rhode Island State	Gardner Dow Athletic Fields; Storrs, CT (rivalry)	L 7–12	
*Non-conference game
