= 1922 Boston University football team =

American college football season

1922 Boston University football
- Conference: Independent
- Record: 2–4–3
- Head coach: Charles Whelan (2nd season)

1922 Eastern college football independents records
	Conf.			Overall
Team	W	L	T	W		L		T
Cornell		–		8	–	0	–	0
Princeton		–		8	–	0	–	0
Army		–		8	–	0	–	2
Syracuse		–		6	–	1	–	2
Franklin & Marshall		–		8	–	2	–	0
Pittsburgh		–		8	–	2	–	0
Holy Cross		–		7	–	2	–	1
Harvard		–		7	–	2	–	0
Lafayette		–		7	–	2	–	0
Springfield		–		6	–	2	–	0
Boston College		–		6	–	2	–	1
Brown		–		6	–	2	–	1
Colgate		–		6	–	3	–	0
Dartmouth		–		6	–	3	–	0
Penn		–		6	–	3	–	0
Vermont		–		6	–	3	–	0
Washington & Jefferson		–		6	–	3	–	1
Yale		–		6	–	3	–	1
Bucknell		–		7	–	4	–	0
Penn State		–		6	–	4	–	1
Carnegie Tech		–		5	–	3	–	1
Villanova		–		5	–	3	–	1
Columbia		–		5	–	4	–	0
Rutgers		–		5	–	4	–	0
Tufts		–		5	–	4	–	0
Rhode Island State		–		4	–	4	–	0
NYU		–		4	–	5	–	0
Fordham		–		3	–	5	–	2
Geneva		–		4	–	6	–	0
Boston University		–		2	–	4	–	3
Lehigh		–		3	–	5	–	1
New Hampshire		–		3	–	5	–	1
Drexel		–		2	–	4	–	0
Temple		–		1	–	4	–	1
Buffalo		–		1	–	5	–	0
CCNY		–		1	–	6	–	0
Duquesne		–		0	–	8	–	0

The 1922 Boston University football team was an American football team that represented Boston University as an independent during the 1922 college football season. In its second season under head coach Charles Whelan, the team compiled a 2–4–3 record and was outscored by a total of 76 to 63.

== Schedule ==
Date	Time	Opponent	Site	Result	Attendance	Source
September 30		at Colby	Waterville, ME	T 3–3		
October 7	3:00 p.m.	at Boston College	Braves Field; Boston, MA (rivalry)	L 6–20		
October 14		at Vermont	Centennial Field; Burlington, VT	L 7–0		
October 21		at Holy Cross	Fitton Field; Worcester, MA	T 7–7		
October 28		at Brown	Providence, RI	L 6–16		
November 4		at Dartmouth	Memorial Field; Hanover, NH	L 7–10		
November 11		at Providence	Hendricken Field; Providence, RI	W 7–0		
November 18		at New Hampshire	Memorial Field; Durham, NH	T 13–13		
November 25		at Tufts	Tufts Oval; Medford, MA	W 14–0	6,000	
All times are in Eastern time
