= Maurice F. Daly =

American football player (died 1945)

portrait of Daly, circa 1927

Maurice F. "Moe" Daly was and American football player and United States Army Air Forces colonel. A star athlete at Connecticut Agricultural College (today known as the "University of Connecticut") and at the United States Military Academy, he played for both schools' football teams and subsequently coached Army's team. Daly was captured as a prisoner of war by the Japanese at the end of the Battle of Bataan. Daly died as a prisoner on 21 January 1945.

== Early life ==
Daly grew up in Hartford, Connecticut. He had two brothers and a sister. His brother John J. Daly was, like him, an athletic star at Connecticut Agricultural College (the University of Connecticut). His other brother, James M. Daly, was a graduate of United States Naval Academy.

Daly graduated high school at the Hartford Public High School, having graduated with strong grades. He had not competed in sports while in high school.

== College sports ==
Daly with the Army Cadets in 1924

Daly with the Army Cadets in 1926

=== Connecticut ===
Daly had a noteworthy college football career in the early 1920s on the Connecticut Agricultural College football team, being a star player of the team.

While attending the Connecticut Agricultural College (today known as the "University of Connecticut", Daly began to take an interest in playing sports. In his freshman year during the fall semester of 1919, Daly attempted to join the school's athletic teams. Since the school lacked freshman teams, he had to compete with varsity athletes for a spot on the teams. While he practiced with the football team in scrimmages, he did not make the team. The next year, he made its 1920 football squad. He weighed 180 pounds (82 kg) player, and was positioned at fullback. In his first season, he was a consistently strong player, regularly gaining yardage on offense, and intercepting and tackling on the defense. During the team's 1921 season, he was their star fullback. At the end of that season, he was voted by his teammates to be the team's captain the following year (its 1922 season). Daly graduated in 1923.

=== Army West Point ===
Daly later played for the Army Cadets football team while attending the United States Military Academy (West Point). During the with the team's 1924 season, he played halfback and was regarded to be one of the best players on any Eastern United States college team. During the team's 1926 season, Daly played center.

Daly was Army's center for the entirety of the 1926 Army–Navy Game, a game which is considered the greatest Army–Navy Game and one of the greatest in the history of college football.

While at West Point, Daly was also a star player for the Army's basketball, ice hockey, and lacrosse teams. He was highly successful in all four sports he competed in for Army. In his senior year at West Point, Daly was awarded the Army Athletic Association saber.

== College football coaching career ==
Daly became a member of the West Point football coaching staff.

== Military service ==
A colonel in the United States Army Air Forces, Daly served during World War II.

Daly was stationed at Clark Air Base in The Philippines when it was attacked by Japanese forces on 8 December, 1941 (one day after the Attack on Pearl Harbor). He participated in the defense of the base that day. However, he was taken prisoner in April 1942 when the American forces lost the Battle of Bataan.

Daly died in captivity. Per the account of the Japanese military, Daly died of acute colitis on 21 January 1945 while a prisoner of war aboard a Japanese prison ship. World of his death was not received by his family until September. He was 44 years old.
