= 1922 Army Cadets football team =

American college football season

1922 Army Cadets football
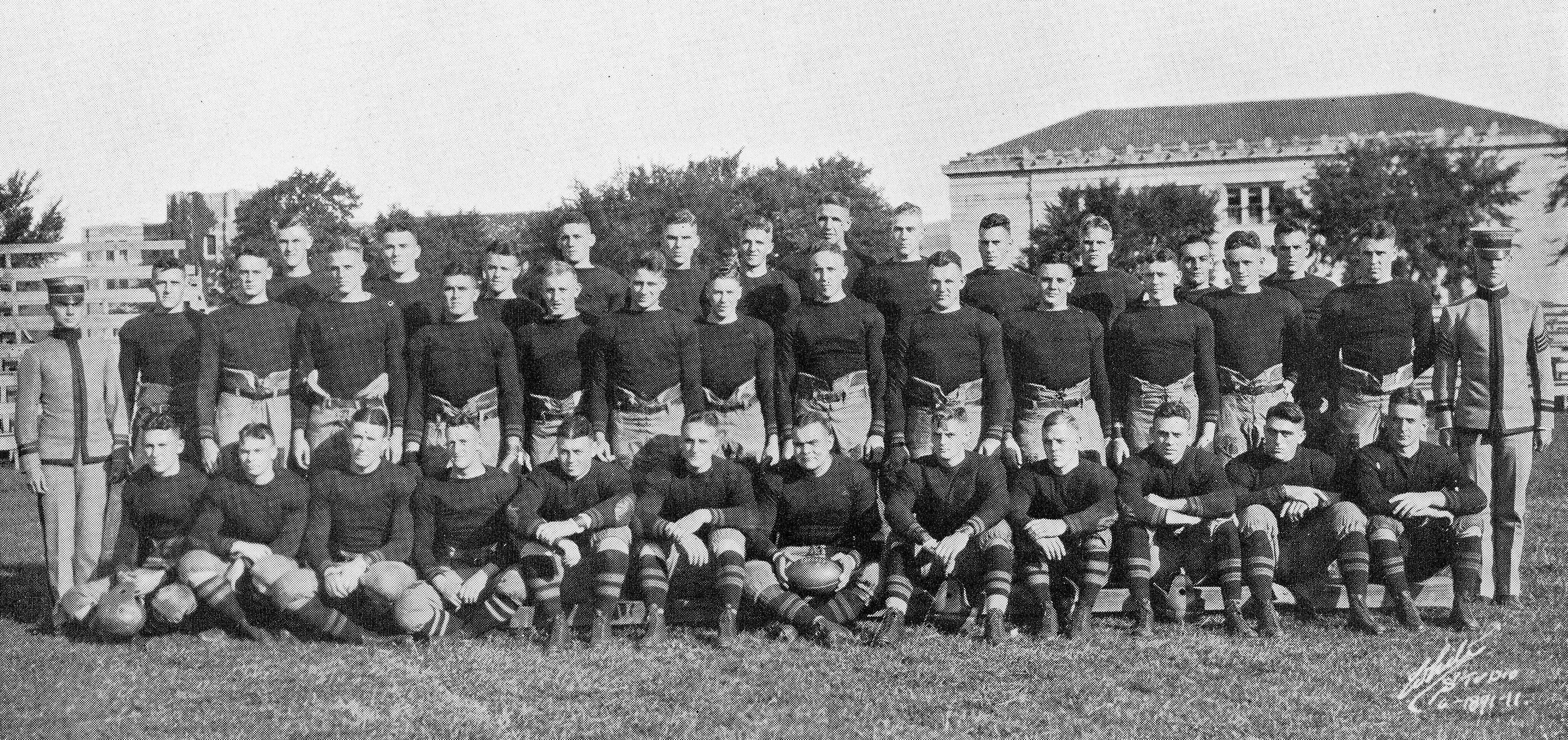
- Conference: Independent
- Record: 8–0–2
- Head coach: Charles Dudley Daly (8th season)
- Captain: Fritz Breidster
- Home stadium: The Plain

Uniform
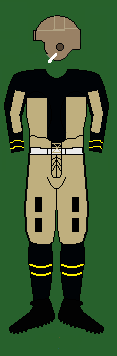

1922 Eastern college football independents records
	Conf.			Overall
Team	W	L	T	W		L		T
Cornell		–		8	–	0	–	0
Princeton		–		8	–	0	–	0
Army		–		8	–	0	–	2
Syracuse		–		6	–	1	–	2
Franklin & Marshall		–		8	–	2	–	0
Pittsburgh		–		8	–	2	–	0
Holy Cross		–		7	–	2	–	1
Harvard		–		7	–	2	–	0
Lafayette		–		7	–	2	–	0
Springfield		–		6	–	2	–	0
Boston College		–		6	–	2	–	1
Brown		–		6	–	2	–	1
Colgate		–		6	–	3	–	0
Dartmouth		–		6	–	3	–	0
Penn		–		6	–	3	–	0
Vermont		–		6	–	3	–	0
Washington & Jefferson		–		6	–	3	–	1
Yale		–		6	–	3	–	1
Bucknell		–		7	–	4	–	0
Penn State		–		6	–	4	–	1
Carnegie Tech		–		5	–	3	–	1
Villanova		–		5	–	3	–	1
Columbia		–		5	–	4	–	0
Rutgers		–		5	–	4	–	0
Tufts		–		5	–	4	–	0
Rhode Island State		–		4	–	4	–	0
NYU		–		4	–	5	–	0
Fordham		–		3	–	5	–	2
Geneva		–		4	–	6	–	0
Boston University		–		2	–	4	–	3
Lehigh		–		3	–	5	–	1
New Hampshire		–		3	–	5	–	1
Drexel		–		2	–	4	–	0
Temple		–		1	–	4	–	1
Buffalo		–		1	–	5	–	0
CCNY		–		1	–	6	–	0
Duquesne		–		0	–	8	–	0

The 1922 Army Cadets football team represented the United States Military Academy as an independent during the 1922 college football season. In their eighth season under head coach Charles Dudley Daly, the Cadets compiled a 8–0–2 record, shut out seven of their ten opponents, and outscored all opponents by a combined total of 228 to 27, an average of 22.8 points scored and 2.7 points allowed. In the annual Army–Navy Game, the Cadets defeated the Midshipmen 17–14.

Two Army players were recognized as first-team players on the All-America team: guard Fritz Breidster and center Edgar Garbisch. Garbisch was later inducted into the College Football Hall of Fame.

== Schedule ==
Date	Opponent	Site	Result	Attendance	Source
September 30	Springfield	The Plain; West Point, NY	W 35–0		
September 30	Lebanon Valley	The Plain; West Point, NY	W 12–0		
October 7	Kansas	The Plain; West Point, NY	W 13–0		
October 14	Auburn	The Plain; West Point, NY	W 19–6		
October 21	New Hampshire	The Plain; West Point, NY	W 33–0		
October 28	at Yale	Yale Bowl; New Haven, CT	T 7–7	77,000	
November 4	St. Bonaventure	The Plain; West Point, NY	W 53–0		
November 11	Notre Dame	The Plain; West Point, NY (rivalry)	T 0–0	15,000	
November 18	Bates	The Plain; West Point, NY	W 39–0		
November 25	vs. Navy	Franklin Field; Philadelphia, PA (Army–Navy Game)	W 17–14		

== Players ==
Army's first-string players started only six games, against the Springfield YMCA, Kansas, Auburn, Yale, Notre Dame, and Navy. The following individuals were starters in at least two of those six games.

- Fritz Breidster - started 5 games at left guard, 1 game at right guard
- Francis Dodd - started 3 games at right halfback
- August W. Farwick - started 1 game at right tackle, 1 game at left guard, 4 games at right guard
- Edgar Garbisch - started 5 games at center
- Sanford J. Goodman - started 2 games at left tackle, 4 games at right tackle
- Charles W. Lawrence - started 1 game at right halfback, 1 game at left halfback
- Dennis J. Mulligan - started 1 game at right tackle, 4 games at left tackle
- Charles T. Myers - started 3 games at left end, 2 games at right end
- George Winfered Smythe - started 6 games at quarterback
- Patrick W. Timberlake - started 5 games at left halfback
- Washington M. Ives - started 2 game at right halfback
- Walter C. White - started 2 games at left end, 3 games at right end
- William H. Wood - started 6 games at fullback
