= Jonathan K. Miller =

American football player and coach (1899–1971)

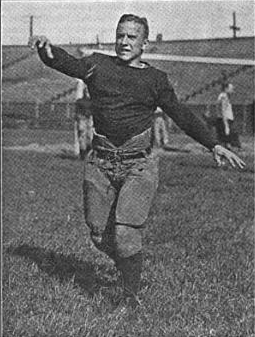

Biographical details
- Born: December 26, 1899; Pottsville, Pennsylvania, U.S.
- Died: August 22, 1971 (aged 71); Drexel Hill, Pennsylvania, U.S.

Playing career

Football
- 1920–1922: Penn

Basketball
- 1920–1923: Penn

Baseball
- 1923: Penn
- Positions: Quarterback (football); Guard (basketball); Outfielder (baseball)

Coaching career (HC unless noted)

Football
- 1923–1927: Penn (assistant)
- 1928–1930: Franklin & Marshall
- 1931–1937: Penn (backfield)

Basketball
- 1923–1928: Penn (assistant)

Head coaching record
- Overall: 15–11–1

Jonathan Kieser "Poss" Miller (December 26, 1899 – August 22, 1971) was an American football player and coach. He played college football at the University of Pennsylvania as a quarterback, captaining the 1922 Penn Quakers football team. Miller served as the head football coach at Franklin & Marshall College from 1928 to 1930, compiling a record of 15–11–1.

== Early life and playing career ==
Miller was born on December 26, 1899, in Pottsville, Pennsylvania, to Jonathan P. and Carrie E. (Krieser) Miller. He attended Lebanon High School in Lebanon, Pennsylvania, where he participated in football, basketball, and track.

Miller played college football as a quarterback at the University of Pennsylvania from 1920 to 1922 under coach John Heisman. He was the captain of the 1922 Penn Quakers football team. At Penn, Miller also played basketball as a guard and baseball as an outfielder.

Miller also played the last five games of the 1923 football season for the Frankford Yellow Jackets alongside his brother, Heinie.

== Coaching career ==
After graduating from Penn in 1923, Miller joined football coaching staff of his alma mater. He also practiced as a dentist, with offices in West Philadelphia. Miller served as the head football coach at Franklin & Marshall College in Lancaster, Pennsylvania for three seasons, from 1928 to 1930, compiling a record of 15–11–1.

== Death ==
Miller died at the age of 71, on August 22, 1971, at Delaware County Memorial Hospital in Drexel Hill, Pennsylvania. He was buried at Arlington Cemetery in Drexel Hill.

== Head coaching record ==
Year	Team	Overall	Conference	Standing	Bowl/playoffs
Franklin & Marshall (Eastern Pennsylvania Collegiate Conference) (1928–1930)
1928	Franklin & Marshall	4–5	1–3	T–4th	
1929	Franklin & Marshall	6–3	3–1	2nd	
1930	Franklin & Marshall	5–3–1	2–1–1	T–2nd	
Franklin & Marshall:		15–11–1	6–5–1		
Total:		15–11–1			
