= 1922 Penn Quakers football team =

American college football season

1922 Penn Quakers football
- Conference: Independent
- Record: 6–3
- Head coach: John Heisman (3rd season)
- Offensive scheme: Jump shift
- Captain: Jonathan K. Miller
- Home stadium: Franklin Field

1922 Eastern college football independents records
	Conf.			Overall
Team	W	L	T	W		L		T
Cornell		–		8	–	0	–	0
Princeton		–		8	–	0	–	0
Army		–		8	–	0	–	2
Syracuse		–		6	–	1	–	2
Franklin & Marshall		–		8	–	2	–	0
Pittsburgh		–		8	–	2	–	0
Holy Cross		–		7	–	2	–	1
Harvard		–		7	–	2	–	0
Lafayette		–		7	–	2	–	0
Springfield		–		6	–	2	–	0
Boston College		–		6	–	2	–	1
Brown		–		6	–	2	–	1
Colgate		–		6	–	3	–	0
Dartmouth		–		6	–	3	–	0
Penn		–		6	–	3	–	0
Vermont		–		6	–	3	–	0
Washington & Jefferson		–		6	–	3	–	1
Yale		–		6	–	3	–	1
Bucknell		–		7	–	4	–	0
Penn State		–		6	–	4	–	1
Carnegie Tech		–		5	–	3	–	1
Villanova		–		5	–	3	–	1
Columbia		–		5	–	4	–	0
Rutgers		–		5	–	4	–	0
Tufts		–		5	–	4	–	0
Rhode Island State		–		4	–	4	–	0
NYU		–		4	–	5	–	0
Fordham		–		3	–	5	–	2
Geneva		–		4	–	6	–	0
Boston University		–		2	–	4	–	3
Lehigh		–		3	–	5	–	1
New Hampshire		–		3	–	5	–	1
Drexel		–		2	–	4	–	0
Temple		–		1	–	4	–	1
Buffalo		–		1	–	5	–	0
CCNY		–		1	–	6	–	0
Duquesne		–		0	–	8	–	0

The 1922 Penn Quakers football team was an American football team that represented the University of Pennsylvania as an independent during the 1922 college football season. In their third and final season under head coach John Heisman, the Quakers compiled a 6–3 record and outscored all opponents by a total of 100 to 44. The team played its home games at Franklin Field in Philadelphia.

== Schedule ==
Date	Opponent	Site	Result	Attendance	Source
September 30	Franklin & Marshall	Franklin Field; Philadelphia, PA	W 14–0		
October 7	Sewanee	Franklin Field; Philadelphia, PA	W 27–0	20,000	
October 14	Maryland	Franklin Field; Philadelphia, PA	W 12–0		
October 21	Swarthmore	Franklin Field; Philadelphia, PA	W 14–6		
October 28	Navy	Franklin Field; Philadelphia, PA	W 13–7		
November 4	Alabama	Franklin Field; Philadelphia, PA	L 7–9	25,000	
November 11	Pittsburgh	Franklin Field; Philadelphia, PA	L 6–7	40,000	
November 18	Penn State	Franklin Field; Philadelphia, PA	W 7–6	50,000	
November 30	Cornell	Franklin Field; Philadelphia, PA (rivalry)	L 0–9		
