= 1922 Princeton Tigers football team =

American college football season

1922 Princeton Tigers football
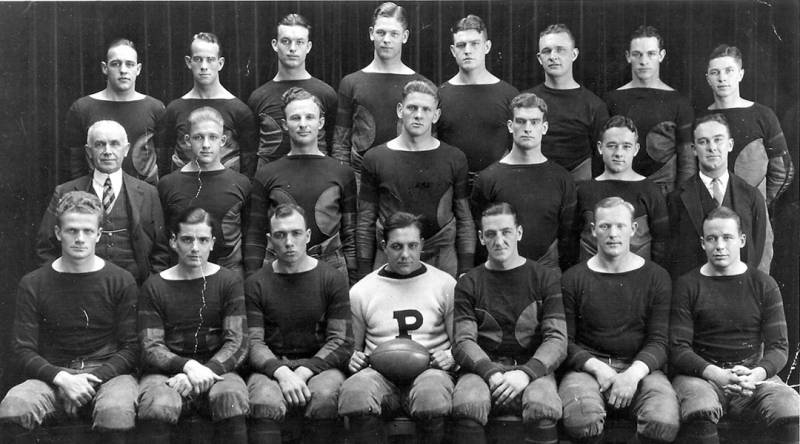

National champion (Boand, CFRA) Co-national champion (NCF, Davis, Sagarin-ELO)
- Conference: Independent
- Record: 8–0
- Head coach: Bill Roper (9th season)
- Offensive scheme: Short punt
- Captain: Mel Dickenson
- Home stadium: Palmer Stadium

Uniform
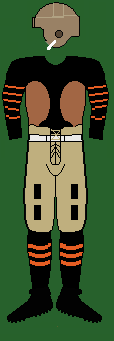

1922 Eastern college football independents records
	Conf.			Overall
Team	W	L	T	W		L		T
Cornell		–		8	–	0	–	0
Princeton		–		8	–	0	–	0
Army		–		8	–	0	–	2
Syracuse		–		6	–	1	–	2
Franklin & Marshall		–		8	–	2	–	0
Pittsburgh		–		8	–	2	–	0
Holy Cross		–		7	–	2	–	1
Harvard		–		7	–	2	–	0
Lafayette		–		7	–	2	–	0
Springfield		–		6	–	2	–	0
Boston College		–		6	–	2	–	1
Brown		–		6	–	2	–	1
Colgate		–		6	–	3	–	0
Dartmouth		–		6	–	3	–	0
Penn		–		6	–	3	–	0
Vermont		–		6	–	3	–	0
Washington & Jefferson		–		6	–	3	–	1
Yale		–		6	–	3	–	1
Bucknell		–		7	–	4	–	0
Penn State		–		6	–	4	–	1
Carnegie Tech		–		5	–	3	–	1
Villanova		–		5	–	3	–	1
Columbia		–		5	–	4	–	0
Rutgers		–		5	–	4	–	0
Tufts		–		5	–	4	–	0
Rhode Island State		–		4	–	4	–	0
NYU		–		4	–	5	–	0
Fordham		–		3	–	5	–	2
Geneva		–		4	–	6	–	0
Boston University		–		2	–	4	–	3
Lehigh		–		3	–	5	–	1
New Hampshire		–		3	–	5	–	1
Drexel		–		2	–	4	–	0
Temple		–		1	–	4	–	1
Buffalo		–		1	–	5	–	0
CCNY		–		1	–	6	–	0
Duquesne		–		0	–	8	–	0

The 1922 Princeton Tigers football team was an American football team that represented Princeton University as an independent during the 1922 college football season. In their ninth season under head coach Bill Roper, the Tigers compiled a perfect 8–0 record, shut out five of eight opponents, and outscored all opponents by a total of 127 to 34. Mel Dickenson was the team captain.

There was no contemporaneous system in 1922 for determining a national champion. However, Princeton was retroactively named as the national champion by the Boand System and College Football Researchers Association, and as a co-national champion by the National Championship Foundation, Parke H. Davis, and Jeff Sagarin (using the ELO-Chess methodology). California and Cornell were recognized by some selectors as the national champion or co-champion.

Princeton tackle Herb Treat was a consensus first-team player on the 1922 All-America team. Other notable players on the 1922 team included end Howdy Gray, halfback Jack Cleaves, tackle Harland "Pink" Baker, and guard Mel Dickinson. One player went to the NFL and used the name of Howdy Gray but possibly mispronounced it as Dolly Gray.

== Schedule ==
Date	Opponent	Site	Result	Attendance	Source
September 30	Johns Hopkins	Palmer Stadium; Princeton, NJ	W 30–0	7,400	
October 7	Virginia	Palmer Stadium; Princeton, NJ	W 5–0		
October 14	Colgate	Palmer Stadium; Princeton, NJ	W 10–0		
October 21	Maryland	Palmer Stadium; Princeton, NJ	W 26–0		
October 28	at Chicago	Stagg Field; Chicago, IL (first national radio broadcast)	W 21–18	31,000	
November 4	Swarthmore	Palmer Stadium; Princeton, NJ	W 22–13		
November 11	at Harvard	Harvard Stadium; Boston, MA (rivalry)	W 10–3	52,000	
November 18	Yale	Palmer Stadium; Princeton, NJ (rivalry)	W 3–0	56,000	

== Roster ==
- Oliver Alford, C
- Harland Baker, T
- Barry, FB
- Bob Beattie, FB
- Bergen, HB
- Buckner, G
- Charlie Caldwell, HB
- Jack Cleaves, FB
- Harry W. Crum, HB
- Mel Dickinson, G
- Brad Dinsmore, QB
- Ted Drews, E
- Harvey Emery, HB
- Paul Euwer, HB
- Gaines, E
- John P. Gorman, QB
- Howdy Gray, E
- Griffin, C
- Hills, T
- Howard, G
- J. J. Johnson, G
- Lawrence, E
- Ed McMillan, C
- Newby, HB
- Pagenkopf, QB
- Schenk, T
- Schneider, T
- Shackelford, FB
- Smith, E
- A. Barr Snively, E
- Snyder, T
- Stinson, HB
- Stout, E
- Tillson, E
- Thomson, C
- Herb Treat, T
- Tyson, E
- Howell Van Gerbig, T
- Wingate, QB
