= 1922 Dartmouth Indians football team =

American college football season

1922 Dartmouth Indians football
- Conference: Independent
- Record: 6–3
- Head coach: Jackson Cannell (2nd season)
- Captain: Charles Burke

1922 Eastern college football independents records
	Conf.			Overall
Team	W	L	T	W		L		T
Cornell		–		8	–	0	–	0
Princeton		–		8	–	0	–	0
Army		–		8	–	0	–	2
Syracuse		–		6	–	1	–	2
Franklin & Marshall		–		8	–	2	–	0
Pittsburgh		–		8	–	2	–	0
Holy Cross		–		7	–	2	–	1
Harvard		–		7	–	2	–	0
Lafayette		–		7	–	2	–	0
Springfield		–		6	–	2	–	0
Boston College		–		6	–	2	–	1
Brown		–		6	–	2	–	1
Colgate		–		6	–	3	–	0
Dartmouth		–		6	–	3	–	0
Penn		–		6	–	3	–	0
Vermont		–		6	–	3	–	0
Washington & Jefferson		–		6	–	3	–	1
Yale		–		6	–	3	–	1
Bucknell		–		7	–	4	–	0
Penn State		–		6	–	4	–	1
Carnegie Tech		–		5	–	3	–	1
Villanova		–		5	–	3	–	1
Columbia		–		5	–	4	–	0
Rutgers		–		5	–	4	–	0
Tufts		–		5	–	4	–	0
Rhode Island State		–		4	–	4	–	0
NYU		–		4	–	5	–	0
Fordham		–		3	–	5	–	2
Geneva		–		4	–	6	–	0
Boston University		–		2	–	4	–	3
Lehigh		–		3	–	5	–	1
New Hampshire		–		3	–	5	–	1
Drexel		–		2	–	4	–	0
Temple		–		1	–	4	–	1
Buffalo		–		1	–	5	–	0
CCNY		–		1	–	6	–	0
Duquesne		–		0	–	8	–	0

The 1922 Dartmouth Indians football team was an American football team that represented Dartmouth College as an independent during the 1922 college football season. In their second season under head coach Jackson Cannell, the Indians compiled a 6–3 record and outscored all opponents by a total of 111 to 55. Charles Burke was the team captain.

== Schedule ==
Date	Time	Opponent	Site	Result	Attendance	Source
September 30		Norwich	Hanover, NH	W 20–0		
October 7		Maine	Hanover, NH	W 19–0		
October 14		Middlebury	Hanover, NH	W 21–0		
October 21		at Vermont	Centennial Field; Burlington, VT	L 3–6	5,000	
October 28		at Harvard	Harvard Stadium; Boston, MA	L 3–12		
November 4		Boston University	Memorial Field; Hanover, NH	W 10–7		
November 11		vs. Cornell	Polo Grounds; New York, NY	L 0–23		
November 18		at Columbia	Polo Grounds; New York, NY	W 28–7	6,500	
November 25	2:00 p.m.	vs. Brown	Fenway Park; Boston, MA	W 7–0	22,000	
All times are in Eastern time
