= 1922 Syracuse Orangemen football team =

American college football season

1922 Syracuse Orangemen football
- Conference: Independent
- Record: 6–1–2
- Head coach: Chick Meehan (3rd season)
- Captain: Frank Culver
- Home stadium: Archbold Stadium

1922 Eastern college football independents records
	Conf.			Overall
Team	W	L	T	W		L		T
Cornell		–		8	–	0	–	0
Princeton		–		8	–	0	–	0
Army		–		8	–	0	–	2
Syracuse		–		6	–	1	–	2
Franklin & Marshall		–		8	–	2	–	0
Pittsburgh		–		8	–	2	–	0
Holy Cross		–		7	–	2	–	1
Harvard		–		7	–	2	–	0
Lafayette		–		7	–	2	–	0
Springfield		–		6	–	2	–	0
Boston College		–		6	–	2	–	1
Brown		–		6	–	2	–	1
Colgate		–		6	–	3	–	0
Dartmouth		–		6	–	3	–	0
Penn		–		6	–	3	–	0
Vermont		–		6	–	3	–	0
Washington & Jefferson		–		6	–	3	–	1
Yale		–		6	–	3	–	1
Bucknell		–		7	–	4	–	0
Penn State		–		6	–	4	–	1
Carnegie Tech		–		5	–	3	–	1
Villanova		–		5	–	3	–	1
Columbia		–		5	–	4	–	0
Rutgers		–		5	–	4	–	0
Tufts		–		5	–	4	–	0
Rhode Island State		–		4	–	4	–	0
NYU		–		4	–	5	–	0
Fordham		–		3	–	5	–	2
Geneva		–		4	–	6	–	0
Boston University		–		2	–	4	–	3
Lehigh		–		3	–	5	–	1
New Hampshire		–		3	–	5	–	1
Drexel		–		2	–	4	–	0
Temple		–		1	–	4	–	1
Buffalo		–		1	–	5	–	0
CCNY		–		1	–	6	–	0
Duquesne		–		0	–	8	–	0

The 1922 Syracuse Orangemen football team represented Syracuse University as an independent during the 1922 college football season.

== Schedule ==
Date	Opponent	Site	Result	Attendance	Source
September 23	Hobart	Archbold Stadium; Syracuse, NY	W 28–7	10,000	
September 30	Muhlenberg	Archbold Stadium; Syracuse, NY	W 47–0	12,000	
October 7	NYU	Archbold Stadium; Syracuse, NY	W 32–0	10,000	
October 14	at Brown	Andrews Field; Providence, RI	T 0–0		
October 21	Pittsburgh	Archbold Stadium; Syracuse, NY (rivalry)	L 14–21	20,000–25,000	
October 28	vs. Penn State	Polo Grounds; New York, NY (rivalry)	T 0–0	20,000–25,000	
November 4	Nebraska	Archbold Stadium; Syracuse, NY	W 9–6	14,000	
November 11	McGill	Archbold Stadium; Syracuse, NY	W 32–0	10,000	
November 18	Colgate	Archbold Stadium; Syracuse, NY (rivalry)	W 14–7	30,000	
