= 1922 Drexel Dragons football team =

College football team

1922 Drexel Dragons football
- Conference: Independent
- Record: 2–4
- Head coach: Harry J. O'Brien (1st season)
- Home stadium: Strawbridge & Clothier Field

1922 Eastern college football independents records
	Conf.			Overall
Team	W	L	T	W		L		T
Cornell		–		8	–	0	–	0
Princeton		–		8	–	0	–	0
Army		–		8	–	0	–	2
Syracuse		–		6	–	1	–	2
Franklin & Marshall		–		8	–	2	–	0
Pittsburgh		–		8	–	2	–	0
Holy Cross		–		7	–	2	–	1
Harvard		–		7	–	2	–	0
Lafayette		–		7	–	2	–	0
Springfield		–		6	–	2	–	0
Boston College		–		6	–	2	–	1
Brown		–		6	–	2	–	1
Colgate		–		6	–	3	–	0
Dartmouth		–		6	–	3	–	0
Penn		–		6	–	3	–	0
Vermont		–		6	–	3	–	0
Washington & Jefferson		–		6	–	3	–	1
Yale		–		6	–	3	–	1
Bucknell		–		7	–	4	–	0
Penn State		–		6	–	4	–	1
Carnegie Tech		–		5	–	3	–	1
Villanova		–		5	–	3	–	1
Columbia		–		5	–	4	–	0
Rutgers		–		5	–	4	–	0
Tufts		–		5	–	4	–	0
Rhode Island State		–		4	–	4	–	0
NYU		–		4	–	5	–	0
Fordham		–		3	–	5	–	2
Geneva		–		4	–	6	–	0
Boston University		–		2	–	4	–	3
Lehigh		–		3	–	5	–	1
New Hampshire		–		3	–	5	–	1
Drexel		–		2	–	4	–	0
Temple		–		1	–	4	–	1
Buffalo		–		1	–	5	–	0
CCNY		–		1	–	6	–	0
Duquesne		–		0	–	8	–	0

The 1922 Drexel Dragons football team represented Drexel Institute—now known as Drexel University—in the 1922 college football season. Led by Harry J. O'Brien in his first season as head coach, the team compiled a record of 2–4.

== Schedule ==
Date	Opponent	Site	Result	Source
October 14	New York Aggies	Philadelphia, PA	W 9–6	
October 21	at CCNY	Lewisohn Stadium; New York, NY	W 15–0	
October 28	at Juniata	Huntingdon, PA	L 6–46	
November 4	St. John's (MD)	Strawbridge and Clothier Field; Philadelphia, PA	L 0–52	
November 11	at Johns Hopkins	Homewood Field; Baltimore, MD	L 0–57	
November 25	Gallaudet	Strawbridge and Clothier Field; Philadelphia, PA	L 0–10	

== Roster ==
1922 Drexel Dragons football team roster
Players
Coaches
Offense

Pos.	#	Name	Class
TE		Jones
OT		Buckman
G		Mackin
C		MacQuarrie
G		Russell
OT		Repp
TE		Casner
HB		Shuman
HB		Heist
FB		Connell
QB		Weinberger

Defense

Pos.	#	Name	Class

Special teams

Pos.	#	Name	Class

Head coach

- Harry J. O'Brien (Swarthmore)

Coordinators/assistant coaches

Legend

- (C) Team captain
- (S) Suspended
- (I) Ineligible
- Injured
- Redshirt
