= 1922 Carnegie Tech Tartans football team =

American college football season

1922 Carnegie Tech Tartans football
- Conference: Independent
- Record: 5–3–1
- Head coach: Walter Steffen (8th season)
- Home stadium: Tech Field, Forbes Field

1922 Eastern college football independents records
| | Conf. | | | Overall |
| Team | W | L | T | W | | L | | T |
|---|---|---|---|---|---|---|---|---|
| Cornell | | – | | 8 | – | 0 | – | 0 |
| Princeton | | – | | 8 | – | 0 | – | 0 |
| Army | | – | | 8 | – | 0 | – | 2 |
| Syracuse | | – | | 6 | – | 1 | – | 2 |
| Franklin & Marshall | | – | | 8 | – | 2 | – | 0 |
| Pittsburgh | | – | | 8 | – | 2 | – | 0 |
| Holy Cross | | – | | 7 | – | 2 | – | 1 |
| Harvard | | – | | 7 | – | 2 | – | 0 |
| Lafayette | | – | | 7 | – | 2 | – | 0 |
| Springfield | | – | | 6 | – | 2 | – | 0 |
| Boston College | | – | | 6 | – | 2 | – | 1 |
| Brown | | – | | 6 | – | 2 | – | 1 |
| Colgate | | – | | 6 | – | 3 | – | 0 |
| Dartmouth | | – | | 6 | – | 3 | – | 0 |
| Penn | | – | | 6 | – | 3 | – | 0 |
| Vermont | | – | | 6 | – | 3 | – | 0 |
| Washington & Jefferson | | – | | 6 | – | 3 | – | 1 |
| Yale | | – | | 6 | – | 3 | – | 1 |
| Bucknell | | – | | 7 | – | 4 | – | 0 |
| Penn State | | – | | 6 | – | 4 | – | 1 |
| Carnegie Tech | | – | | 5 | – | 3 | – | 1 |
| Villanova | | – | | 5 | – | 3 | – | 1 |
| Columbia | | – | | 5 | – | 4 | – | 0 |
| Rutgers | | – | | 5 | – | 4 | – | 0 |
| Tufts | | – | | 5 | – | 4 | – | 0 |
| Rhode Island State | | – | | 4 | – | 4 | – | 0 |
| NYU | | – | | 4 | – | 5 | – | 0 |
| Fordham | | – | | 3 | – | 5 | – | 2 |
| Geneva | | – | | 4 | – | 6 | – | 0 |
| Boston University | | – | | 2 | – | 4 | – | 3 |
| Lehigh | | – | | 3 | – | 5 | – | 1 |
| New Hampshire | | – | | 3 | – | 5 | – | 1 |
| Drexel | | – | | 2 | – | 4 | – | 0 |
| Temple | | – | | 1 | – | 4 | – | 1 |
| Buffalo | | – | | 1 | – | 5 | – | 0 |
| CCNY | | – | | 1 | – | 6 | – | 0 |
| Duquesne | | – | | 0 | – | 8 | – | 0 |

The 1922 Carnegie Tech Tartans football team was an American football team that represented the Carnegie Institute of Technology (now known as Carnegie Mellon University) during the 1922 college football season. Led by eighth-year head coach Walter Steffen, Carnegie Tech compiled a record of 5–3–1.

== Schedule ==
| Date | Opponent | Site | Result | Attendance | Source |
|---|---|---|---|---|---|
| September 23 | Waynesburg | Tech Field; Pittsburgh, PA | W 54–0 | | |
| September 30 | at Yale | Yale Bowl; New Haven, CT | L 0–13 | | |
| October 7 | Geneva | Tech Field; Pittsburgh, PA | W 27–6 | | |
| October 14 | Washington & Jefferson | Pittsburgh, PA | T 7–7 | | |
| October 21 | at Thiel | Tech Field; Greenville, PA | W 59–0 | 8,000 | |
| October 28 | Grove City | Tech Field; Pittsburgh, PA | W 28–0 | | |
| November 4 | Allegheny | Tech Field; Pittsburgh, PA | W 7–0 | | |
| November 11 | at Penn State | New Beaver Field; State College, PA | L 0–10 | 17,000 | |
| November 25 | Notre Dame | Forbes Field; Pittsburgh, PA | L 0–19 | 30,000 | |
