= 1922 Brown Bears football team =

American college football season

1922 Brown Bears football
- Conference: Independent
- Record: 6–2–1
- Head coach: Edward N. Robinson (21st season)
- Captain: M. Gulian
- Home stadium: Andrews Field

1922 Eastern college football independents records
	Conf.			Overall
Team	W	L	T	W		L		T
Cornell		–		8	–	0	–	0
Princeton		–		8	–	0	–	0
Army		–		8	–	0	–	2
Syracuse		–		6	–	1	–	2
Franklin & Marshall		–		8	–	2	–	0
Pittsburgh		–		8	–	2	–	0
Holy Cross		–		7	–	2	–	1
Harvard		–		7	–	2	–	0
Lafayette		–		7	–	2	–	0
Springfield		–		6	–	2	–	0
Boston College		–		6	–	2	–	1
Brown		–		6	–	2	–	1
Colgate		–		6	–	3	–	0
Dartmouth		–		6	–	3	–	0
Penn		–		6	–	3	–	0
Vermont		–		6	–	3	–	0
Washington & Jefferson		–		6	–	3	–	1
Yale		–		6	–	3	–	1
Bucknell		–		7	–	4	–	0
Penn State		–		6	–	4	–	1
Carnegie Tech		–		5	–	3	–	1
Villanova		–		5	–	3	–	1
Columbia		–		5	–	4	–	0
Rutgers		–		5	–	4	–	0
Tufts		–		5	–	4	–	0
Rhode Island State		–		4	–	4	–	0
NYU		–		4	–	5	–	0
Fordham		–		3	–	5	–	2
Geneva		–		4	–	6	–	0
Boston University		–		2	–	4	–	3
Lehigh		–		3	–	5	–	1
New Hampshire		–		3	–	5	–	1
Drexel		–		2	–	4	–	0
Temple		–		1	–	4	–	1
Buffalo		–		1	–	5	–	0
CCNY		–		1	–	6	–	0
Duquesne		–		0	–	8	–	0

The 1922 Brown Bears football team represented Brown University as an independent during the 1922 college football season. Led by 21st-year head coach Edward N. Robinson, the Bears compiled a record of 6–2–1.

== Schedule ==
Date	Time	Opponent	Site	Result	Attendance	Source
September 30		Rhode Island State	Andrews Field; Providence, RI (rivalry)	W 27–0		
October 7		Colby	Andrews Field; Providence, RI	W 13–0		
October 14		Syracuse	Andrews Field; Providence, RI	T 0–0		
October 21	2:30 p.m.	at Lehigh	Taylor Stadium; Bethlehem, PA	W 6–2		
October 28		Boston University	Andrews Field; Providence, RI	W 16–6		
November 4		at Yale	Yale Bowl; New Haven, CT	L 0-20	30,000	
November 11		Bates	Andrews Field; Providence, RI	W 27–12		
November 18	2:00 p.m.	at Harvard	Harvard Stadium; Boston, MA	W 3–0	30,000	
November 25	2:00 p.m.	vs. Dartmouth	Fenway Park; Boston, MA	L 0–7	22,000	
All times are in Eastern time
