= 1922 CCNY Lavender football team =

American college football season

1922 CCNY Lavender football
- Conference: Independent
- Record: 1–6
- Home stadium: Lewisohn Stadium

1922 Eastern college football independents records
	Conf.			Overall
Team	W	L	T	W		L		T
Cornell		–		8	–	0	–	0
Princeton		–		8	–	0	–	0
Army		–		8	–	0	–	2
Syracuse		–		6	–	1	–	2
Franklin & Marshall		–		8	–	2	–	0
Pittsburgh		–		8	–	2	–	0
Holy Cross		–		7	–	2	–	1
Harvard		–		7	–	2	–	0
Lafayette		–		7	–	2	–	0
Springfield		–		6	–	2	–	0
Boston College		–		6	–	2	–	1
Brown		–		6	–	2	–	1
Colgate		–		6	–	3	–	0
Dartmouth		–		6	–	3	–	0
Penn		–		6	–	3	–	0
Vermont		–		6	–	3	–	0
Washington & Jefferson		–		6	–	3	–	1
Yale		–		6	–	3	–	1
Bucknell		–		7	–	4	–	0
Penn State		–		6	–	4	–	1
Carnegie Tech		–		5	–	3	–	1
Villanova		–		5	–	3	–	1
Columbia		–		5	–	4	–	0
Rutgers		–		5	–	4	–	0
Tufts		–		5	–	4	–	0
Rhode Island State		–		4	–	4	–	0
NYU		–		4	–	5	–	0
Fordham		–		3	–	5	–	2
Geneva		–		4	–	6	–	0
Boston University		–		2	–	4	–	3
Lehigh		–		3	–	5	–	1
New Hampshire		–		3	–	5	–	1
Drexel		–		2	–	4	–	0
Temple		–		1	–	4	–	1
Buffalo		–		1	–	5	–	0
CCNY		–		1	–	6	–	0
Duquesne		–		0	–	8	–	0

The 1922 CCNY Lavender football team was an American football team that represented the City College of New York (CCNY) as an independent during the 1922 college football season. In their first season since 1907, the team compiled a 1–6 record.

== Schedule ==
Date	Opponent	Site	Result	Source
October 7	St. Stephen's	Lewisohn Stadium; New York, NY	L 0–7	
October 14	Providence	Lewisohn Stadium; New York, NY	L 7–16	
October 21	Drexel	Lewisohn Stadium; New York, NY	L 0–15	
October 28	at Hobart	Geneva, NY	L 0–24	
November 4	New York Aggies	Lewisohn Stadium; New York, NY	W 14–7	
November 11	at NYU	Ohio Field; Bronx, NY	L 0–7	
November 18	Catholic University	Lewisohn Stadium; New York, NY	L 0–21	
