= 1922 Buffalo Bisons football team =

American college football season

1922 Buffalo Bisons football
- Conference: Independent
- Record: 1–5
- Head coach: Dim Batterson (1st season)
- Home stadium: Rotary Field

1922 Eastern college football independents records
	Conf.			Overall
Team	W	L	T	W		L		T
Cornell		–		8	–	0	–	0
Princeton		–		8	–	0	–	0
Army		–		8	–	0	–	2
Syracuse		–		6	–	1	–	2
Franklin & Marshall		–		8	–	2	–	0
Pittsburgh		–		8	–	2	–	0
Holy Cross		–		7	–	2	–	1
Harvard		–		7	–	2	–	0
Lafayette		–		7	–	2	–	0
Springfield		–		6	–	2	–	0
Boston College		–		6	–	2	–	1
Brown		–		6	–	2	–	1
Colgate		–		6	–	3	–	0
Dartmouth		–		6	–	3	–	0
Penn		–		6	–	3	–	0
Vermont		–		6	–	3	–	0
Washington & Jefferson		–		6	–	3	–	1
Yale		–		6	–	3	–	1
Bucknell		–		7	–	4	–	0
Penn State		–		6	–	4	–	1
Carnegie Tech		–		5	–	3	–	1
Villanova		–		5	–	3	–	1
Columbia		–		5	–	4	–	0
Rutgers		–		5	–	4	–	0
Tufts		–		5	–	4	–	0
Rhode Island State		–		4	–	4	–	0
NYU		–		4	–	5	–	0
Fordham		–		3	–	5	–	2
Geneva		–		4	–	6	–	0
Boston University		–		2	–	4	–	3
Lehigh		–		3	–	5	–	1
New Hampshire		–		3	–	5	–	1
Drexel		–		2	–	4	–	0
Temple		–		1	–	4	–	1
Buffalo		–		1	–	5	–	0
CCNY		–		1	–	6	–	0
Duquesne		–		0	–	8	–	0

The 1922 Buffalo Bisons football team represented the University of Buffalo as an independent during the 1922 college football season. Led by Dim Batterson in his first season as head coach, the team compiled a record of 1–5.

== Schedule ==
Date	Opponent	Site	Result
October 7	Mechanics Institute	Rotary Field; Buffalo, NY	W 12–0
October 14	Thiel	Rotary Field; Buffalo, NY	L 3–15
October 21	Alfred	Rotary Field; Buffalo, NY	L 0–6
October 28	Clarkson	Rotary Field; Buffalo, NY	L 0–18
November 4	at Rochester	Rochester, NY	L 0–19
November 11	Hobart	Rotary Field; Buffalo, NY	L 13–28
