= 1922 Lafayette football team =

American college football season

1922 Lafayette football
- Conference: Independent
- Record: 7–2
- Head coach: Jock Sutherland (4th season)
- Offensive scheme: Single-wing
- Captain: Frank Schwab
- Home stadium: March Field

1922 Eastern college football independents records
	Conf.			Overall
Team	W	L	T	W		L		T
Cornell		–		8	–	0	–	0
Princeton		–		8	–	0	–	0
Army		–		8	–	0	–	2
Syracuse		–		6	–	1	–	2
Franklin & Marshall		–		8	–	2	–	0
Pittsburgh		–		8	–	2	–	0
Holy Cross		–		7	–	2	–	1
Harvard		–		7	–	2	–	0
Lafayette		–		7	–	2	–	0
Springfield		–		6	–	2	–	0
Boston College		–		6	–	2	–	1
Brown		–		6	–	2	–	1
Colgate		–		6	–	3	–	0
Dartmouth		–		6	–	3	–	0
Penn		–		6	–	3	–	0
Vermont		–		6	–	3	–	0
Washington & Jefferson		–		6	–	3	–	1
Yale		–		6	–	3	–	1
Bucknell		–		7	–	4	–	0
Penn State		–		6	–	4	–	1
Carnegie Tech		–		5	–	3	–	1
Villanova		–		5	–	3	–	1
Columbia		–		5	–	4	–	0
Rutgers		–		5	–	4	–	0
Tufts		–		5	–	4	–	0
Rhode Island State		–		4	–	4	–	0
NYU		–		4	–	5	–	0
Fordham		–		3	–	5	–	2
Geneva		–		4	–	6	–	0
Boston University		–		2	–	4	–	3
Lehigh		–		3	–	5	–	1
New Hampshire		–		3	–	5	–	1
Drexel		–		2	–	4	–	0
Temple		–		1	–	4	–	1
Buffalo		–		1	–	5	–	0
CCNY		–		1	–	6	–	0
Duquesne		–		0	–	8	–	0

The 1922 Lafayette football team was an American football team that represented Lafayette College in the 1922 college football season. The team compiled a 7–2 and outscored opponents by a total of 206 to 40. Jock Sutherland was head coach, and the team's captain was Frank Schwab.

== Schedule ==
Date	Time	Opponent	Site	Result	Attendance	Source
September 30		Richmond	Easton, PA	W 34–0		
October 7		at Pittsburgh	Forbes Field; Pittsburgh, PA	W 7–0	15,000	
October 14		Muhlenberg	Easton, PA	W 62–0		
October 21		Bucknell	Easton, PA	W 28–7		
October 28	2:00 p.m.	at Boston College	Braves Field; Boston, MA	W 12–0		
November 4		vs. Washington & Jefferson	Polo Grounds; New York, NY	L 14–13	30,000	
November 11		at Rutgers	Neilson Field; New Brunswick, NJ	W 33–6		
November 25		Lehigh	Easton, PA	W 3–0		
December 2		at Georgetown	Griffith Stadium; Washington, DC	L 13–7		
All times are in Eastern time
