= 1922 Fordham Maroon football team =

American college football season

1922 Fordham Maroon football
- Conference: Independent
- Record: 3–5–2
- Head coach: Frank Gargan (3rd season)
- Captain: Sylvester Fitzpatrick
- Home stadium: Fordham Field

1922 Eastern college football independents records
	Conf.			Overall
Team	W	L	T	W		L		T
Cornell		–		8	–	0	–	0
Princeton		–		8	–	0	–	0
Army		–		8	–	0	–	2
Syracuse		–		6	–	1	–	2
Franklin & Marshall		–		8	–	2	–	0
Pittsburgh		–		8	–	2	–	0
Holy Cross		–		7	–	2	–	1
Harvard		–		7	–	2	–	0
Lafayette		–		7	–	2	–	0
Springfield		–		6	–	2	–	0
Boston College		–		6	–	2	–	1
Brown		–		6	–	2	–	1
Colgate		–		6	–	3	–	0
Dartmouth		–		6	–	3	–	0
Penn		–		6	–	3	–	0
Vermont		–		6	–	3	–	0
Washington & Jefferson		–		6	–	3	–	1
Yale		–		6	–	3	–	1
Bucknell		–		7	–	4	–	0
Penn State		–		6	–	4	–	1
Carnegie Tech		–		5	–	3	–	1
Villanova		–		5	–	3	–	1
Columbia		–		5	–	4	–	0
Rutgers		–		5	–	4	–	0
Tufts		–		5	–	4	–	0
Rhode Island State		–		4	–	4	–	0
NYU		–		4	–	5	–	0
Fordham		–		3	–	5	–	2
Geneva		–		4	–	6	–	0
Boston University		–		2	–	4	–	3
Lehigh		–		3	–	5	–	1
New Hampshire		–		3	–	5	–	1
Drexel		–		2	–	4	–	0
Temple		–		1	–	4	–	1
Buffalo		–		1	–	5	–	0
CCNY		–		1	–	6	–	0
Duquesne		–		0	–	8	–	0

The 1922 Fordham Maroon football team was an American football team that represented Fordham University as an independent during the 1922 college football season. In its third, non-consecutive season under coach Frank Gargan, Fordham compiled a 3–5–2 record and outscored opponents by a total of 152 to 93.

== Schedule ==
Date	Time	Opponent	Site	Result	Attendance	Source
September 30		Canisius	Fordham Field; Bronx, NY	W 13–0		
October 7		at Rutgers	Neilson Field; New Brunswick, NJ	L 15–20		
October 12	3:00 p.m.	at Boston College	Braves Field; Boston, MA	L 0–27	22,000	
October 21		Georgetown	Fordham Field; Bronx, NY	L 13–28	9,000	
October 28		Westminster (PA)	Fordham Field; Bronx, NY	W 12–0		
November 4		Springfield	Fordham Field; Bronx, NY	L 0–17		
November 7		at NYU	Ohio Field; Bronx, NY	W 14–6	6,000	
November 11		Colby	Fordham Field; Bronx, NY	T 6–6		
November 18		at Holy Cross	Fitton Field; Worcester, MA	L 0–28		
November 25		at Muhlenberg	Allentown, PA	T 20–20		
