= 1922 Washington & Jefferson Presidents football team =

American college football season

1922 Washington & Jefferson Presidents football
- Conference: Independent
- Record: 6–3–1
- Head coach: Greasy Neale (2nd season)

1922 Eastern college football independents records
	Conf.			Overall
Team	W	L	T	W		L		T
Cornell		–		8	–	0	–	0
Princeton		–		8	–	0	–	0
Army		–		8	–	0	–	2
Syracuse		–		6	–	1	–	2
Franklin & Marshall		–		8	–	2	–	0
Pittsburgh		–		8	–	2	–	0
Holy Cross		–		7	–	2	–	1
Harvard		–		7	–	2	–	0
Lafayette		–		7	–	2	–	0
Springfield		–		6	–	2	–	0
Boston College		–		6	–	2	–	1
Brown		–		6	–	2	–	1
Colgate		–		6	–	3	–	0
Dartmouth		–		6	–	3	–	0
Penn		–		6	–	3	–	0
Vermont		–		6	–	3	–	0
Washington & Jefferson		–		6	–	3	–	1
Yale		–		6	–	3	–	1
Bucknell		–		7	–	4	–	0
Penn State		–		6	–	4	–	1
Carnegie Tech		–		5	–	3	–	1
Villanova		–		5	–	3	–	1
Columbia		–		5	–	4	–	0
Rutgers		–		5	–	4	–	0
Tufts		–		5	–	4	–	0
Rhode Island State		–		4	–	4	–	0
NYU		–		4	–	5	–	0
Fordham		–		3	–	5	–	2
Geneva		–		4	–	6	–	0
Boston University		–		2	–	4	–	3
Lehigh		–		3	–	5	–	1
New Hampshire		–		3	–	5	–	1
Drexel		–		2	–	4	–	0
Temple		–		1	–	4	–	1
Buffalo		–		1	–	5	–	0
CCNY		–		1	–	6	–	0
Duquesne		–		0	–	8	–	0

The 1922 Washington & Jefferson Presidents football team was an American football team that represented Washington & Jefferson College as an independent during the 1922 college football season. The team compiled a 6–3–1 record. Greasy Neale was the head coach for the second year.

== Schedule ==
Date	Opponent	Site	Result	Attendance	Source
September 23	Geneva	Washington, PA	W 14–0		
September 30	Westminster (PA)	Washington, PA	W 34–0		
October 7	Bethany (WV)	Washington, PA	W 19–7		
October 14	at Carnegie Tech	Pittsburgh, PA	T 7–7		
October 21	West Virginia Wesleyan	Washington, PA	W 14–0		
November 4	vs. Lafayette	Polo Grounds; New York, NY	W 14–13	30,000	
November 11	Wabash	Washington, PA	W 32–6		
November 18	at Pittsburgh	Forbes Field; Pittsburgh, PA	L 0–19	35,000	
November 25	at Detroit	University of Detroit Stadium; Detroit, MI	L 9–20		
November 30	at West Virginia	WVU Athletic Field; Morgantown, WV	L 0–14	13,000	
