= 1922 Penn State Nittany Lions football team =

American college football season

1922 Penn State Nittany Lions football

Rose Bowl, L 3–14 vs. USC
- Conference: Independent
- Record: 6–4–1
- Head coach: Hugo Bezdek (5th season)
- Captain: Newsh Bentz
- Home stadium: New Beaver Field

Uniform
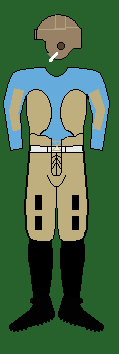

1922 Eastern college football independents records
	Conf.			Overall
Team	W	L	T	W		L		T
Cornell		–		8	–	0	–	0
Princeton		–		8	–	0	–	0
Army		–		8	–	0	–	2
Syracuse		–		6	–	1	–	2
Franklin & Marshall		–		8	–	2	–	0
Pittsburgh		–		8	–	2	–	0
Holy Cross		–		7	–	2	–	1
Harvard		–		7	–	2	–	0
Lafayette		–		7	–	2	–	0
Springfield		–		6	–	2	–	0
Boston College		–		6	–	2	–	1
Brown		–		6	–	2	–	1
Colgate		–		6	–	3	–	0
Dartmouth		–		6	–	3	–	0
Penn		–		6	–	3	–	0
Vermont		–		6	–	3	–	0
Washington & Jefferson		–		6	–	3	–	1
Yale		–		6	–	3	–	1
Bucknell		–		7	–	4	–	0
Penn State		–		6	–	4	–	1
Carnegie Tech		–		5	–	3	–	1
Villanova		–		5	–	3	–	1
Columbia		–		5	–	4	–	0
Rutgers		–		5	–	4	–	0
Tufts		–		5	–	4	–	0
Rhode Island State		–		4	–	4	–	0
NYU		–		4	–	5	–	0
Fordham		–		3	–	5	–	2
Geneva		–		4	–	6	–	0
Boston University		–		2	–	4	–	3
Lehigh		–		3	–	5	–	1
New Hampshire		–		3	–	5	–	1
Drexel		–		2	–	4	–	0
Temple		–		1	–	4	–	1
Buffalo		–		1	–	5	–	0
CCNY		–		1	–	6	–	0
Duquesne		–		0	–	8	–	0

The 1922 Penn State Nittany Lions football team represented the Pennsylvania State University as an independent during the 1922 college football season. The team was coached by Hugo Bezdek and played its home games in New Beaver Field in State College, Pennsylvania.

The Lions were invited to the Rose Bowl on New Year's Day, the first edition of the bowl game played in the current stadium.

== Schedule ==
Date	Opponent	Site	Result	Attendance	Source
September 23	St. Bonaventure	New Beaver Field; State College, PA	W 54–0	3,000	
September 30	William & Mary	New Beaver Field; State College, PA	W 27–7	3,000	
October 7	Gettysburg	New Beaver Field; State College, PA	W 20–0	3,000	
October 14	Lebanon Valley	New Beaver Field; State College, PA	W 32–6	3,000	
October 21	Middlebury^{†}	New Beaver Field; State College, PA	W 33–0	4,000	
October 28	vs. Syracuse	Polo Grounds; New York, NY (rivalry)	T 0–0	25,000	
November 3	vs. Navy	American League Park; Washington, DC	L 0–14	30,000	
November 11	Carnegie Tech	New Beaver Field; State College, PA	W 10–0	17,000	
November 18	at Penn	Franklin Field; Philadelphia, PA	L 6–7	50,000	
November 30	at Pittsburgh	Forbes Field; Pittsburgh, PA (rivalry)	L 0–14	33,000	
January 1, 1923	vs. USC	Rose Bowl; Pasadena, CA (Rose Bowl)	L 3–14	43,000	
^{†}Homecoming
