= 1922 Yale Bulldogs football team =

American college football season

1922 Yale Bulldogs football
- Conference: Independent
- Record: 6–3–1
- Head coach: Tad Jones (5th season)
- Offensive scheme: Single-wing
- Captain: Ralph E. Jordan
- Home stadium: Yale Bowl

1922 Eastern college football independents records
	Conf.			Overall
Team	W	L	T	W		L		T
Cornell		–		8	–	0	–	0
Princeton		–		8	–	0	–	0
Army		–		8	–	0	–	2
Syracuse		–		6	–	1	–	2
Franklin & Marshall		–		8	–	2	–	0
Pittsburgh		–		8	–	2	–	0
Holy Cross		–		7	–	2	–	1
Harvard		–		7	–	2	–	0
Lafayette		–		7	–	2	–	0
Springfield		–		6	–	2	–	0
Boston College		–		6	–	2	–	1
Brown		–		6	–	2	–	1
Colgate		–		6	–	3	–	0
Dartmouth		–		6	–	3	–	0
Penn		–		6	–	3	–	0
Vermont		–		6	–	3	–	0
Washington & Jefferson		–		6	–	3	–	1
Yale		–		6	–	3	–	1
Bucknell		–		7	–	4	–	0
Penn State		–		6	–	4	–	1
Carnegie Tech		–		5	–	3	–	1
Villanova		–		5	–	3	–	1
Columbia		–		5	–	4	–	0
Rutgers		–		5	–	4	–	0
Tufts		–		5	–	4	–	0
Rhode Island State		–		4	–	4	–	0
NYU		–		4	–	5	–	0
Fordham		–		3	–	5	–	2
Geneva		–		4	–	6	–	0
Boston University		–		2	–	4	–	3
Lehigh		–		3	–	5	–	1
New Hampshire		–		3	–	5	–	1
Drexel		–		2	–	4	–	0
Temple		–		1	–	4	–	1
Buffalo		–		1	–	5	–	0
CCNY		–		1	–	6	–	0
Duquesne		–		0	–	8	–	0

The 1922 Yale Bulldogs football team was an American football team that represented Yale University as an independent during the 1922 college football season. The Bulldogs finished with a 6–3–1 record under fifth-year head coach Tad Jones.

== Schedule ==
Date	Opponent	Site	Result	Attendance	Source
September 23	Bates	Yale Bowl; New Haven, CT	W 48–0	20,000	
September 30	Carnegie Tech	Yale Bowl; New Haven, CT	W 13–0		
October 7	North Carolina	Yale Bowl; New Haven, CT	W 18–0		
October 14	Iowa	Yale Bowl; New Haven, CT	L 0–6		
October 21	Williams	Yale Bowl; New Haven, CT	W 38–0		
October 28	Army	Yale Bowl; New Haven, CT	T 7–7	77,000	
November 4	Brown	Yale Bowl; New Haven, CT	W 20–0	30,000	
November 11	Maryland	Yale Bowl; New Haven, CT	W 45–3	10,000	
November 18	at Princeton	Palmer Stadium; Princeton, NJ (rivalry)	L 0–3	56,000	
November 25	Harvard	Yale Bowl; New Haven, CT (rivalry)	L 3–10	78,000	
