= 1922 Vermont Green and Gold football team =

American college football season

1922 Vermont Green and Gold football
- Conference: Independent
- Record: 6–3
- Head coach: Tom Keady (2nd season)
- Home stadium: Centennial Field

1922 Eastern college football independents records
	Conf.			Overall
Team	W	L	T	W		L		T
Cornell		–		8	–	0	–	0
Princeton		–		8	–	0	–	0
Army		–		8	–	0	–	2
Syracuse		–		6	–	1	–	2
Franklin & Marshall		–		8	–	2	–	0
Pittsburgh		–		8	–	2	–	0
Holy Cross		–		7	–	2	–	1
Harvard		–		7	–	2	–	0
Lafayette		–		7	–	2	–	0
Springfield		–		6	–	2	–	0
Boston College		–		6	–	2	–	1
Brown		–		6	–	2	–	1
Colgate		–		6	–	3	–	0
Dartmouth		–		6	–	3	–	0
Penn		–		6	–	3	–	0
Vermont		–		6	–	3	–	0
Washington & Jefferson		–		6	–	3	–	1
Yale		–		6	–	3	–	1
Bucknell		–		7	–	4	–	0
Penn State		–		6	–	4	–	1
Carnegie Tech		–		5	–	3	–	1
Villanova		–		5	–	3	–	1
Columbia		–		5	–	4	–	0
Rutgers		–		5	–	4	–	0
Tufts		–		5	–	4	–	0
Rhode Island State		–		4	–	4	–	0
NYU		–		4	–	5	–	0
Fordham		–		3	–	5	–	2
Geneva		–		4	–	6	–	0
Boston University		–		2	–	4	–	3
Lehigh		–		3	–	5	–	1
New Hampshire		–		3	–	5	–	1
Drexel		–		2	–	4	–	0
Temple		–		1	–	4	–	1
Buffalo		–		1	–	5	–	0
CCNY		–		1	–	6	–	0
Duquesne		–		0	–	8	–	0

The 1922 Vermont Green and Gold football team was an American football team that represented the University of Vermont as an independent during the 1922 college football season. In their third year under head coach Tom Keady, the team compiled a 6–3 record.

== Schedule ==
Date	Opponent	Site	Result	Attendance	Source
September 30	at Maine	Alumni Field; Orono, ME	W 7–0		
October 7	Springfield	Centennial Field; Burlington, VT	L 0–7	2,500	
October 14	Boston University	Centennial Field; Burlington, VT	W 7–0		
October 21	at Dartmouth	Hanover, NH	W 6–3	5,000	
October 28	at Holy Cross	Fitton Field; Worcester, MA	L 0–6		
November 4	at New Hampshire	Memorial Field; Durham, NH	W 33–0	5,000	
November 11	Norwich	Centennial Field; Burlington, VT	W 61–0		
November 18	at Middlebury	Porter Field; Middlebury, VT	W 32–0	4,000	
November 30	at Detroit	University of Detroit Stadium; Detroit, MI	L 10–14		
