= 1922 Lehigh Brown and White football team =

American college football season

1922 Lehigh Brown and White football
- Conference: Independent
- Record: 3–5–1
- Head coach: James A. Baldwin (1st season)
- Home stadium: Taylor Stadium

1922 Eastern college football independents records
	Conf.			Overall
Team	W	L	T	W		L		T
Cornell		–		8	–	0	–	0
Princeton		–		8	–	0	–	0
Army		–		8	–	0	–	2
Syracuse		–		6	–	1	–	2
Franklin & Marshall		–		8	–	2	–	0
Pittsburgh		–		8	–	2	–	0
Holy Cross		–		7	–	2	–	1
Harvard		–		7	–	2	–	0
Lafayette		–		7	–	2	–	0
Springfield		–		6	–	2	–	0
Boston College		–		6	–	2	–	1
Brown		–		6	–	2	–	1
Colgate		–		6	–	3	–	0
Dartmouth		–		6	–	3	–	0
Penn		–		6	–	3	–	0
Vermont		–		6	–	3	–	0
Washington & Jefferson		–		6	–	3	–	1
Yale		–		6	–	3	–	1
Bucknell		–		7	–	4	–	0
Penn State		–		6	–	4	–	1
Carnegie Tech		–		5	–	3	–	1
Villanova		–		5	–	3	–	1
Columbia		–		5	–	4	–	0
Rutgers		–		5	–	4	–	0
Tufts		–		5	–	4	–	0
Rhode Island State		–		4	–	4	–	0
NYU		–		4	–	5	–	0
Fordham		–		3	–	5	–	2
Geneva		–		4	–	6	–	0
Boston University		–		2	–	4	–	3
Lehigh		–		3	–	5	–	1
New Hampshire		–		3	–	5	–	1
Drexel		–		2	–	4	–	0
Temple		–		1	–	4	–	1
Buffalo		–		1	–	5	–	0
CCNY		–		1	–	6	–	0
Duquesne		–		0	–	8	–	0

The 1922 Lehigh Brown and White football team was an American football team that represented Lehigh University as an independent during the 1922 college football season. In its first season under head coach James A. Baldwin, the team compiled a 3–5–1 record and outscored opponents by a total of 84 to 80. Lehigh played home games at Taylor Stadium in Bethlehem, Pennsylvania.

== Schedule ==
Date	Time	Opponent	Site	Result	Source
September 30		at Gettysburg	Gettysburg, PA	T 0–0	
October 7		Saint Francis (PA)	Taylor Stadium; Bethlehem, PA	W 37–0	
October 14		Rutgers	Taylor Stadium; Bethlehem, PA	L 7–13	
October 21	2:30 p.m.	Brown	Taylor Stadium; Bethlehem, PA	L 2–6	
October 28		Muhlenberg	Taylor Stadium; Bethlehem, PA	W 26–7	
November 4		vs. Colgate	Binghamton, NY	L 6–35	
November 11		Bucknell	Taylor Stadium; Bethlehem, PA	L 0–14	
November 18		Lebanon Valley	Taylor Stadium; Bethlehem, PA	W 6–2	
November 25		at Lafayette	March Field; Easton, PA (rivalry)	L 0–3	
All times are in Eastern time
