= Patrick W. Timberlake =

United States Army general (1901–1983)

Patrick Weston Timberlake
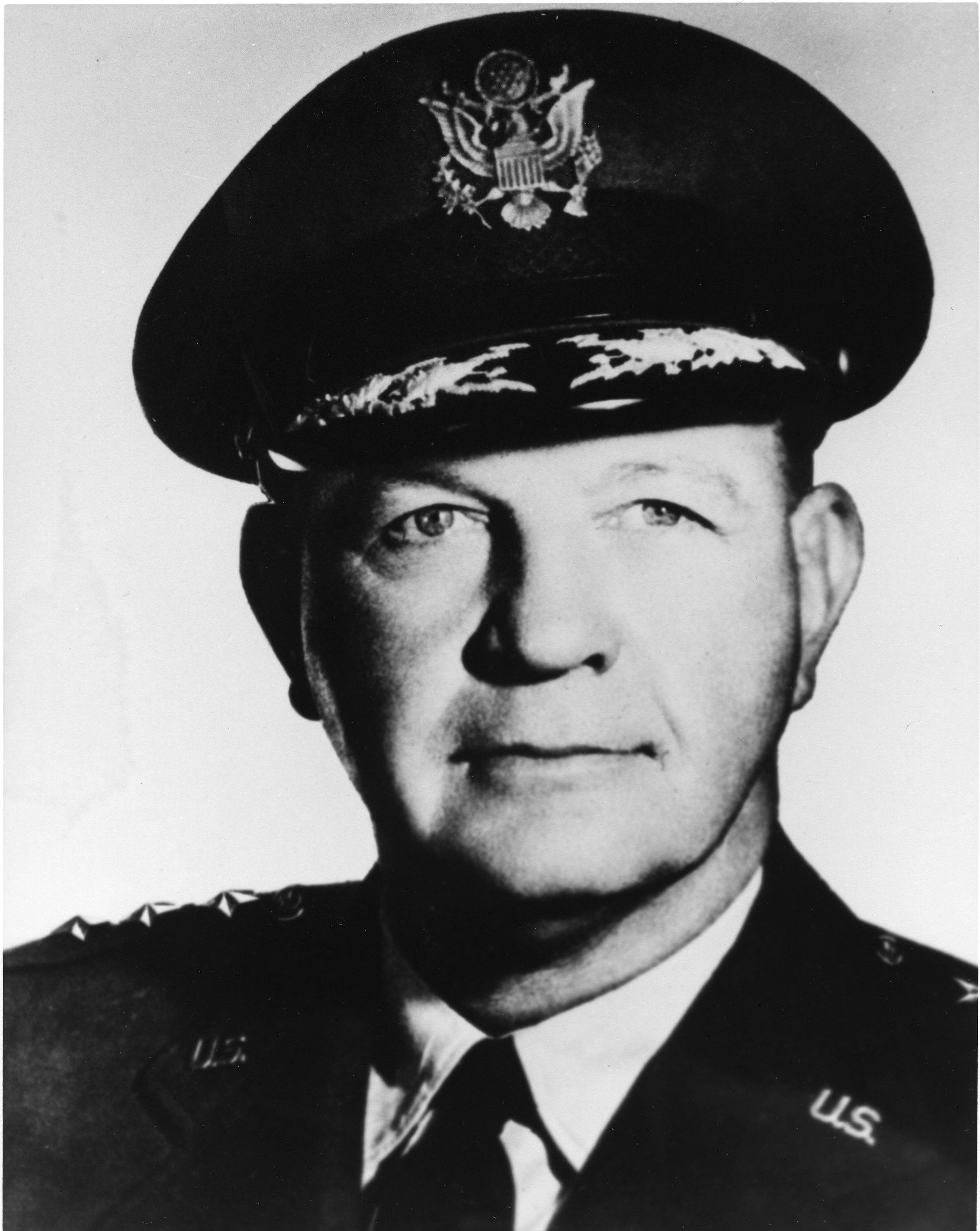
- Born: December 25, 1901; Fort Greble, Dutch Island, Newport County, Rhode Island, U.S.
- Died: October 18, 1983 (aged 81); San Antonio, Texas, U.S.
- Burial place: Sunset Memorial Park, San Antonio
- Spouse: Emily Bynum (m. 1927)
- Relatives: Lieutenant General Edward J. Timberlake Jr. (brother); Brigadier General Edward W. Timberlake (brother); Colonel Edward J. Timberlake Sr. (father)
- Military career
- Allegiance: United States
- Branch: United States Army; United States Air Force
- Service years: 1923–1957
- Rank: Lieutenant General
- Commands: 78th Pursuit Squadron; 9th Bomber Command; Eighth Air Force; Air Proving Ground Command; 1st Air Division; Allied Air Forces in Southern Europe
- Conflicts: World War II: Western Desert Campaign; Pantelleria Campaign; Sicily Campaign; Allied invasion of Italy; Ploiesti Raid; Pacific Theater of Operations
- Awards: Distinguished Service Medal (2); Legion of Merit (2); Bronze Star

Patrick Weston Timberlake (December 25, 1901 – October 18, 1983) was a lieutenant general in the United States Air Force. During World War II, he served as member of the Army Air Forces in both the Mediterranean and Pacific theaters of operation.

Timberlake attended the U.S. Military Academy, having a successful role on the football team there. Upon his graduation in 1923, he was commissioned in the U.S. Army as a second lieutenant of Artillery. He later moved to the Army Air Corps and became a certified command pilot, combat observer, and aircraft observer. He commanded units in Panama, North Africa, Okinawa and Naples before retiring from the U.S. Air Force in 1957.

== Early life ==
Timberlake was born in Fort Greble, Dutch Island, Newport County, Rhode Island on Christmas Day, 1901. His family had a strong military tradition, with several West Point graduates. His father, Colonel Edward J. Timberlake Sr., U.S. Army, USMA Class of 1893, played for West Point in the first Army-Navy football game in 1890. Col. Timberlake had four sons, who all graduated from West Point. The second youngest, J. Coleman Timberlake, died in 1938 at age 32, but Patrick and his three brothers carried on the family's military tradition. His youngest brother, Edward J. Timberlake Jr., was also a decorated Air Force lieutenant general who served in World War II; the oldest son, Edward W. Timberlake, was an Army brigadier general.

== Military career ==
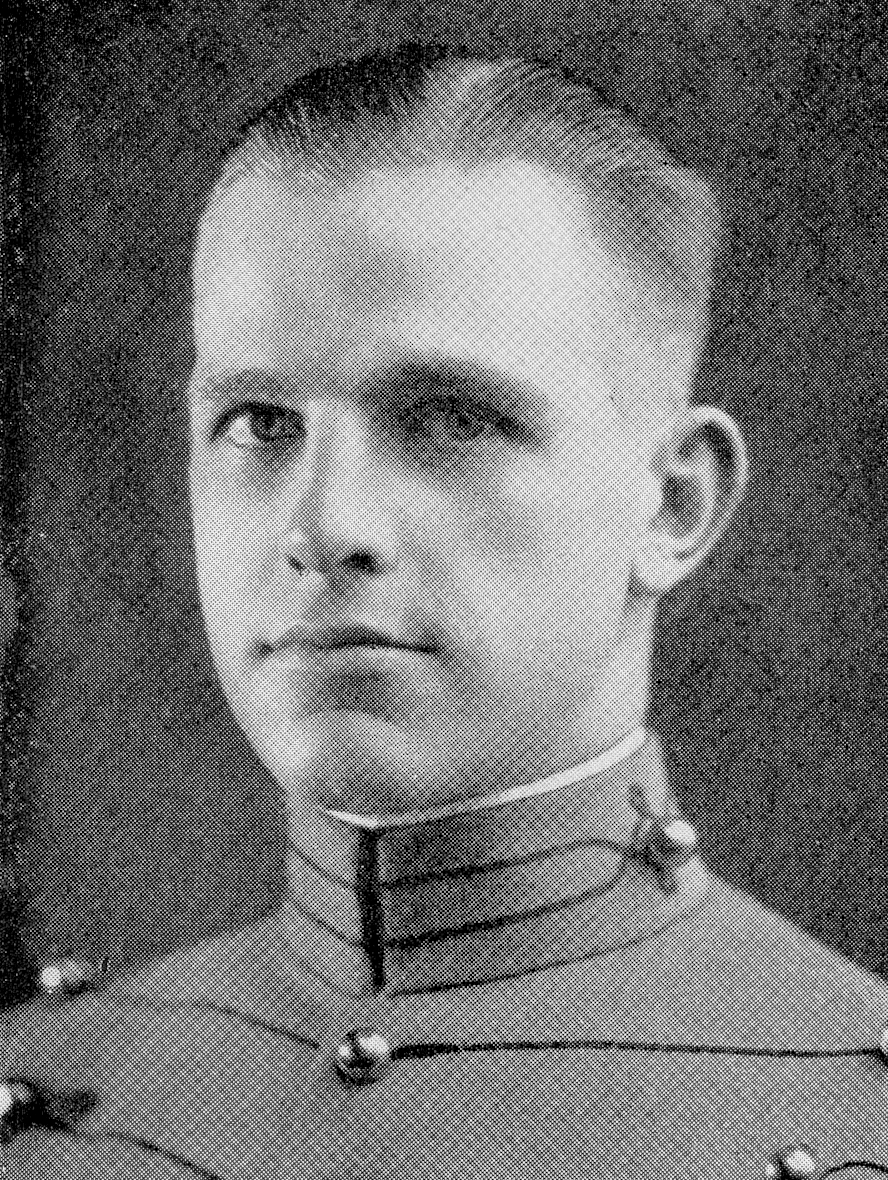
At West Point in 1923

Timberlake enrolled in the U.S. Military Academy at West Point where he played football as a tight end. He had a critical role in the Army–Navy Game in 1922. He caught the go-ahead touchdown in the 4th Quarter to beat the Midshipmen, by 17–14.

After graduating in 1923, he went into artillery with the Sixth Field Artillery at Fort Holye, Maryland. In 1925 he transferred to the 17th Field Artillery at Fort Bragg, North Carolina. In September 1925 he entered Primary Flying School at Brooks Field, Texas, which completely changed the course of his career. He was assigned to bombers in the Second Bomber Group shortly before the formation of the U.S. Army Air Corps. After a spell as a flight instructor he was transferred to the Panama Canal Zone with the 24th Pursuit Squadron in 1929. In 1931 he was appointed to a command with the 78th Pursuit Squadron. He enrolled in the Air Corps Engineering School in 1933. He was then assigned to the Aircraft Branch of the Air Corps Materiel Division, and in October 1935 was appointed chief of the Attack and Observation Engineering Unit there. In the following years he attended the Air Corps Tactical School (1937–1938) and the Command and General Staff School (1938–1939).

He married Emily Bynum on April 5, 1927.

=== World War II ===
Timberlake entered combat operations in World War II as a colonel in North Africa in charge of IX Bomber Command. He was appointed director of operations and plans for British Air Chief Marshal Tedder in 1943, and took over as his chief of staff after the formation of the Mediterranean Air Command. During this time he helped in the planning and execution of the campaigns in North Africa, Pantelleria, Sicily and mainland Italy. Returning to Washington D.C. in 1944, he was reassigned to 8th Air Force in Okinawa under Jimmy Doolittle in July 1945.

=== Post-world war ===
Timberlake assumed command of the 8th Air Force in 1946 before moving to various high-level roles in the Army-Navy Munitions Board from late 1946 to 1950. In 1952, he assumed command of the U.S. Air Forces's Air Proving Ground Command at Eglin Air Force Base until 1955. He was then transferred to Supreme Headquarters, Allied Powers in Europe where he assumed the command of Allied Air Forces in Southern Europe based in Naples. He retired as a lieutenant general in 1957 and received a second award of the Distinguished Service Medal.

== Later years and death ==
In his post-military career he worked with the Northrop Corporation. He died in San Antonio, Texas in 1983, aged 81, and was buried at Sunset Memorial Park.
