= 1922 Cornell Big Red football team =

American college football season

1922 Cornell Big Red football

National champion (Helms) Co-national champion (Davis)
- Conference: Independent
- Record: 8–0
- Head coach: Gil Dobie (3rd season)
- Offensive scheme: Single-wing
- Base defense: 6–3–2
- Captain: Eddie Kaw
- Home stadium: Schoellkopf Field

Uniform
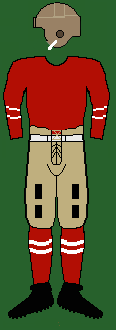

1922 Eastern college football independents records
	Conf.			Overall
Team	W	L	T	W		L		T
Cornell		–		8	–	0	–	0
Princeton		–		8	–	0	–	0
Army		–		8	–	0	–	2
Syracuse		–		6	–	1	–	2
Franklin & Marshall		–		8	–	2	–	0
Pittsburgh		–		8	–	2	–	0
Holy Cross		–		7	–	2	–	1
Harvard		–		7	–	2	–	0
Lafayette		–		7	–	2	–	0
Springfield		–		6	–	2	–	0
Boston College		–		6	–	2	–	1
Brown		–		6	–	2	–	1
Colgate		–		6	–	3	–	0
Dartmouth		–		6	–	3	–	0
Penn		–		6	–	3	–	0
Vermont		–		6	–	3	–	0
Washington & Jefferson		–		6	–	3	–	1
Yale		–		6	–	3	–	1
Bucknell		–		7	–	4	–	0
Penn State		–		6	–	4	–	1
Carnegie Tech		–		5	–	3	–	1
Villanova		–		5	–	3	–	1
Columbia		–		5	–	4	–	0
Rutgers		–		5	–	4	–	0
Tufts		–		5	–	4	–	0
Rhode Island State		–		4	–	4	–	0
NYU		–		4	–	5	–	0
Fordham		–		3	–	5	–	2
Geneva		–		4	–	6	–	0
Boston University		–		2	–	4	–	3
Lehigh		–		3	–	5	–	1
New Hampshire		–		3	–	5	–	1
Drexel		–		2	–	4	–	0
Temple		–		1	–	4	–	1
Buffalo		–		1	–	5	–	0
CCNY		–		1	–	6	–	0
Duquesne		–		0	–	8	–	0

The 1922 Cornell Big Red football team was an American football team that represented Cornell University as an independent during the 1922 college football season. In its third season under head coach Gil Dobie, Cornell compiled an 8–0 record, shut out five of nine opponents, and outscored all opponents by a total of 339 to 27. The 1922 season was part of 26-game winning streak that began in October 1921 and ended in October 1924 and included national championship claims for 1921, 1922, and 1923.

There was no contemporaneous system in 1922 for determining a national champion. However, Cornell was retroactively named as the national champion by the Helms Athletic Foundation and as a co-national champion (with Princeton) by Parke H. Davis. Other selectors chose Princeton and/or California as the 1922 national champion.

Cornell halfback Eddie Kaw was the team captain. He was chosen as a first-team All-American by nine of the ten selectors, and he also had more votes (122) than any other player in the All-America survey conducted by the Romelke Press Clipping Bureau, based on votes of "nearly every important pressman who has picked an All-American team." In addition to Kaw, several Cornell players were also included on All-Eastern teams, including quarterback George Pfann, halfback Floyd Ramsey, end Buckley, guard Furlong Flynn, center Richards, and tackles Leonard C. Hanson and Frank Sundstrom.

== Schedule ==
Date	Opponent	Site	Result	Attendance	Source
September 30	St. Bonaventure	Schoellkopf Field; Ithaca, NY	W 55–6		
October 7	Niagara	Schoellkopf Field; Ithaca, NY	W 66–0		
October 14	New Hampshire	Schoellkopf Field; Ithaca, NY	W 68–7		
October 21	Colgate	Schoellkopf Field; Ithaca, NY (rivalry)	W 14–0		
November 4	Columbia	Schoellkopf Field; Ithaca, NY (rivalry)	W 56–0		
November 11	vs. Dartmouth	Polo Grounds; New York, NY (rivalry)	W 23–0	35,000–40,000	
November 18	Albright	Schoellkopf Field; Ithaca, NY	W 48–14		
November 30	at Penn	Franklin Field; Philadelphia, PA (rivalry)	W 9–0	> 56,000	

== Roster ==
- John H. Berean, G
- Bosworth, QB
- Brannon, G
- Elias F. Buckley, E
- Charles E. Cassidy, E
- Covert, HB
- Dallas, C
- Dexter, E
- Furlong Flynn, G
- Hal Ebersole, G
- Edward V. Gouinlock, E
- Leonard C. Hanson, T
- Hart, FB
- Frank L. Henderson, E
- Eddie Kaw, HB
- Harold F. Kneen, E
- Mott-Smith, C
- Parker, T
- Robert F. Patterson, FB
- George Pfann, QB
- Post, HB
- Floyd Ramsey, HB
- Bartlett Richards, C
- Walter R. Rollo, G
- Rooney, QB
- Bernard A. Savage, T
- B. Smith, G
- Sullivan, T
- Frank Sundstrom, T
- Henry S. Wade, HB
- Walter Whetstone, FB
- Zacher, T
