= 1922 Temple Owls football team =

American college football season

1922 Temple Owls football
- Conference: Independent
- Record: 1–4–1
- Head coach: M. Francois D'Eliscu (1st season)
- Captain: George Thompson

1922 Eastern college football independents records
	Conf.			Overall
Team	W	L	T	W		L		T
Cornell		–		8	–	0	–	0
Princeton		–		8	–	0	–	0
Army		–		8	–	0	–	2
Syracuse		–		6	–	1	–	2
Franklin & Marshall		–		8	–	2	–	0
Pittsburgh		–		8	–	2	–	0
Holy Cross		–		7	–	2	–	1
Harvard		–		7	–	2	–	0
Lafayette		–		7	–	2	–	0
Springfield		–		6	–	2	–	0
Boston College		–		6	–	2	–	1
Brown		–		6	–	2	–	1
Colgate		–		6	–	3	–	0
Dartmouth		–		6	–	3	–	0
Penn		–		6	–	3	–	0
Vermont		–		6	–	3	–	0
Washington & Jefferson		–		6	–	3	–	1
Yale		–		6	–	3	–	1
Bucknell		–		7	–	4	–	0
Penn State		–		6	–	4	–	1
Carnegie Tech		–		5	–	3	–	1
Villanova		–		5	–	3	–	1
Columbia		–		5	–	4	–	0
Rutgers		–		5	–	4	–	0
Tufts		–		5	–	4	–	0
Rhode Island State		–		4	–	4	–	0
NYU		–		4	–	5	–	0
Fordham		–		3	–	5	–	2
Geneva		–		4	–	6	–	0
Boston University		–		2	–	4	–	3
Lehigh		–		3	–	5	–	1
New Hampshire		–		3	–	5	–	1
Drexel		–		2	–	4	–	0
Temple		–		1	–	4	–	1
Buffalo		–		1	–	5	–	0
CCNY		–		1	–	6	–	0
Duquesne		–		0	–	8	–	0

The 1922 Temple Owls football team was an American football team that represented Temple University as an independent during the 1922 college football season. In its first season under head coach M. Francois D'Eliscu, the team compiled a 1–4–1 record.

== Schedule ==
Date	Opponent	Site	Result	Attendance	Source
	East Stroudsburg		W 14–0		
	Trenton		T 0–0		
	New York Aggies		T 0–40		
	Millersville		L 0–31		
October 28	at Gallaudet	Kendall Green; Washington, DC	L 6–31		
November 4	Saint Joseph's	Tabor Field	L 6–20		
