= 1922 Colgate football team =

American college football season

1922 Colgate football
- Conference: Independent
- Record: 6–3
- Head coach: Dick Harlow (1st season)
- Captain: Bernard Traynor
- Home stadium: Whitnall Field

1922 Eastern college football independents records
	Conf.			Overall
Team	W	L	T	W		L		T
Cornell		–		8	–	0	–	0
Princeton		–		8	–	0	–	0
Army		–		8	–	0	–	2
Syracuse		–		6	–	1	–	2
Franklin & Marshall		–		8	–	2	–	0
Pittsburgh		–		8	–	2	–	0
Holy Cross		–		7	–	2	–	1
Harvard		–		7	–	2	–	0
Lafayette		–		7	–	2	–	0
Springfield		–		6	–	2	–	0
Boston College		–		6	–	2	–	1
Brown		–		6	–	2	–	1
Colgate		–		6	–	3	–	0
Dartmouth		–		6	–	3	–	0
Penn		–		6	–	3	–	0
Vermont		–		6	–	3	–	0
Washington & Jefferson		–		6	–	3	–	1
Yale		–		6	–	3	–	1
Bucknell		–		7	–	4	–	0
Penn State		–		6	–	4	–	1
Carnegie Tech		–		5	–	3	–	1
Villanova		–		5	–	3	–	1
Columbia		–		5	–	4	–	0
Rutgers		–		5	–	4	–	0
Tufts		–		5	–	4	–	0
Rhode Island State		–		4	–	4	–	0
NYU		–		4	–	5	–	0
Fordham		–		3	–	5	–	2
Geneva		–		4	–	6	–	0
Boston University		–		2	–	4	–	3
Lehigh		–		3	–	5	–	1
New Hampshire		–		3	–	5	–	1
Drexel		–		2	–	4	–	0
Temple		–		1	–	4	–	1
Buffalo		–		1	–	5	–	0
CCNY		–		1	–	6	–	0
Duquesne		–		0	–	8	–	0

The 1922 Colgate football team was an American football team that represented Colgate University as an independent during the 1922 college football season. In its first season under head coach Dick Harlow, the team compiled a 6–3 record and outscored opponents by a total of 297 to 62. Bernard Traynor was the team captain. The team played its home games on Whitnall Field in Hamilton, New York.

== Schedule ==
Date	Opponent	Site	Result	Attendance	Source
September 30	Clarkson	Whitnall Field; Hamilton, NY	W 50–6		
October 7	Allegheny	Whitnall Field; Hamilton, NY	W 19–0		
October 14	at Princeton	Palmer Stadium; Princeton, NJ	L 0–10		
October 21	at Cornell	Schoellkopf Field; Ithaca, NY (rivalry)	L 0–14		
October 28	Susquehanna	Whitnall Field; Hamilton, NY	W 87–6		
November 4	vs. Lehigh	Binghamton, NY	W 35–6		
November 11	Rochester	Whitnall Field; Hamilton, NY	W 40–0		
November 18	at Syracuse	Archbold Stadium; Syracuse, NY (rivalry)	L 7–14		
November 30	at Columbia	New York, NY	W 59–6	12,000	
