= 1922 Columbia Lions football team =

American college football season

1922 Columbia Lions football
- Conference: Independent
- Record: 5–4
- Head coach: Frank "Buck" O'Neill (3rd season)
- Captain: Walter Koppisch
- Home stadium: South Field, Polo Grounds

1922 Eastern college football independents records
	Conf.			Overall
Team	W	L	T	W		L		T
Cornell		–		8	–	0	–	0
Princeton		–		8	–	0	–	0
Army		–		8	–	0	–	2
Syracuse		–		6	–	1	–	2
Franklin & Marshall		–		8	–	2	–	0
Pittsburgh		–		8	–	2	–	0
Holy Cross		–		7	–	2	–	1
Harvard		–		7	–	2	–	0
Lafayette		–		7	–	2	–	0
Springfield		–		6	–	2	–	0
Boston College		–		6	–	2	–	1
Brown		–		6	–	2	–	1
Colgate		–		6	–	3	–	0
Dartmouth		–		6	–	3	–	0
Penn		–		6	–	3	–	0
Vermont		–		6	–	3	–	0
Washington & Jefferson		–		6	–	3	–	1
Yale		–		6	–	3	–	1
Bucknell		–		7	–	4	–	0
Penn State		–		6	–	4	–	1
Carnegie Tech		–		5	–	3	–	1
Villanova		–		5	–	3	–	1
Columbia		–		5	–	4	–	0
Rutgers		–		5	–	4	–	0
Tufts		–		5	–	4	–	0
Rhode Island State		–		4	–	4	–	0
NYU		–		4	–	5	–	0
Fordham		–		3	–	5	–	2
Geneva		–		4	–	6	–	0
Boston University		–		2	–	4	–	3
Lehigh		–		3	–	5	–	1
New Hampshire		–		3	–	5	–	1
Drexel		–		2	–	4	–	0
Temple		–		1	–	4	–	1
Buffalo		–		1	–	5	–	0
CCNY		–		1	–	6	–	0
Duquesne		–		0	–	8	–	0

The 1922 Columbia Lions football team was an American football team that represented Columbia University as an independent during the 1922 college football season. In his third and final season, head coach Frank "Buck" O'Neill led the team to a 5–4 record, though the Lions were outscored 183 to 147 by opponents.

The team played most of its home games on South Field, part of the university's campus in Morningside Heights in Upper Manhattan.

== Schedule ==
Date	Opponent	Site	Result	Attendance	Source
September 30	Ursinus	South Field; New York, NY	W 48–7	7,000	
October 7	Amherst	South Field; New York, NY	W 43–6	3,000	
October 14	Wesleyan	South Field; New York, NY	W 10–6	8,000	
October 21	NYU	South Field; New York, NY	W 6–2	11,000	
October 28	Williams	South Field; New York, NY	L 10–13	5,000	
November 4	at Cornell	Schoellkopf Field; Ithaca, NY (rivalry)	L 0–56	15,000	
November 11	Middlebury	South Field; New York, NY	W 17–6		
November 18	Dartmouth	Polo Grounds; New York, NY	L 7–28	6,500	
November 30	Colgate	South Field; New York, NY	L 6–59	12,000	
