= 1922 Holy Cross football team =

American college football season

1922 Holy Cross football
- Conference: Independent
- Record: 7–2–1
- Head coach: Cleo A. O'Donnell (4th season)
- Home stadium: Fitton Field

1922 Eastern college football independents records
| | Conf. | | | Overall |
| Team | W | L | T | W | | L | | T |
|---|---|---|---|---|---|---|---|---|
| Cornell | | – | | 8 | – | 0 | – | 0 |
| Princeton | | – | | 8 | – | 0 | – | 0 |
| Army | | – | | 8 | – | 0 | – | 2 |
| Syracuse | | – | | 6 | – | 1 | – | 2 |
| Franklin & Marshall | | – | | 8 | – | 2 | – | 0 |
| Pittsburgh | | – | | 8 | – | 2 | – | 0 |
| Holy Cross | | – | | 7 | – | 2 | – | 1 |
| Harvard | | – | | 7 | – | 2 | – | 0 |
| Lafayette | | – | | 7 | – | 2 | – | 0 |
| Springfield | | – | | 6 | – | 2 | – | 0 |
| Boston College | | – | | 6 | – | 2 | – | 1 |
| Brown | | – | | 6 | – | 2 | – | 1 |
| Colgate | | – | | 6 | – | 3 | – | 0 |
| Dartmouth | | – | | 6 | – | 3 | – | 0 |
| Penn | | – | | 6 | – | 3 | – | 0 |
| Vermont | | – | | 6 | – | 3 | – | 0 |
| Washington & Jefferson | | – | | 6 | – | 3 | – | 1 |
| Yale | | – | | 6 | – | 3 | – | 1 |
| Bucknell | | – | | 7 | – | 4 | – | 0 |
| Penn State | | – | | 6 | – | 4 | – | 1 |
| Carnegie Tech | | – | | 5 | – | 3 | – | 1 |
| Villanova | | – | | 5 | – | 3 | – | 1 |
| Columbia | | – | | 5 | – | 4 | – | 0 |
| Rutgers | | – | | 5 | – | 4 | – | 0 |
| Tufts | | – | | 5 | – | 4 | – | 0 |
| Rhode Island State | | – | | 4 | – | 4 | – | 0 |
| NYU | | – | | 4 | – | 5 | – | 0 |
| Fordham | | – | | 3 | – | 5 | – | 2 |
| Geneva | | – | | 4 | – | 6 | – | 0 |
| Boston University | | – | | 2 | – | 4 | – | 3 |
| Lehigh | | – | | 3 | – | 5 | – | 1 |
| New Hampshire | | – | | 3 | – | 5 | – | 1 |
| Drexel | | – | | 2 | – | 4 | – | 0 |
| Temple | | – | | 1 | – | 4 | – | 1 |
| Buffalo | | – | | 1 | – | 5 | – | 0 |
| CCNY | | – | | 1 | – | 6 | – | 0 |
| Duquesne | | – | | 0 | – | 8 | – | 0 |

The 1922 Holy Cross football team was an American football team that represented the College of the Holy Cross as an independent during the 1922 college football season. In its third season under head coach Cleo A. O'Donnell, the team compiled a 7–2–1 record. The team played its home games at Fitton Field in Worcester, Massachusetts.

== Schedule ==
| Date | Opponent | Site | Result | Attendance | Source |
|---|---|---|---|---|---|
| September 23 | New London Submarine Base | Fitton Field; Worcester, MA | W 19–6 | | |
| September 30 | Providence College | Fitton Field; Worcester, MA | W 33–3 | | |
| October 7 | at Harvard | Harvard Stadium; Boston, MA | L 0–20 | | |
| October 14 | Villanova | Fitton Field; Worcester, MA | W 14–0 | | |
| October 21 | Boston University | Fitton Field; Worcester, MA | T 7–7 | | |
| October 28 | Vermont | Fitton Field; Worcester, MA | W 6–0 | | |
| November 4 | at Georgetown | Griffith Stadium; Washington, DC | W 10–0 | | |
| November 11 | Springfield | Fitton Field; Worcester, MA | W 17–0 | | |
| November 18 | Fordham | Fitton Field; Worcester, MA | W 28–0 | | |
| December 2 | at Boston College | Braves Field; Boston, MA | L 13–17 | 54,000 | |
