= 1922 Geneva Covenanters football team =

American college football season

1922 Geneva Covenanters football
- Conference: Independent
- Record: 4–6
- Head coach: Robert Park (1st season)

1922 Eastern college football independents records
	Conf.			Overall
Team	W	L	T	W		L		T
Cornell		–		8	–	0	–	0
Princeton		–		8	–	0	–	0
Army		–		8	–	0	–	2
Syracuse		–		6	–	1	–	2
Franklin & Marshall		–		8	–	2	–	0
Pittsburgh		–		8	–	2	–	0
Holy Cross		–		7	–	2	–	1
Harvard		–		7	–	2	–	0
Lafayette		–		7	–	2	–	0
Springfield		–		6	–	2	–	0
Boston College		–		6	–	2	–	1
Brown		–		6	–	2	–	1
Colgate		–		6	–	3	–	0
Dartmouth		–		6	–	3	–	0
Penn		–		6	–	3	–	0
Vermont		–		6	–	3	–	0
Washington & Jefferson		–		6	–	3	–	1
Yale		–		6	–	3	–	1
Bucknell		–		7	–	4	–	0
Penn State		–		6	–	4	–	1
Carnegie Tech		–		5	–	3	–	1
Villanova		–		5	–	3	–	1
Columbia		–		5	–	4	–	0
Rutgers		–		5	–	4	–	0
Tufts		–		5	–	4	–	0
Rhode Island State		–		4	–	4	–	0
NYU		–		4	–	5	–	0
Fordham		–		3	–	5	–	2
Geneva		–		4	–	6	–	0
Boston University		–		2	–	4	–	3
Lehigh		–		3	–	5	–	1
New Hampshire		–		3	–	5	–	1
Drexel		–		2	–	4	–	0
Temple		–		1	–	4	–	1
Buffalo		–		1	–	5	–	0
CCNY		–		1	–	6	–	0
Duquesne		–		0	–	8	–	0

The 1922 Geneva Covenanters football team was an American football team that represented Geneva College as an independent during the 1922 college football season. Led by Robert Park in his first and only year as head coach, the team compiled a record of 4–6.

== Schedule ==
Date	Time	Opponent	Site	Result	Source
September 23		at Washington & Jefferson	Washington, PA	L 0–14	
September 30		Waynesburg	Geneva Field; Beaver Falls, PA	W 6–0	
October 7		at Carnegie Tech	Tech Field; Pittsburgh, PA	L 6–27	
October 14		Juniata	Geneva Field; Beaver Falls, PA	W 27–6	
October 21		at Westminster (PA)	New Wilmington, PA	W 32–0	
October 28		Duquesne	Geneva Field; Beaver Falls, PA	W 19–6	
November 4	2:30 p.m.	at Pittsburgh	Forbes Field; Pittsburgh, PA	L 0–62	
November 11		Thiel	Geneva Field; Beaver Falls, PA	L 3–25	
November 18		at Grove City	College Field; Grove City, PA	L 0–32	
November 25		Allegheny	Geneva Field; Beaver Falls, PA	L 7–27	
All times are in Eastern time
