= 1922 Rhode Island State football team =

American college football season

1922 Rhode Island State football
- Conference: Independent
- Record: 4–4
- Head coach: Frank Keaney (3rd season)

1922 Eastern college football independents records
	Conf.			Overall
Team	W	L	T	W		L		T
Cornell		–		8	–	0	–	0
Princeton		–		8	–	0	–	0
Army		–		8	–	0	–	2
Syracuse		–		6	–	1	–	2
Franklin & Marshall		–		8	–	2	–	0
Pittsburgh		–		8	–	2	–	0
Holy Cross		–		7	–	2	–	1
Harvard		–		7	–	2	–	0
Lafayette		–		7	–	2	–	0
Springfield		–		6	–	2	–	0
Boston College		–		6	–	2	–	1
Brown		–		6	–	2	–	1
Colgate		–		6	–	3	–	0
Dartmouth		–		6	–	3	–	0
Penn		–		6	–	3	–	0
Vermont		–		6	–	3	–	0
Washington & Jefferson		–		6	–	3	–	1
Yale		–		6	–	3	–	1
Bucknell		–		7	–	4	–	0
Penn State		–		6	–	4	–	1
Carnegie Tech		–		5	–	3	–	1
Villanova		–		5	–	3	–	1
Columbia		–		5	–	4	–	0
Rutgers		–		5	–	4	–	0
Tufts		–		5	–	4	–	0
Rhode Island State		–		4	–	4	–	0
NYU		–		4	–	5	–	0
Fordham		–		3	–	5	–	2
Geneva		–		4	–	6	–	0
Boston University		–		2	–	4	–	3
Lehigh		–		3	–	5	–	1
New Hampshire		–		3	–	5	–	1
Drexel		–		2	–	4	–	0
Temple		–		1	–	4	–	1
Buffalo		–		1	–	5	–	0
CCNY		–		1	–	6	–	0
Duquesne		–		0	–	8	–	0

The 1922 Rhode Island football team was an American football team that represented Rhode Island State College (later renamed the University of Rhode Island) as an independent during the 1922 college football season. In its third season under head coach Frank Keaney, the team compiled a 4–4 record.

== Schedule ==
Date	Opponent	Site	Result	Source
September 23	at Coast Guard	New London, CT	W 12–0	
September 30	at Brown	Andrews Field; Providence, RI (rivalry)	L 0–27	
October 14	St. Stephens	Kingston, RI	L 6–7	
October 21	Delaware	Kingston, RI	W 7–0	
October 28	at NYU	Ohio Field; Bronx, NY	L 7–23	
November 4	Worcester Tech	Kingston, RI	W 19–0	
November 11	Lowell Textile	Kingston, RI	L 3–6	
November 18	at Connecticut	Gardner Dow Athletic Fields; Storrs, CT (rivalry)	W 12–7	
