= 1922 Duquesne Dukes football team =

American college football season

1922 Duquesne Dukes football
- Conference: Independent
- Record: 0–8
- Head coach: Harold Ballin (1st season)

1922 Eastern college football independents records
	Conf.			Overall
Team	W	L	T	W		L		T
Cornell		–		8	–	0	–	0
Princeton		–		8	–	0	–	0
Army		–		8	–	0	–	2
Syracuse		–		6	–	1	–	2
Franklin & Marshall		–		8	–	2	–	0
Pittsburgh		–		8	–	2	–	0
Holy Cross		–		7	–	2	–	1
Harvard		–		7	–	2	–	0
Lafayette		–		7	–	2	–	0
Springfield		–		6	–	2	–	0
Boston College		–		6	–	2	–	1
Brown		–		6	–	2	–	1
Colgate		–		6	–	3	–	0
Dartmouth		–		6	–	3	–	0
Penn		–		6	–	3	–	0
Vermont		–		6	–	3	–	0
Washington & Jefferson		–		6	–	3	–	1
Yale		–		6	–	3	–	1
Bucknell		–		7	–	4	–	0
Penn State		–		6	–	4	–	1
Carnegie Tech		–		5	–	3	–	1
Villanova		–		5	–	3	–	1
Columbia		–		5	–	4	–	0
Rutgers		–		5	–	4	–	0
Tufts		–		5	–	4	–	0
Rhode Island State		–		4	–	4	–	0
NYU		–		4	–	5	–	0
Fordham		–		3	–	5	–	2
Geneva		–		4	–	6	–	0
Boston University		–		2	–	4	–	3
Lehigh		–		3	–	5	–	1
New Hampshire		–		3	–	5	–	1
Drexel		–		2	–	4	–	0
Temple		–		1	–	4	–	1
Buffalo		–		1	–	5	–	0
CCNY		–		1	–	6	–	0
Duquesne		–		0	–	8	–	0

The 1922 Duquesne Dukes football team represented Duquesne University during the 1922 college football season. The head coach was Harold Ballin, coaching his first season with the Dukes.

== Schedule ==
Date	Opponent	Site	Result	Source
August 31	Denison	Pittsburgh, PA	L 0–9	
October 7	at Detroit	University of Detroit Stadium; Detroit, MI	L 0–34	
October 14	Waynesburg	Pittsburgh, PA	L 0–6	
October 21	Marietta	Pittsburgh, PA	L 0–13	
October 28	at Geneva	Beaver Falls, PA	L 6–19	
November 4	West Virginia Wesleyan	Pittsburgh, PA	L 0–27	
November 11	at Grove City	Grove City, PA	L 0–7	
November 25	vs. Villanova	Philadelphia, PA	L 0–10	
