= 1922 Bucknell football team =

American college football season

1922 Bucknell football
- Conference: Independent
- Record: 7–4
- Head coach: Pete Reynolds (4th season)
- Home stadium: Tustin Field

1922 Eastern college football independents records
	Conf.			Overall
Team	W	L	T	W		L		T
Cornell		–		8	–	0	–	0
Princeton		–		8	–	0	–	0
Army		–		8	–	0	–	2
Syracuse		–		6	–	1	–	2
Franklin & Marshall		–		8	–	2	–	0
Pittsburgh		–		8	–	2	–	0
Holy Cross		–		7	–	2	–	1
Harvard		–		7	–	2	–	0
Lafayette		–		7	–	2	–	0
Springfield		–		6	–	2	–	0
Boston College		–		6	–	2	–	1
Brown		–		6	–	2	–	1
Colgate		–		6	–	3	–	0
Dartmouth		–		6	–	3	–	0
Penn		–		6	–	3	–	0
Vermont		–		6	–	3	–	0
Washington & Jefferson		–		6	–	3	–	1
Yale		–		6	–	3	–	1
Bucknell		–		7	–	4	–	0
Penn State		–		6	–	4	–	1
Carnegie Tech		–		5	–	3	–	1
Villanova		–		5	–	3	–	1
Columbia		–		5	–	4	–	0
Rutgers		–		5	–	4	–	0
Tufts		–		5	–	4	–	0
Rhode Island State		–		4	–	4	–	0
NYU		–		4	–	5	–	0
Fordham		–		3	–	5	–	2
Geneva		–		4	–	6	–	0
Boston University		–		2	–	4	–	3
Lehigh		–		3	–	5	–	1
New Hampshire		–		3	–	5	–	1
Drexel		–		2	–	4	–	0
Temple		–		1	–	4	–	1
Buffalo		–		1	–	5	–	0
CCNY		–		1	–	6	–	0
Duquesne		–		0	–	8	–	0

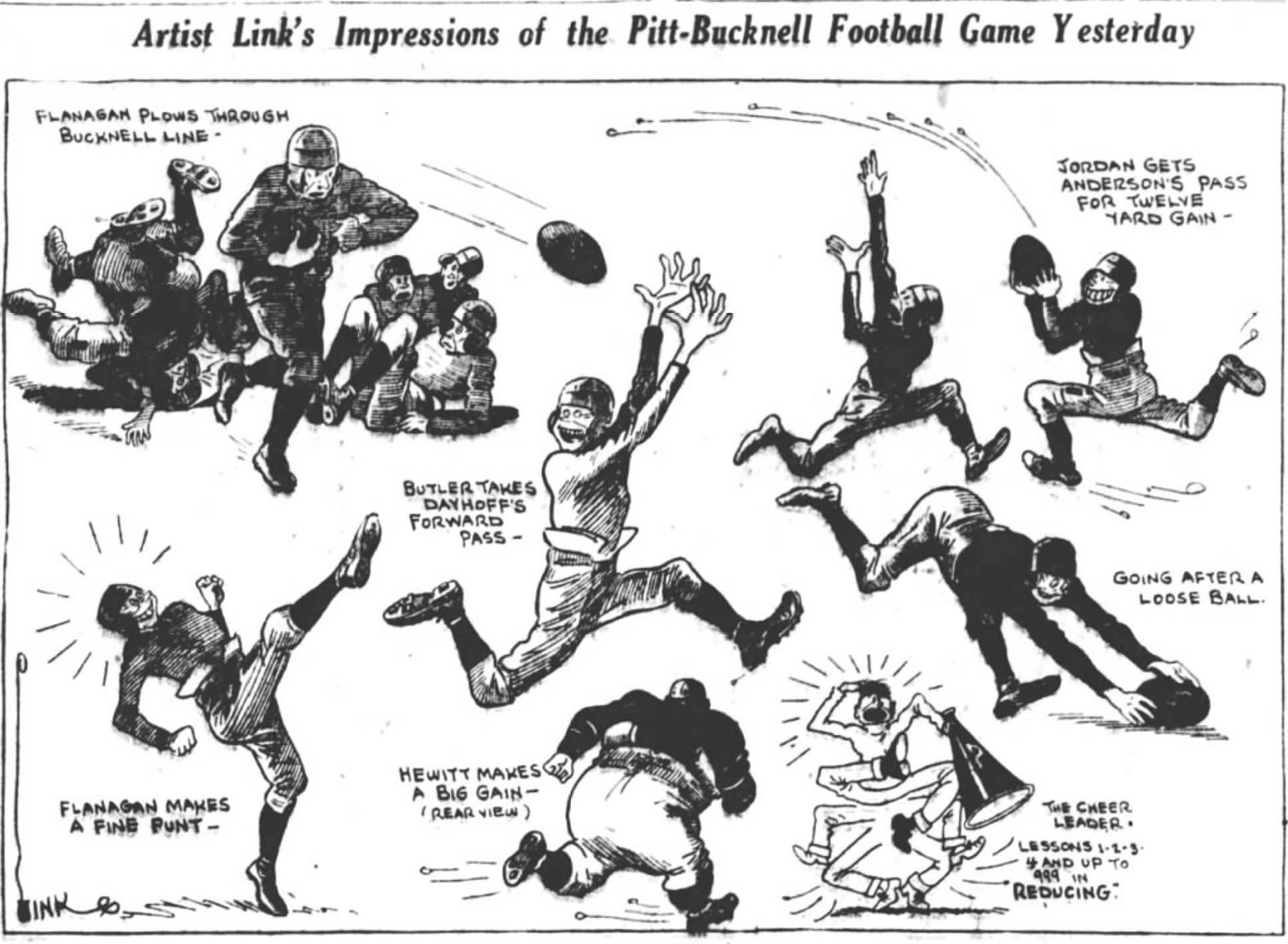
Artist's impression of the 1922 Pitt versus Bucknell Football Game

The 1922 Bucknell football team was an American football team that represented Bucknell University as an independent during the 1922 college football season. In its fourth season under head coach Pete Reynolds, the team compiled a 7–4 record. With 260 points scored, the team ranked sixth in the country in team scoring. The team played its home games at Tustin Field in Lewisburg, Pennsylvania.

== Schedule ==
Date	Opponent	Site	Result	Attendance	Source
September 23	Mansfield	Tustin Field; Lewisburg, PA	W 61–0		
September 30	Alfred	Tustin Field; Lewisburg, PA	W 41–0		
October 7	Susquehanna	Tustin Field; Lewisburg, PA	W 51–0		
October 14	at Navy	Worden Field; Annapolis, MD	L 7–14		
October 21	at Lafayette	March Field; Easton, PA	L 7–28		
October 28	at Pittsburgh	Forbes Field; Pittsburgh, PA	L 0–7	10,000	
November 4	Muhlenberg^{†}	Tustin Field; Lewisburg, PA	W 33–6		
November 11	at Lehigh	Taylor Stadium; Bethlehem, PA	W 14–0		
November 18	at Georgetown	Griffith Stadium; Washington, DC	L 7–19		
November 25	at Rutgers	Neilson Field; New Brunswick, NJ	W 20–13		
November 30	Dickinson	Tustin Field; Lewisburg, PA (Thanksgiving)	W 19–7		
^{†}Homecoming
