= 1922 NYU Violets football team =

American college football season

1922 NYU Violets football
- Conference: Independent
- Record: 4–5
- Head coach: Tom Thorp (1st season)
- Home stadium: Ohio Field

1922 Eastern college football independents records
	Conf.			Overall
Team	W	L	T	W		L		T
Cornell		–		8	–	0	–	0
Princeton		–		8	–	0	–	0
Army		–		8	–	0	–	2
Syracuse		–		6	–	1	–	2
Franklin & Marshall		–		8	–	2	–	0
Pittsburgh		–		8	–	2	–	0
Holy Cross		–		7	–	2	–	1
Harvard		–		7	–	2	–	0
Lafayette		–		7	–	2	–	0
Springfield		–		6	–	2	–	0
Boston College		–		6	–	2	–	1
Brown		–		6	–	2	–	1
Colgate		–		6	–	3	–	0
Dartmouth		–		6	–	3	–	0
Penn		–		6	–	3	–	0
Vermont		–		6	–	3	–	0
Washington & Jefferson		–		6	–	3	–	1
Yale		–		6	–	3	–	1
Bucknell		–		7	–	4	–	0
Penn State		–		6	–	4	–	1
Carnegie Tech		–		5	–	3	–	1
Villanova		–		5	–	3	–	1
Columbia		–		5	–	4	–	0
Rutgers		–		5	–	4	–	0
Tufts		–		5	–	4	–	0
Rhode Island State		–		4	–	4	–	0
NYU		–		4	–	5	–	0
Fordham		–		3	–	5	–	2
Geneva		–		4	–	6	–	0
Boston University		–		2	–	4	–	3
Lehigh		–		3	–	5	–	1
New Hampshire		–		3	–	5	–	1
Drexel		–		2	–	4	–	0
Temple		–		1	–	4	–	1
Buffalo		–		1	–	5	–	0
CCNY		–		1	–	6	–	0
Duquesne		–		0	–	8	–	0

The 1922 NYU Violets football team was an American football team that represented New York University as an independent during the 1922 college football season. In their first year under head coach Tom Thorp, the team compiled a 4–5 record. Prior to the start of the season, the Violets trained for ten days at Fort Slocum. In their final day of practice at the Fort, they played against a team of the Second Army Corps to a scoreless tie on September 25.

== Schedule ==
Date	Opponent	Site	Result	Attendance	Source
September 30	New York Aggies	Ohio Field; Bronx, NY	W 32–0		
October 7	at Syracuse	Archbold Stadium; Syracuse, NY	L 0–32		
October 14	Hobart	Ohio Field; Bronx, NY	L 0–20	3,000	
October 21	at Columbia	South Field; New York, NY	L 2–6	11,000	
October 28	Rhode Island State	Ohio Field; Bronx, NY	W 23–7		
November 4	Trinity (CT)	Ohio Field; Bronx, NY	W 13–0		
November 7	Fordham	Ohio Field; Bronx, NY	L 6–14	6,000	
November 11	CCNY	Ohio Field; Bronx, NY	W 7–0		
November 18	at Rutgers	Ashland Stadium; East Orange, NJ	L 0–37	6,000	
