= 1922 Springfield Red and White football team =

American college football season

1922 Springfield Red and White football
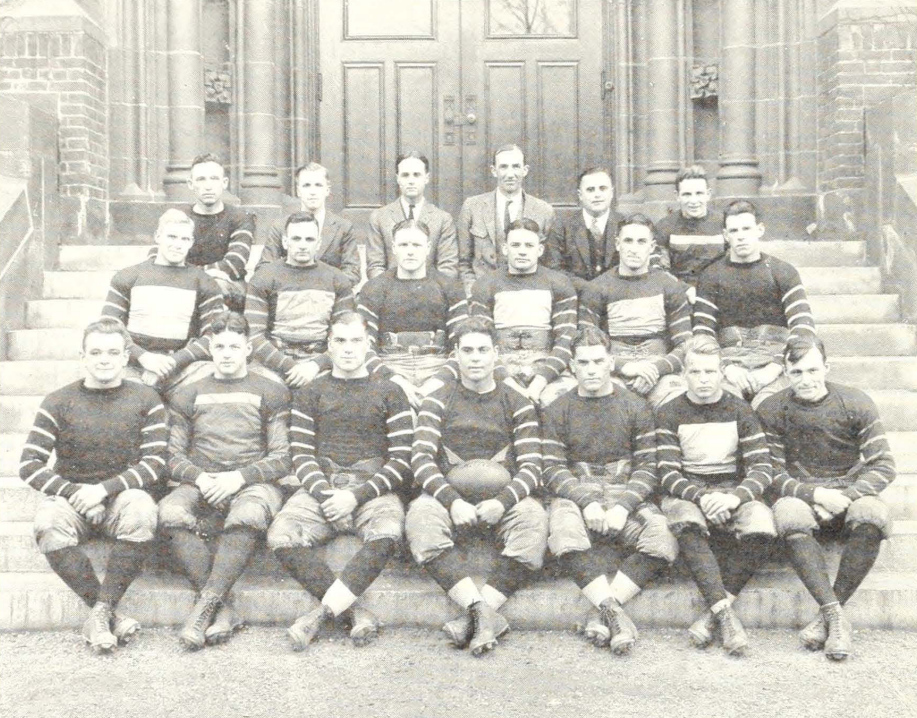
- Conference: Independent
- Record: 6–2
- Head coach: Edward J. Hickox (1st season)
- Captain: Frank G. Civiletto
- Home stadium: Pratt Field

1922 Eastern college football independents records
	Conf.			Overall
Team	W	L	T	W		L		T
Cornell		–		8	–	0	–	0
Princeton		–		8	–	0	–	0
Army		–		8	–	0	–	2
Syracuse		–		6	–	1	–	2
Franklin & Marshall		–		8	–	2	–	0
Pittsburgh		–		8	–	2	–	0
Holy Cross		–		7	–	2	–	1
Harvard		–		7	–	2	–	0
Lafayette		–		7	–	2	–	0
Springfield		–		6	–	2	–	0
Boston College		–		6	–	2	–	1
Brown		–		6	–	2	–	1
Colgate		–		6	–	3	–	0
Dartmouth		–		6	–	3	–	0
Penn		–		6	–	3	–	0
Vermont		–		6	–	3	–	0
Washington & Jefferson		–		6	–	3	–	1
Yale		–		6	–	3	–	1
Bucknell		–		7	–	4	–	0
Penn State		–		6	–	4	–	1
Carnegie Tech		–		5	–	3	–	1
Villanova		–		5	–	3	–	1
Columbia		–		5	–	4	–	0
Rutgers		–		5	–	4	–	0
Tufts		–		5	–	4	–	0
Rhode Island State		–		4	–	4	–	0
NYU		–		4	–	5	–	0
Fordham		–		3	–	5	–	2
Geneva		–		4	–	6	–	0
Boston University		–		2	–	4	–	3
Lehigh		–		3	–	5	–	1
New Hampshire		–		3	–	5	–	1
Drexel		–		2	–	4	–	0
Temple		–		1	–	4	–	1
Buffalo		–		1	–	5	–	0
CCNY		–		1	–	6	–	0
Duquesne		–		0	–	8	–	0

The 1922 Springfield Red and White football team was an American football team that represented Springfield College as an independent during the 1922 college football season. Led by first-year head coach Edward J. Hickox, Springfield compiled a record of 6–2.> Frank G. Civiletto was the team's captain. Springfield played its season opener against Colby at the Eastern States Exposition oval and the remainder of its home games at Pratt Field in Springfield, Massachusetts.

== Schedule ==
Date	Opponent	Site	Result	Attendance	Source
September 23	Colby	Eastern States Exposition oval; Springfield, MA	W 12–0		
September 30	at Army	The Plain; West Point, NY	L 0–35		
October 7	at Vermont	Centennial Field; Burlington, VT	W 7–0	2,500	
October 14	Connecticut	Pratt Field; Springfield, MA	W 24–7		
October 21	Stevens	Pratt Field; Springfield, MA	W 23–2		
October 28	Detroit	Pratt Field; Springfield, MA	W 6–0	5,000	
November 4	at Fordham	Fordham Field; Bronx, NY	W 17–0		
November 11	at Holy Cross	Fitton Field; Worcester, MA	L 0–17		
