= 1922 Rutgers Queensmen football team =

American college football season

1922 Rutgers Queensmen football
- Conference: Independent
- Record: 5–4
- Head coach: George Sanford (10th season)
- Home stadium: Neilson Field

1922 Eastern college football independents records
	Conf.			Overall
Team	W	L	T	W		L		T
Cornell		–		8	–	0	–	0
Princeton		–		8	–	0	–	0
Army		–		8	–	0	–	2
Syracuse		–		6	–	1	–	2
Franklin & Marshall		–		8	–	2	–	0
Pittsburgh		–		8	–	2	–	0
Holy Cross		–		7	–	2	–	1
Harvard		–		7	–	2	–	0
Lafayette		–		7	–	2	–	0
Springfield		–		6	–	2	–	0
Boston College		–		6	–	2	–	1
Brown		–		6	–	2	–	1
Colgate		–		6	–	3	–	0
Dartmouth		–		6	–	3	–	0
Penn		–		6	–	3	–	0
Vermont		–		6	–	3	–	0
Washington & Jefferson		–		6	–	3	–	1
Yale		–		6	–	3	–	1
Bucknell		–		7	–	4	–	0
Penn State		–		6	–	4	–	1
Carnegie Tech		–		5	–	3	–	1
Villanova		–		5	–	3	–	1
Columbia		–		5	–	4	–	0
Rutgers		–		5	–	4	–	0
Tufts		–		5	–	4	–	0
Rhode Island State		–		4	–	4	–	0
NYU		–		4	–	5	–	0
Fordham		–		3	–	5	–	2
Geneva		–		4	–	6	–	0
Boston University		–		2	–	4	–	3
Lehigh		–		3	–	5	–	1
New Hampshire		–		3	–	5	–	1
Drexel		–		2	–	4	–	0
Temple		–		1	–	4	–	1
Buffalo		–		1	–	5	–	0
CCNY		–		1	–	6	–	0
Duquesne		–		0	–	8	–	0

The 1922 Rutgers Queensmen football team represented Rutgers University as an independent during the 1922 college football season. In their 10th season under head coach George Sanford, the Queensmen compiled a 5–4 record and outscored their opponents, 133 to 117. Sanford was inducted into the College Football Hall of Fame in 1971.

== Schedule ==
Date	Opponent	Site	Result	Attendance	Source
September 30	Pennsylvania Military	Neilson Field; New Brunswick, NJ	W 13–0		
October 7	Fordham	Neilson Field; New Brunswick, NJ	W 20–15		
October 14	at Lehigh	Bethlehem, PA	W 13–7		
October 21	Bethany (WV)	Neilson Field; New Brunswick, NJ	L 7–14		
October 28	at West Virginia	Morgantown, WV	L 0–28	6,000	
November 7	vs. LSU	Polo Grounds; New York, NY	W 25–0		
November 11	Lafayette	Neilson Field; New Brunswick, NJ	L 6–33		
November 18	NYU	Ashland Stadium; East Orange, NJ	W 37–0		
November 25	Bucknell	Neilson Field; New Brunswick, NJ	L 13–20		
