= 1922 New Hampshire football team =

American college football season

1922 New Hampshire football
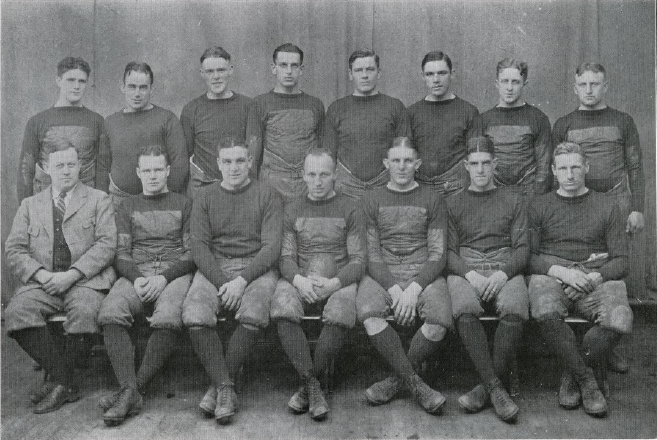
- Conference: Independent
- Record: 3–5–1
- Head coach: Butch Cowell (7th season)
- Captain: Earl P. Farmer
- Home stadium: Memorial Field

1922 Eastern college football independents records
| | Conf. | | | Overall |
| Team | W | L | T | W | | L | | T |
|---|---|---|---|---|---|---|---|---|
| Cornell | | – | | 8 | – | 0 | – | 0 |
| Princeton | | – | | 8 | – | 0 | – | 0 |
| Army | | – | | 8 | – | 0 | – | 2 |
| Syracuse | | – | | 6 | – | 1 | – | 2 |
| Franklin & Marshall | | – | | 8 | – | 2 | – | 0 |
| Pittsburgh | | – | | 8 | – | 2 | – | 0 |
| Holy Cross | | – | | 7 | – | 2 | – | 1 |
| Harvard | | – | | 7 | – | 2 | – | 0 |
| Lafayette | | – | | 7 | – | 2 | – | 0 |
| Springfield | | – | | 6 | – | 2 | – | 0 |
| Boston College | | – | | 6 | – | 2 | – | 1 |
| Brown | | – | | 6 | – | 2 | – | 1 |
| Colgate | | – | | 6 | – | 3 | – | 0 |
| Dartmouth | | – | | 6 | – | 3 | – | 0 |
| Penn | | – | | 6 | – | 3 | – | 0 |
| Vermont | | – | | 6 | – | 3 | – | 0 |
| Washington & Jefferson | | – | | 6 | – | 3 | – | 1 |
| Yale | | – | | 6 | – | 3 | – | 1 |
| Bucknell | | – | | 7 | – | 4 | – | 0 |
| Penn State | | – | | 6 | – | 4 | – | 1 |
| Carnegie Tech | | – | | 5 | – | 3 | – | 1 |
| Villanova | | – | | 5 | – | 3 | – | 1 |
| Columbia | | – | | 5 | – | 4 | – | 0 |
| Rutgers | | – | | 5 | – | 4 | – | 0 |
| Tufts | | – | | 5 | – | 4 | – | 0 |
| Rhode Island State | | – | | 4 | – | 4 | – | 0 |
| NYU | | – | | 4 | – | 5 | – | 0 |
| Fordham | | – | | 3 | – | 5 | – | 2 |
| Geneva | | – | | 4 | – | 6 | – | 0 |
| Boston University | | – | | 2 | – | 4 | – | 3 |
| Lehigh | | – | | 3 | – | 5 | – | 1 |
| New Hampshire | | – | | 3 | – | 5 | – | 1 |
| Drexel | | – | | 2 | – | 4 | – | 0 |
| Temple | | – | | 1 | – | 4 | – | 1 |
| Buffalo | | – | | 1 | – | 5 | – | 0 |
| CCNY | | – | | 1 | – | 6 | – | 0 |
| Duquesne | | – | | 0 | – | 8 | – | 0 |

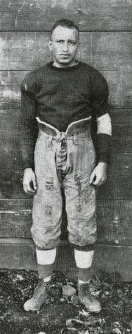
Team captain Earl P. Farmer c. 1919, in the annual college yearbook

The 1922 New Hampshire football team (Note: The school did not adopt the Wildcats nickname until February 1926; before then, they were generally referred to as "the blue and white".) was an American football team that represented New Hampshire College of Agriculture and the Mechanic Arts (Note: The school was often referred to as New Hampshire College or New Hampshire State College in newspapers of the era.) during the 1922 college football season—the school became the University of New Hampshire in 1923. In its seventh season under head coach William "Butch" Cowell, (Note: This was Cowell's 8th year and 7th season as head coach, as the school did not field a varsity team in 1918 due to World War I.) the team compiled a 3–5–1 record, and were outscored by their opponents by a total of 180 to 105. After opening the season with three wins, the team had a five-game losing streak before ending the season with a tie. The team played its home games in Durham, New Hampshire, at Memorial Field. (Note: Memorial Field remains in use by the New Hampshire women's field hockey team.)

== Schedule ==
| Date | Opponent | Site | Result | Attendance | Source |
|---|---|---|---|---|---|
| September 23 | USMC Portsmouth | Memorial Field; Durham, NH | W 40–0 | | |
| September 30 | Bates | Memorial Field; Durham, NH | W 21–7 | 2,000 | |
| October 7 | Norwich | Memorial Field; Durham, NH | W 7–0 | | |
| October 14 | at Cornell | Schoellkopf Field; Ithaca, NY | L 7–68 | | |
| October 21 | at Army | The Plain; West Point, NY | L 0–33 | | |
| October 28 | at Massachusetts | Alumni Field; Amherst, MA (rivalry) | L 10–12 | | |
| November 4 | Vermont^{†} | Memorial Field; Durham, NH | L 0–33 | 5,000 | |
| November 11 | vs. Maine | Textile Field; Manchester, NH (rivalry) | L 7–14 | | |
| November 18 | Boston University | Memorial Field; Durham, NH | T 13–13 | | |
^{†}Homecoming; Source:

The USMC Portsmouth team was composed of Marine Corps personnel working at the Portsmouth Naval Prison in nearby Kittery, Maine. While contemporary news reports and The Granite yearbook described it as a "practice game", the result is listed by College Football Data Warehouse and the Wildcats' media guide.

The 1922 game remains the only time that the New Hampshire and Cornell football programs have met. New Hampshire and Massachusetts (commonly known as UMass since the late 1940s) next met in 1952. New Hampshire and Army next met in 2008.
