= Balch =

Balch may refer to:

== People with the surname ==
=== Academics ===
- Herbert E. Balch (1869–1958), British archaeologist and caver
- Jennifer Balch American wildfire scientist
- Pamela Balch, president of West Virginia Wesleyan College
- Reg Balch (1894–1994), British Canadian photographer and scientist
- Robert W. Balch (born 1945), American sociologist
- Stephen Balch, American scholar
- Thomas Balch (historian) (1821–1877), American historian

=== Military ===
- George Beall Balch (1821–1908), American naval officer
- John Henry Balch (1896–1980), US Navy
- Joseph Pope Balch (1822–1872), American Civil War veteran of Rhode Island

=== Others ===
- Albert V. Balch (1828–1915), American politician
- Alfred Balch (1785–1853), American businessman, lawyer, political advisor, and judge
- Antony Balch (1937–1980), British film director
- Clifford Balch (1880–1963), American architect
- Emily Greene Balch (1867–1961), American pacifist and Nobel Peace Prize recipient
- Hezekiah Balch (1741–1810), Presbyterian minister
- Hezekiah J. Balch (d. c. 1818), Mississippi territorial and state legislator
- John Balch, builder of the John Balch House (1679), in Beverly, Massachusetts
- Oscar B. Balch, American decorator who built the Oscar B. Balch House (1911) by Frank Lloyd Wright
- Stephen Bloomer Balch (1747–1833), American Presbyterian minister
- William Ralston Balch (1852–1923), American journalist and author

== Places ==
- Balch (crater), on Venus
- Balkh, alternatively Balch, an ancient city in Afghanistan
- Balch Cave in the Mendip Hills, Somerset, England
- Balch Creek in Portland, Oregon
- Balch Fieldhouse, arena in Boulder, Colorado
- Balch Hall, at Cornell University
- George Balch House, a registered historic building
- Balch Pond, on the Maine-New Hampshire border
- Balch Springs, Texas

== Vessels ==
- USS Balch (DD-363)
- USS Balch (DD-50)

== Other uses ==
- Balch & Bingham, a law firm in Birmingham, Alabama
- Balch Institute for Ethnic Studies at the Historical Society of Pennsylvania in Philadelphia

== See also ==
- Balché, a mildly intoxicating Mayan drink
