= William Flanagan =

William Flanagan may refer to:

- William Flanagan (composer) (1923–1969), American composer
- William Flanagan (American football) (1901–1975), professional football player
- William Flanagan (politician) (1871–1944), British Member of Parliament for Manchester Clayton, 1931–1935
- William J. Flanagan Jr. (born 1943), U.S. Navy admiral
- William A. Flanagan (born 1980), former mayor of Fall River, Massachusetts

== See also ==
- Bill Flanagan (disambiguation)
