= 1922 Pittsburgh Panthers football team =

American college football season

1922 Pittsburgh Panthers football
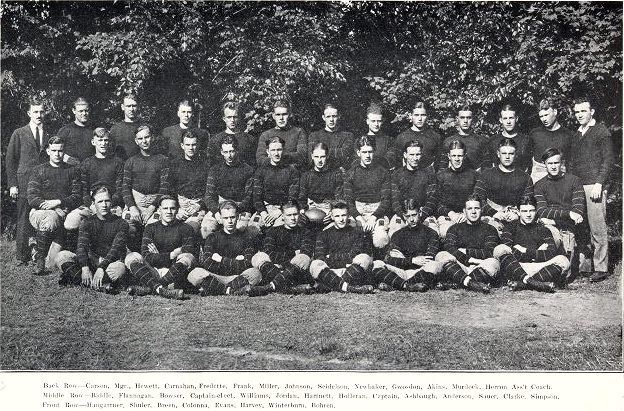
- Conference: Independent
- Record: 8–2
- Head coach: Pop Warner (8th season)
- Captain: Tom Holleran
- Home stadium: Forbes Field

Uniform
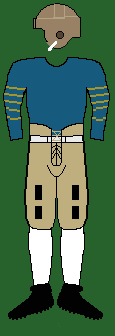

1922 Eastern college football independents records
	Conf.			Overall
Team	W	L	T	W		L		T
Cornell		–		8	–	0	–	0
Princeton		–		8	–	0	–	0
Army		–		8	–	0	–	2
Syracuse		–		6	–	1	–	2
Franklin & Marshall		–		8	–	2	–	0
Pittsburgh		–		8	–	2	–	0
Holy Cross		–		7	–	2	–	1
Harvard		–		7	–	2	–	0
Lafayette		–		7	–	2	–	0
Springfield		–		6	–	2	–	0
Boston College		–		6	–	2	–	1
Brown		–		6	–	2	–	1
Colgate		–		6	–	3	–	0
Dartmouth		–		6	–	3	–	0
Penn		–		6	–	3	–	0
Vermont		–		6	–	3	–	0
Washington & Jefferson		–		6	–	3	–	1
Yale		–		6	–	3	–	1
Bucknell		–		7	–	4	–	0
Penn State		–		6	–	4	–	1
Carnegie Tech		–		5	–	3	–	1
Villanova		–		5	–	3	–	1
Columbia		–		5	–	4	–	0
Rutgers		–		5	–	4	–	0
Tufts		–		5	–	4	–	0
Rhode Island State		–		4	–	4	–	0
NYU		–		4	–	5	–	0
Fordham		–		3	–	5	–	2
Geneva		–		4	–	6	–	0
Boston University		–		2	–	4	–	3
Lehigh		–		3	–	5	–	1
New Hampshire		–		3	–	5	–	1
Drexel		–		2	–	4	–	0
Temple		–		1	–	4	–	1
Buffalo		–		1	–	5	–	0
CCNY		–		1	–	6	–	0
Duquesne		–		0	–	8	–	0

The 1922 Pittsburgh Panthers football team was an American football team that represented the University of Pittsburgh as an independent during the 1922 college football season. In its eighth season under head coach Pop Warner, the team compiled an 8–2 record, shut out five of its ten opponents, and outscored all opponents by a total of 190 to 43. The team played its home games at Forbes Field in Pittsburgh.

== Schedule ==
Date	Opponent	Site	Result	Attendance	Source
September 30	at Cincinnati	Carson Field; Cincinnati, OH	W 37–0		
October 7	Lafayette	Forbes Field; Pittsburgh, PA	L 0–7	15,000	
October 14	West Virginia	Forbes Field; Pittsburgh, PA (rivalry)	L 6–9	15,000	
October 21	at Syracuse	Archbold Stadium; Syracuse, NY	W 21–14	25,000	
October 28	Bucknell	Forbes Field; Pittsburgh, PA	W 7–0	10,000	
November 4	Geneva	Forbes Field; Pittsburgh, PA	W 62–0		
November 11	at Penn	Franklin Field; Philadelphia, PA	W 7–6	40,000	
November 18	Washington & Jefferson	Forbes Field; Pittsburgh, PA	W 19–0	35,000	
November 30	Penn State	Forbes Field; Pittsburgh, PA (rivalry)	W 14–0	33,000	
December 30	at Stanford	Stanford Stadium; Stanford, CA	W 16–7	6,000	

== Preseason ==
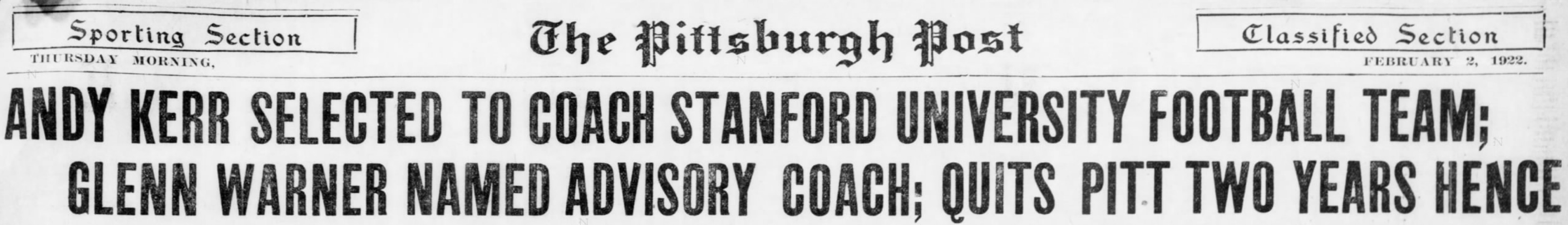
Surprise Headline for Pitt Fans

On February 1, 1922 Glenn S. Warner accepted a coaching offer from Stanford University. While he fulfills the last two years of his contract with Pitt, he will serve as advisory coach to Stanford. Andy Kerr, freshman football and varsity basketball coach at Pitt, will be acting head coach for the two year period and Claude Thornhill will be his assistant. Coach Warner will be at Stanford for spring practice but will return to Pitt for the start of training at Camp Hamilton in September. "The action of both Kerr and Warner in lining up with the western school was a great surprise to their friends here, and to the athletic authorities at Pitt, who had no idea of any such denouement."

Dr. H. Clifford Carlson was named freshman football coach by the University Athletic Council on March 9. "Red" graduated from Medical School in 1920. He was a three sport letter-winning athlete while at Pitt playing football (Captain of the undefeated 1917 team), basketball and baseball. Carlson coached the 1920 freshman baseball team to a 7–3 record. On May 10, the Athletic Council named him varsity basketball coach (a position he would hold for 31 years).

A new contract with Forbes Field was signed. It forbade the Pitt football team using the field for practice, so the Engineering Department built a practice facility on the hill for approximately $12,000. "In addition to the new practice field, the Athletic Committee is erecting a dressing room adjacent to the indoor track which will provide room for equipment, rubbing room, general dressing room, showers, toilets, etc. The whole layout is on a par with that at any other school in the United States, and while not what could be termed 'real' fancy, certainly should take care of all the needs of the football men in splendid manner." The new facility will keep Forbes Field in better shape for games.

The nine game schedule arranged by graduate manager Karl E. Davis mimicked the 1921 slate except that Bucknell replaced Nebraska. On September 24 The Pittsburgh Press reported that a tenth game was added to the schedule. The Panthers would play at Stanford on December 30 in the new Stanford Bowl. "Coach Warner saw the trip as an opportunity to see the progress being made by assistants Kerr and Thornhill, and evaluate the talent of the Stanford players in game conditions."

Training at Camp Hamilton commenced on September 5 and ended on the 23rd. Thirty-six men were eligible to compete for positions on the 1922 roster. Three men with varsity experience (halfbacks, Frank Byers and Charles Williams, and end Paul Youngk) were ineligible due to scholastic deficiencies. Two other veterans turned in their pads. Halfback William Robush opted to concentrate on track and end Jack Clawson accepted a position as Athletic Director at Norwin High School.

== Coaching staff ==
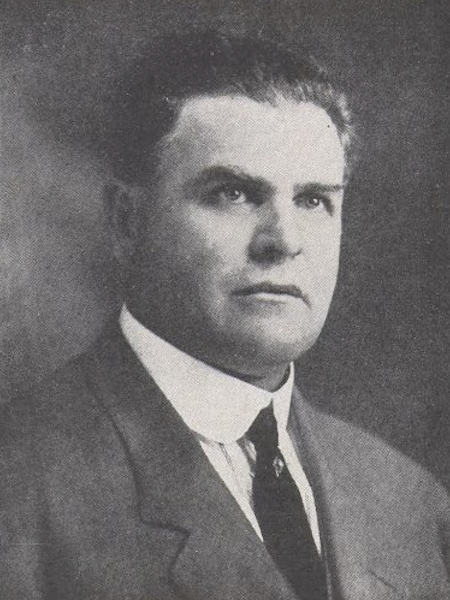
Coach Warner

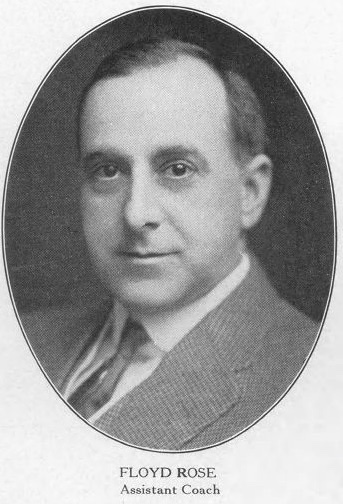
Floyd Rose

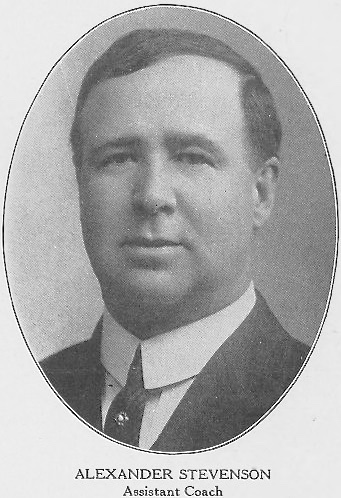
Alexander Stevenson

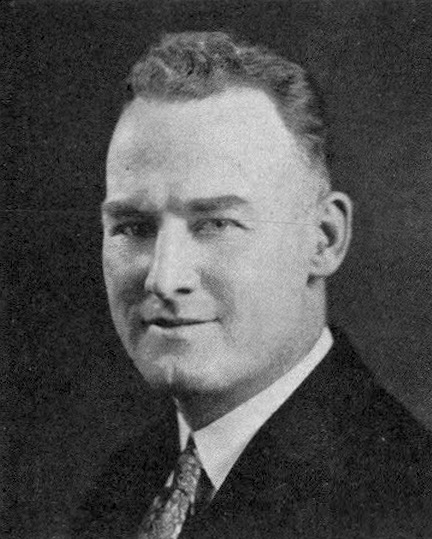
H. Clifford Carlson

1922 Pittsburgh Panthers football staff
Coaching staff: Pop Warner – Head coach; Floyd Rose – Assistant coach; Alexander Stevenson – Assistant coach; H. Clifford Carlson – Freshman coach	Support staff: George I. Carson – student football manager; J. Huber Wagner – team physician; Ollie DeVictor – team trainer; Karl E. Davis – graduate manager of athletics; Charles S. Miller – director of athletics

== Roster ==
1922 Pittsburgh Panthers football roster
Player	Position	Games	Height	Weight	Class	Prep School	Hometown
Tom Holleran*	quarterback	3	5' 7"	160	1923	The Kiski School	Pittsburgh, PA
Harold Akins	tackle	0	5' 10"	198	1925	Bellefonte Academy	Alliance, Ohio
John Anderson*	halfback	10	5' 9"	160	1923	Ben Avon H. S.	Ben Avon, PA
William Ashbaugh*	center	7	5' 10"	170	1925	Bellefonte Academy	Washington, PA
Kenneth Biddle	guard	1	5' 10"	196	1924	Crafton H. S.	Crafton, PA
Karl Bohren*	halfback	6	5' 8"	157	1925	Reynoldsville H. S.	Reynoldsville, PA
Charles Bowser*	center	10	5' 11"	172	1923	Johnstown H. S.	Johnstown, PA
James Breen	center	1	5' 7"	168	1925	New Brighton H. S.	New Brighton, PA
Roy Brubaker	guard	1	5' 7"	168	1923	Knoxville Union H. S.	Pittsburgh, PA
Cronje Carnahan	guard	2	5' 11"	195	1925	Bellefonte Academy	Fayetteville, AR
John W. Clark*	guard	8	5' 10"	206	1923	Allegheny H. S.	Pittsburgh, PA
Nicolas Colonna*	fullback	7	5' 8"	167	1924	Woodlawn H. S.	Woodlawn, PA
John W. Evans	halfback	2	5' 6"	155	1925	Duquesne H. S.	Duquesne, PA
William Flanagan*	quarterback	10	6'	160	1925	Buckhannon H. S.(WV)	Buckhannon, WV
Noble Frank*	tackle	7	6'	177	1925	Harrisburg Central H. S.	Harrisburg, PA
Edmund Fredette*	center	5	5' 11"	188	1924	The Kiski School	Wilkinsburg, PA
W. Cullen Gourley*	tackle	9	5' 10"	200	1924	Punxutawney H. S.	Punxutawney, PA
Milo Gwosden*	end	6	6'	176	1925	Indiana Normal	Woodlawn, PA
William Haines	end	2	6'	160	1924	Crafton H. S.	Crafton, PA
Ulhard Hangartner	guard	3	5' 11"	186	1925	Schenley H. S.	Pittsburgh, PA
Mike Hartnett	halfback	2	5' 11"	158	1923	Johnstown H. S.	Johnstown, PA
Charles Harvey	end	1	5' 8"	160	1925	Beaver Falls H. S.	Beaver Falls, PA
Orville Hewitt*	fullback	10	5' 10"	199	1923	Wilkinsburg H. S.	Wilkinsburg, PA
Marsh Johnson*	fullback	4	6' 2"	180	1925	Bellefonte Academy	Jamestown, NY
Lloyd Jordan*	end	10	5' 10"	178	1924	Punxutawney H. S.	Punxutawney PA
John Miller*	guard	5	6' 1"	230	1923	Mount Union H. S.	Mount Union, PA
Thomas Murdoch*	tackle	5	5' 11"	183	1925	Schenley H.S.	Pittsburgh PA
Edward J. Newbaker	tackle	1	6'	188	1925	Staunton Mil. Acad.(VA)	Windber, PA
Thola Noon	tackle	0	5' 10"	170	1925	Scottdale H. S.	Scottdale, PA
John B. Sack*	tackle	10	6' 2"	185	1923	Fifth Avenue H. S.	Pittsburgh, PA
Carl Sauer*	end	10	5' 11"	166	1925	West Central H. S.(Cleveland)	Cleveland, OH
Harry Seidelson*	guard	6	6' 1"	184	1924	Fifth Avenue H. S.	Pittsburgh, PA
Nick Shuler*	quarterback	7	5' 11"	178	1924	Elwood City H. S.	Elwood City, PA
Richard M. Simpson*	tackle	10	5' 11"	186	1923	Huntingdon H. S.	Huntingdon, PA
Frank W. Williams*	end	10	6' 2"	173	1923	The Kiski School	Parnassus, PA
J. Charles Winterburn*	halfback	8	5' 6"	176	1923	Elizabeth H. S.	Elizabeth, PA
George I. Carson*	manager				1923	Peabody H. S.	Pittsburgh, PA
* Letterman

== Game summaries ==
=== At Cincinnati ===
Week 1: Pitt at Cincinnati

Team	1	2	3	4	Total
• Pitt	7	6	12	12	37
Cincinnati	0	0	0	0	0

- Date: September 30, 1922
- Location: Carson Field
  Cincinnati, OH
- Game start: 2:30 p.m.
- Referee: E. J. Ryan (Michigan)

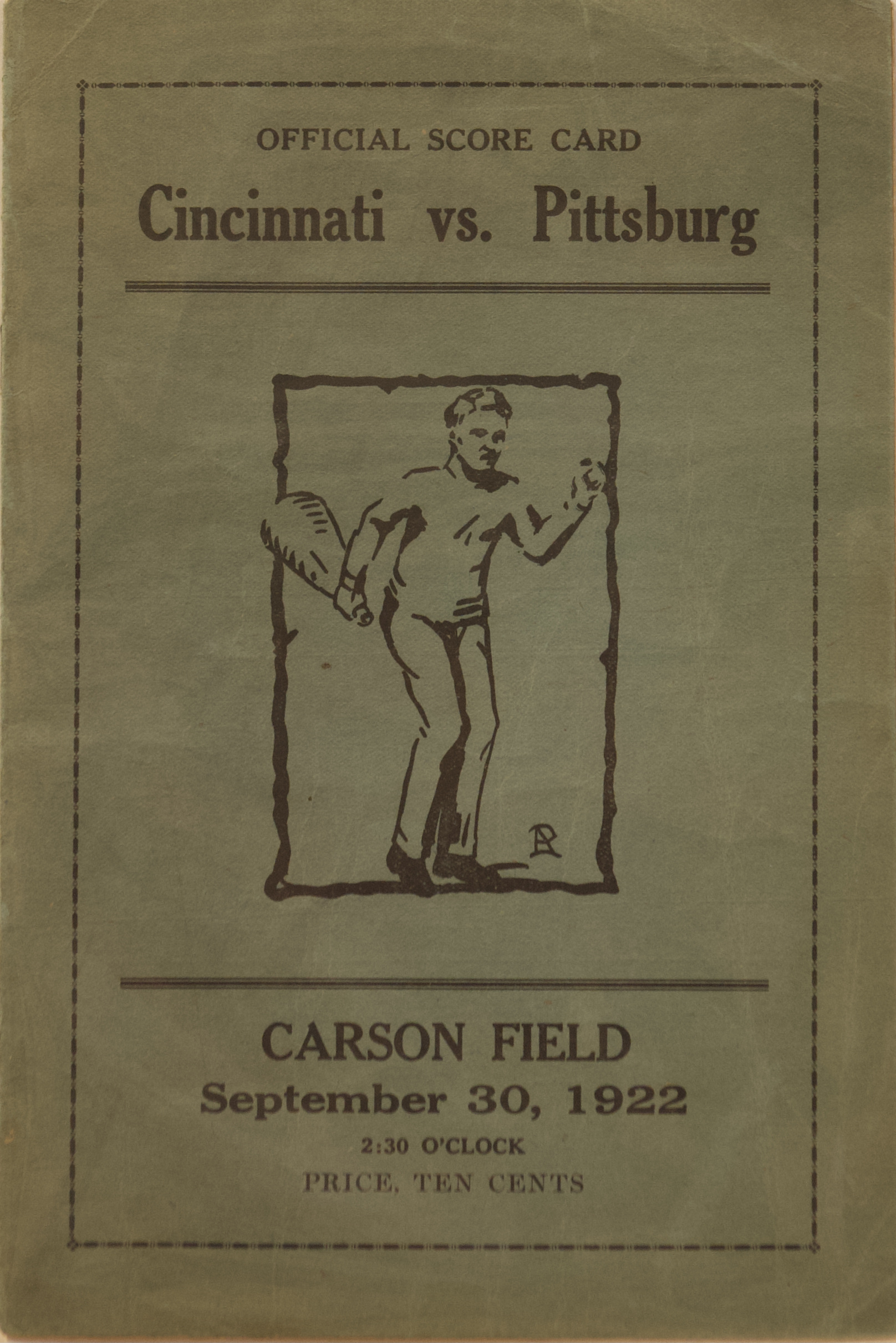
Program for September 30, 1922 Cincinnati vs. Pitt game

The opening game of the 1922 season was against the Cincinnati Bearcats led by first year coach George McLaren. McLaren played for Warner at Pitt from 1915 to 1918 and captained the 1918 team. He started his coaching career at Kansas State Normal College in 1919 and then moved to Arkansas for the 1920 and 1921 seasons.

The Bearcat lineup included a number of players from last year's squad. Their fullback and captain, Mike Palmer, was declared eligible after some scholastic difficulty and inserted into the lineup.

After the scare Cincinnati gave the Panthers last year, Coach Warner jogged their memory: "Some of you fellows remember that Cincinnati handed us a surprise package last fall on our own grounds," said Warner. "We defeated them, but not by a very creditable score. They will be much harder to beat today, and any lapses on your part are liable to prove fatal to our chances. I want every man to go in there to fight from the first whistle until the game is over, and, if I find any man doing less than what I considered his best, he will be yanked without ceremony."

Charles Bowser started at quarterback and captain Tom Holleran rested his ankle for the Lafayette game. Tackles Ulhard Hangartner and Edmund Fredette, center John Miller and halfback William Flanagan started their first game for the varsity.

The Panthers obeyed their coach and routed the hapless Bearcats 37–0. Six touchdowns were scored with John Anderson and Carl Sauer each tallying two. Orville Hewitt and Karl Bohren added one each. "The feature play of the game came late in the fourth quarter, when Bohren broke away around left end and then cut over to the right side of the field and ran 53 yards to the goal line."

The glaring negative of the game was the inability to convert extra points. Frank Williams converted his first and then missed the second. Karl Bohren, Milo Gwosden (2) and Charles Winterburn all failed on their attempts.

Cincinnati finished the season with a 1–7–1 record.

The Pitt lineup for the game against Cincinnati was Lloyd Jordan (left end), Ulhard Hangartner (left tackle), John Clark (left guard), John Miller (center), Jack Sack (right guard), Edmund Fredette (right tackle), Frank Williams (right end), Charles Bowser (quarterback), William Flanagan (left halfback), John Anderson (right halfback) and Nick Colonna (fullback). Substitutes appearing in the game for Pitt were Richard Simpson, William Ashbaugh, Nick Shuler, Carl Sauer, Milo Gwosden, Orville Hewitt, Karl Bohren, Charles Winterburn and Noble Frank.

=== Lafayette ===
Week 2: Lafayette at Pitt

Team	1	2	3	4	Total
• Lafayette	0	0	7	0	7
Pitt	0	0	0	0	0

- Date: October 7, 1922
- Location: Forbes Field
  Pittsburgh, PA
- Game start: 3:00 p.m.
- Game attendance: 15,000
- Referee: E. J. O'Brien (Tufts)

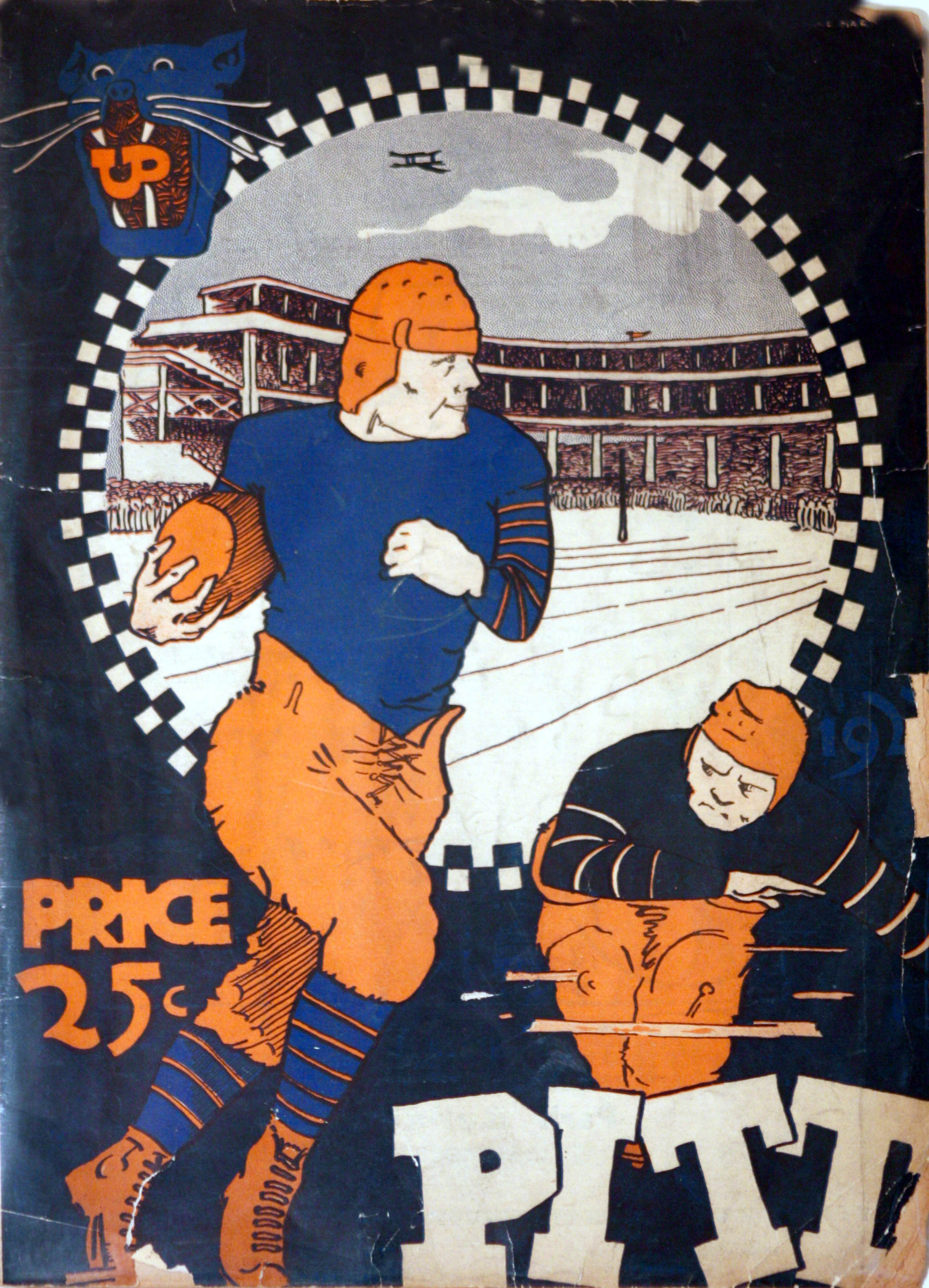
Program for October 7, 1922 Pitt vs. Lafayette game

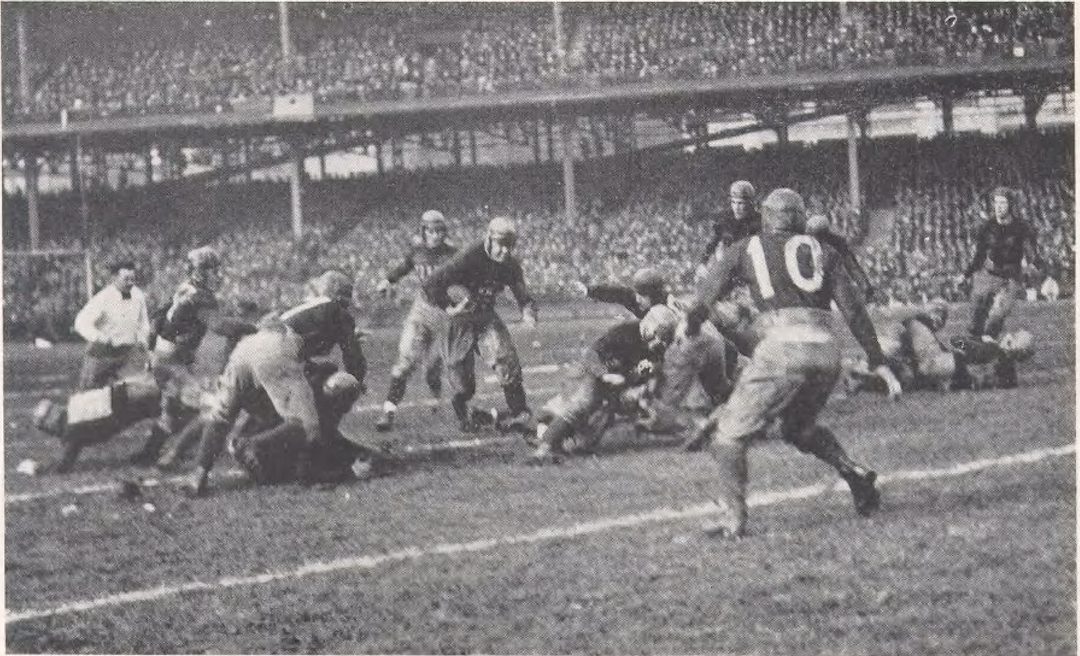
Photo of 1922 Pitt football game

The second game and home opener of the season was against the Lafayette Leopards from Easton, PA. The Leopards were coached by three members of the Warner coaching tree – head man John B. Sutherland, and his assistants - Fred Seidel and Ralph Gougler. The Leopards were on a thirteen game winning streak and were the defending National Champions. Coach Sutherland had a strong team led by Walter Camp first team All-American guard Frank Schwab. Halfback Leonard Brunner and end Charlie Berry also received postseason honors.

After last season's victory - " 'Do It Again' is the motto of the Eastonians in regard to the Pitt game." " 'We are going out to Pittsburgh to win,' said Coach Dr. Jock Sutherland, standing on the steps of the train. 'Pittsburgh has been preparing for Saturday's game since we defeated them here on March Field last October. We realize Pitt's great strength and are not overconfident. We know we must fight for every yard we gain. Lafayette is in fine physical condition. ...We are prepared to put up a wonderful fight'."

Coach Warner has been pointing to this game for a year. In his time at Pitt no team has beaten him two years in a row. "The Warnerites are primed for the fray. The importance has been dinned into their ears ever since their first practice session." The Panthers are healthy and want revenge for the 6–0 setback received in Easton last season.

The Pitt student body was primed for the home opener. On Friday night William Mellott, president of the Student Senate, led 2300 students crammed into Memorial Hall through a practice of the cheers, songs and handclaps meant to boost the spirit of the Panther gridders. Both team Captain Tom Holleran and Dr. Walter Riddle of the 1892 team gave rousing speeches.

The Gazette Times reported: "Bulletins on the progress of the Pitt-Lafayette football game at Forbes Field will fill in vacant periods between announcements of the progress of the fourth game of the world's series at New York today....KDKA station announced yesterday." If the series game is rained out, the Pitt game will be "given complete possession of the air waves."

The Athletic Council and University of Pittsburgh published a one hundred and four page 1922 Football Yearbook/Game Program that sold for 25 cents. The cover was illustrated by halfback Mike Hartnett.

For the second consecutive year Jock Sutherland's Lafayette eleven beat the Panthers in a hard fought defensive struggle. The scoreless tie was broken in the third quarter when Pitt halfback Charles Winterburn fumbled on his 34-yard line and Lafayette tackle Leo Pendergast scooped it up and ran unmolested into the end zone. Charlie Berry drop-kicked the extra point and Lafayette held on to win 7 to 0.

Captain and quarterback Tom Holleran broke his wrist and would be out of the lineup until the Penn State game.

Lafayette out gained the Panthers 160 yards to 72 yards and earned seven first downs to the Panthers five.

The Pitt lineup for the game against Lafayette was Lloyd Jordan (left end), Richard Simpson (left tackle), John Clark (left guard), Charles Bowser (center), Jack Sack (right guard), Edmund Fredette (right tackle), Frank Williams (right end), Tom Holleran (quarterback), William Flanagan (left halfback), John Anderson (right halfback) and Nick Colonna (fullback). Substitutes for Pitt appearing in the game were Nick Shuler, Charles Winterburn, Cullen Gourley, Orville Hewitt, Carl Sauer, Milo Gwosden, Karl Bohren, John Clark, Harry Seidelson and Thomas Murdoch. The game was played in 15-minute quarters.

=== West Virginia ===
Week 3: West Virginia at Pitt

Team	1	2	3	4	Total
• West Virginia	0	6	0	3	9
Pitt	0	0	0	6	6

- Date: October 14, 1922
- Location: Forbes Field
  Pittsburgh, PA
- Game start: 3:00 p.m.
- Game attendance: 15,000
- Referee: M. J. Thompson (Georgetown)

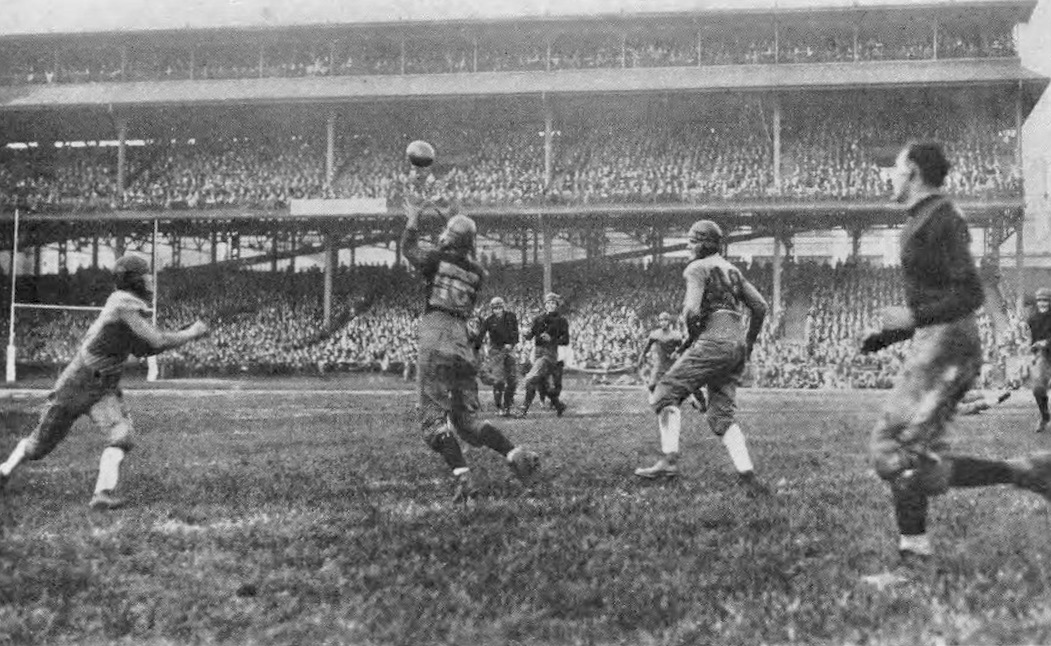
Bowser intercepting a pass vs. West Virginia

Second year coach Clarence "Fats" Spears brought his Mountaineer team to Forbes Field on October 14 to try to break the 19-year drought of a victory over the Pitt Panthers. The Mountaineers won their first two games handily, out scoring the opposition 75–3. The Mountaineer lineup was bolstered by three All-Americans – quarterback Nick Nardacci, tackle Russ Meredith and guard Joe Setron. "The array of timber is in great shape and should be in the best of condition...at game time." "Coach 'Fats' Spears has been priming his men ever since the season opened for the Panther combat."

In coach Warner's weekly article for The Pittsburgh Press he wrote: "The Pitt team is still in the experimental stage...The loss of Capt. Holleran has been a severe blow and has presented a problem which seems very hard to solve....It is likely to take a couple of more hard games before the final lineup is settled upon....Personally, I am fearful of the result and feel that Pitt will be mighty lucky to escape another defeat."

Max E. Hannum of The Pittsburgh Press reported: "The best West Virginia football team in years descended from its mountain fastnesses, gave battle to the Blue and Gold of Pitt yesterday afternoon at Forbes Field, and returned home last night victorious for the first time in 18 years. The final score was 9 to 6." "The Warner machine was shot to pieces a number of times by a series of fumbles just when about to score and the Snakes came through with hardly a mistake."

West Virginia scored in the second quarter. Russ Meredith blocked a Panther punt and Homer Martin scooped it up and raced 30 yards for the touchdown. Joe Setron's try for point was blocked by John Anderson and West Virginia led 6–0 through three quarters. Pitt finally got on the scoreboard early in the fourth quarter. Nick Shuler returned a punt 51 yards to the Mountaineer 4-yard line. "Nick Colonna knifed his way through left tackle for a touchdown." Frank Williams try for placement went low and the score was tied at 6 to 6. West Virginia promptly advanced the ball to the Pitt 3-yard line, but the Panther defense held on downs. Pitt punted out of supposed trouble, but after two failed pass attempts, Armin Mahrt dropped back to the 43-yard line. "A pass, a boot, the ball sailing high. A dull thud behind the goal posts, the upraised arm of the referee, and the world began to know that the Mountaineers had finally come through." The Mountaineers finished the season with a 10–0–1 record.

The Pitt lineup for the game against West Virginia was Lloyd Jordan (left end), Richard Simpson (left tackle), Harry Seidelson (left guard), Charles Bowser (center), Jack Sack (right guard), Thomas Murdoch (right tackle), Milo Gwosden (right end), Nick Shuler (quarterback), Marsh Johnson (left halfback), John Anderson (right halfback) and Orville Hewitt (fullback). Substitutes for Pitt appearing in the game were Nick Colonna, Frank Williams, William Ashbaugh, Cullen Gourley, Karl Bohren, Charles Winterburn, Roy Brubaker, William Flanagan and Carl Sauer. The game was played in 15-minute quarters.

=== At Syracuse ===
Week 4: Pitt at Syracuse

Team	1	2	3	4	Total
• Pitt	7	0	7	7	21
Syracuse	0	7	7	0	14

- Date: October 21, 1922
- Location: Archbold Stadium
  Syracuse, NY
- Game start: 2:30 p.m.
- Game attendance: 25,000
- Referee: P. R. Carpenter (Harvard)

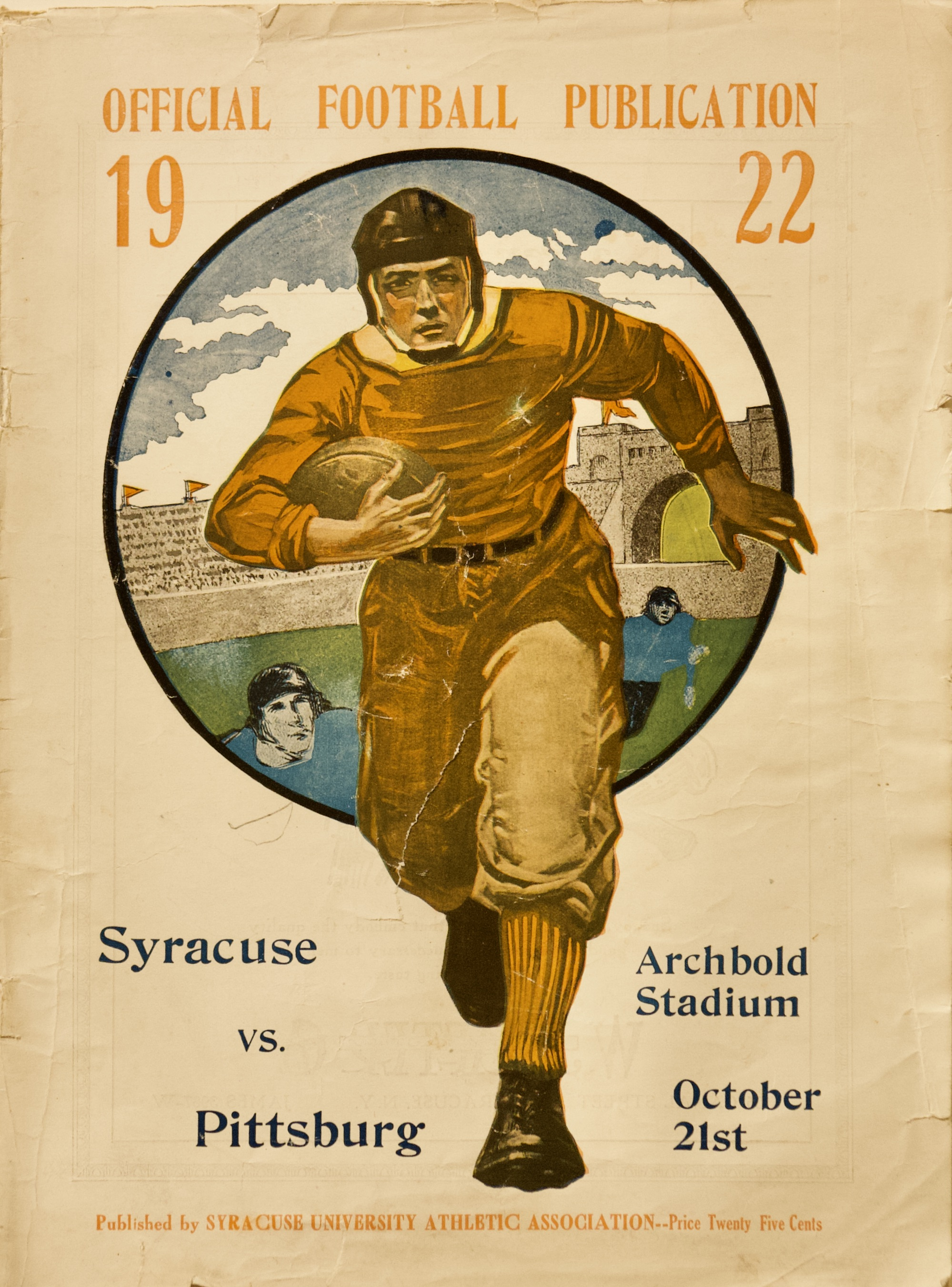
Program for October 21, 1922 Syracuse vs. Pitt game

After losing two games in a row at home, the Panthers rode the train to Syracuse for their fourth game of the season. The Post-Gazette noted: "Syracuse has a veteran combination again this year and the men have been pointed right along for the Panther meeting. Syracuse is more eager to defeat Pitt than any other team it meets." Third year coach Chick Meehan had his Syracuse eleven sitting 3–0–1 on the season. The Orange had out scored their opponents 109–7 and their only hiccup was a 0 to 0 tie with Brown. The Syracuse lineup contained two All-Americans – tackle Pappy Waldorf and center Frank Culver.

"The Panther squad is in good condition, in the main and set for a tough battle." This week Coach Warner was put on bed rest by team doctor Hube Wagner due to a cold which brought on rheumatism. He also had a touch of ptomaine poisoning. This was the first time in 18 years he had missed a practice. He noted to the Pittsburgh Press: "I wish this thing had held off for a few days. I surely wanted to go to Syracuse to see my boys perform against the Meehan crowd. I am still confident that the Panthers are in for a good season, and I wanted to be on hand to watch them."

Regis M. Welsh of The Pittsburgh Sunday Post described the highlight: "Have you ever seen an elephant running amuck and pounding through everything in its path? That's what happened as dusk was putting a finishing touch to the battle here today between the Pitt Panther and the Syracuse Orange. It was Hewitt, the mastodonic fullback of the Panthers who, with the score tied in the fourth period of a game which at times was highly spectacular and again at times mediocre, intercepted a forward pass on the Pitt 30-yard line, ripped, tore and worked himself loose and then outran and took the heart out of four Orange tacklers. Hewitt covered 70 yards...and panting and 'all in,' rested the ball behind the posts for Pittsburgh's first real victory of the season."

Pitt scored early in the first quarter as Syracuse fullback Zimmerman fumbled a punt and Pitt end Frank Williams recovered on the Syracuse 25-yard line. The Pitt offense advanced the ball to the one and Nick Colonna bulled into the end zone for the first touchdown. Frank Williams converted the point after and Pitt led 7 to 0. Syracuse was able to tie the score in the second quarter. On their third penetration inside the Pitt 10-yard line, Syracuse halfback Anderson went over through left guard from four yards out for the touchdown. Halfback McBride kicked the goal after and the score was tied at halftime 7 to 7. Pitt received the second half kick-off and on second down John Anderson fumbled. Syracuse recovered on the Pitt 30-yard line. Nine plays later fullback Kellogg plunged into the end zone for the Syracuse lead. McBride booted the point after and Pitt was behind 14–7. The Pitt offense promptly advanced the ball to the Orange 20-yard line and on second down William Flanagan raced 18 yards around right end for Pitt's second touchdown. Williams was again successful on the point after and the score was tied at the end of three quarters 14 to 14. The last period was a punting duel until Hewitt turned into the defensive hero for Pitt. The losing streak for Pitt was over. Syracuse finished the season with a 6–1–2 record.

The statistics were tilted in Syracuse's favor. Syracuse earned 15 first downs to Pitt's 4. The Orange gained 201 yards rushing to Pitt's 85 and they out gained the Panthers in passing yardage 77 to 65.

The Pitt lineup for the game against Syracuse was Lloyd Jordan (left end), Cullen Gourley (left tackle), John Clark (left guard), John Miller (center), Jack Sack (right guard), Edmund Fredette (right tackle), Frank Williams (right end), Charles Bowser (quarterback), Marsh Johnson (left Halfback), John Anderson (right halfback) and Nick Colonna (fullback). Substitutes appearing in the game for Pitt were Orville Hewitt, William Asbaugh, Richard Simpson, Willialanagan, Harry Seidelson, Nick Shuler, Carl Sauer, and Noble Frank. The game was played in 15-minute quarters.

=== Bucknell ===
Week 5: Bucknell at Pitt

Team	1	2	3	4	Total
Bucknell	0	0	0	0	0
• Pitt	0	0	0	7	7

- Date: October 28, 1922
- Location: Forbes Field
  Pittsburgh, PA
- Game start: 3:00 p.m.
- Game attendance: 10,000
- Referee: A. H. Sharpe (Yale)

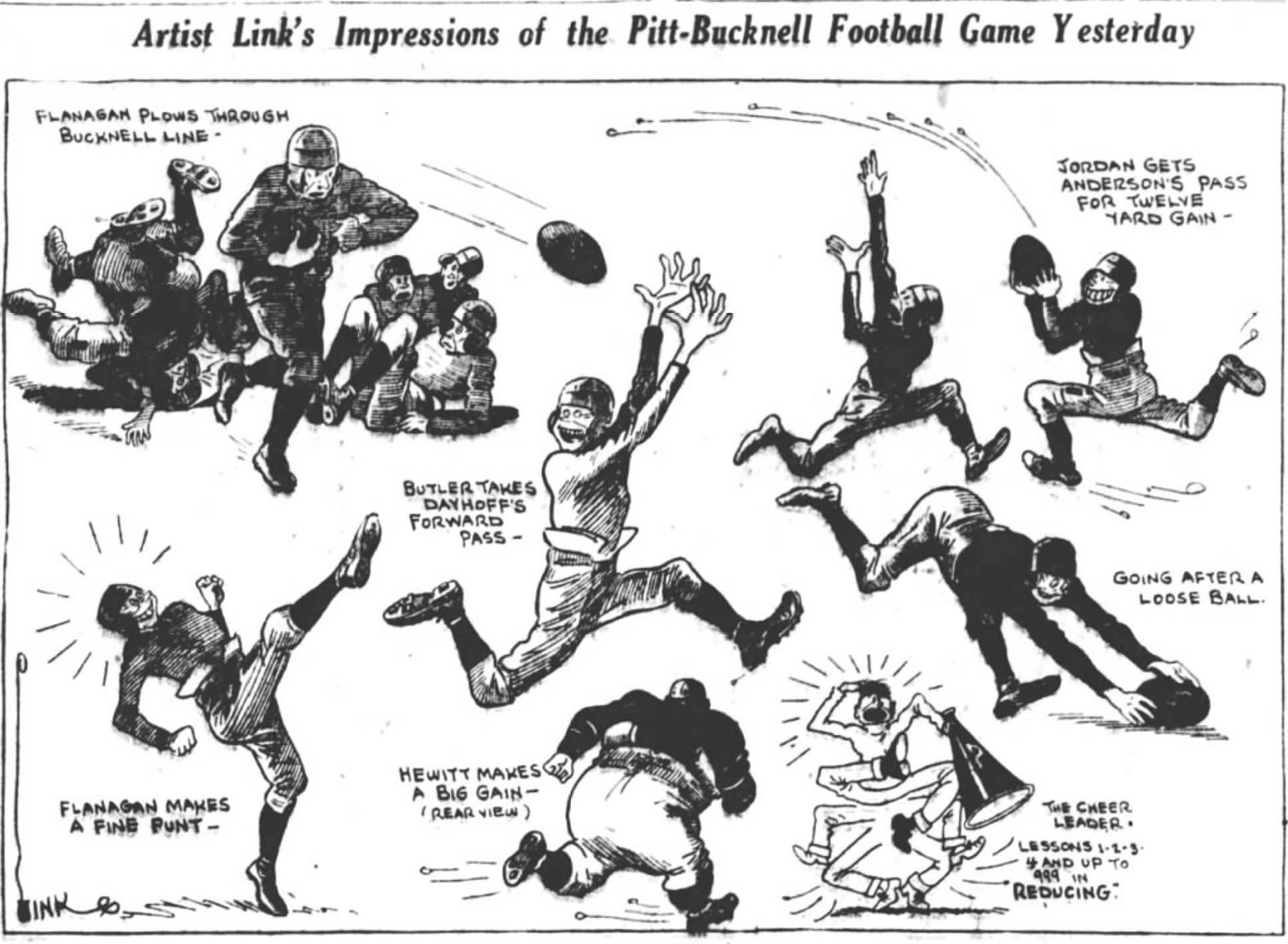
Cartoon describing October 28, 1922 Pitt vs. Bucknell game

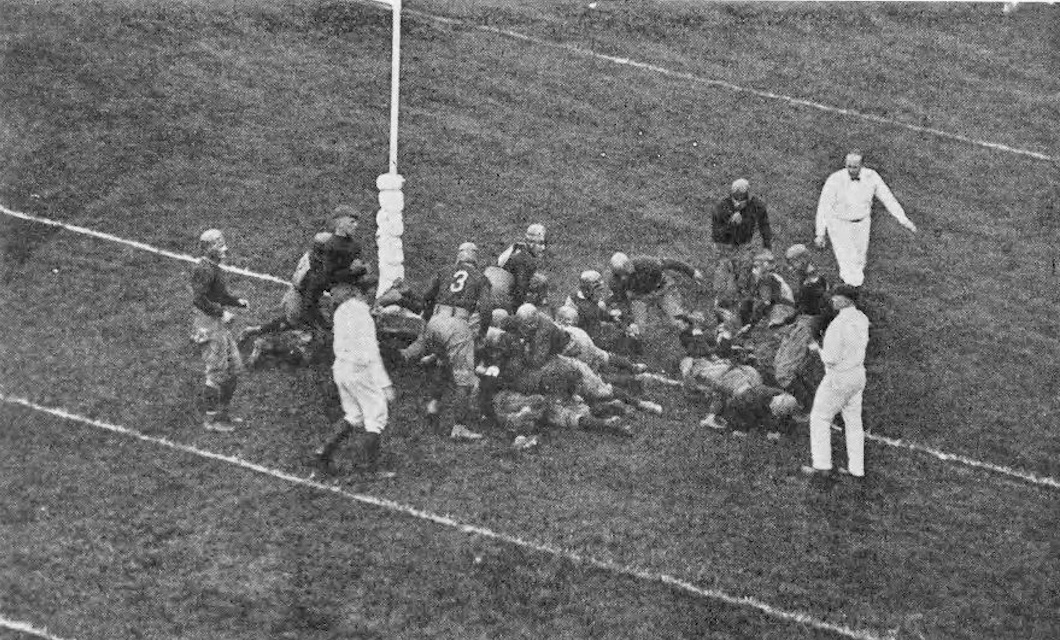
Photo of Nick Colonna scoring winning touchdown vs. Bucknell

For game five, 4th year coach Pete Reynolds and his Bucknell eleven traveled from Lewisburg, PA to Forbes Field to take on the Panthers for the first time since 1913. Bucknell beat Pitt the last two times they played (1912, 1913). Bucknell's 1922 team had a 3–2 record, as they won their first three games handily, but were presently on a two game losing streak.

Bucknell was eager to get back on the winning track and "the visitors report themselves in great shape for the contest this afternoon."

Coach Warner was discharged from the hospital and back at practice on Thursday. He addressed the team: "We have a mighty hard game ahead of us on Saturday boys. You fellows proved on Saturday last what you can do when thoroughly aroused. You will have to be on your toes just as actively if you are to win over Bucknell. Don't take anything for granted, but go at the job as hard as you know right from the start." The Panthers were also fit. They had a new confidence since the win over Syracuse and Coach Warner was back on the sideline.

The Philadelphia Inquirer reported: "With Glenn Warner sitting on the bench in rheumatic pain this afternoon, the Pitt Panthers smashed and ripped the Bucknell line time after time, only to lose the ball either on downs or a punt, when the score was in the making." "The breaks of the game gave Pitt their only touchdown in the closing minutes of play, following three consecutive Bucknell off-side penalties that brought the Panthers within a half-yard of the Bucknell goal. (Nick) Colonna, smashing Pitt fullback, carried the ball over for the sole score of the game...The Bucknell eleven honorably lost to Pitt, score 7–0."

Bucknell had numerous chances to score. In the first quarter the Pitt defense held Bucknell inside the 5-yard line on downs and they later missed three field goals. Pitt missed a field goal early in the second period and later in the quarter lost the ball on downs on the Bucknell 16-yard line. Statistically, Pitt earned 16 first downs to 7 for Bucknell and Pitt out gained the visitors 244 yards to 142. Bucknell finished the season with a 7–4 record.

The Pitt lineup for the game against Bucknell was Lloyd Jordan (left end), Richard Simpson (left tackle), John Clerk (left guard), Charles Bowser (center), Jack Sack (right guard), Edmund Fredette (right tackle), Frank Williams (right end), Nick Shuler (quarterback), William Flanagan (left halfback), John Anderson (right halfback) and Orville Hewitt (fullback). Substitutes appearing in the game for Pitt were Nick Colonna, Cullen Gourley, Carl Sauer and Noble Frank. The game was played in 15-minute quarters.

=== Geneva ===
Week 6: Geneva at Pitt

Team	1	2	3	4	Total
Geneva	0	0	0	0	0
• Pitt	21	7	14	20	62

- Date: November 4, 1922
- Location: Forbes Field
  Pittsburgh, PA
- Game start: 2:30 p.m.
- Referee: James C. Holderness (Lehigh)

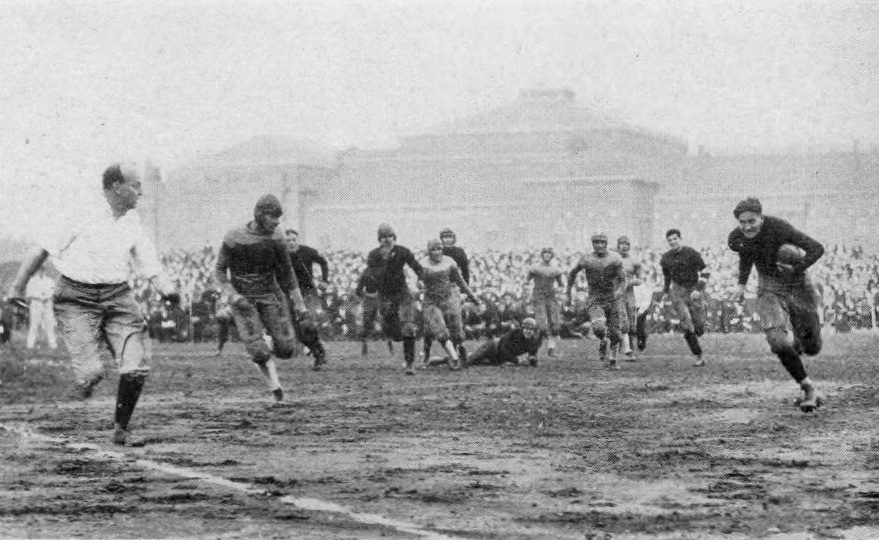
Photo of 1922 Pitt football game action

The 4–2 Geneva Covenanters led by first year coach Robert Park were next on the schedule. Park was the 1921 Carnegie Tech freshman coach. Geneva was 1–1 against Pittsburgh schools so far in the 1922 season having beaten Duquesne and losing to Carnegie Tech. "Geneva has been primed for the game and will come here with its squad in great shape and full of fight."

Historically, when Pitt met Geneva, Coach Warner would rest some regulars for the hard games later on the schedule. He decided to not take any chances with his 1922 contingent and started his strongest team.

Harry Keck of The Gazette Times reported: "The University of Pittsburgh Panthers smothered the plucky football squad of Geneva College of Beaver Falls under a 62–0 score before a mere handful of spectators at Forbes Field yesterday afternoon, giving a surprising exhibition of offensive strength. It has been a long time since a Pitt team has beaten any foe as badly as this and the large score was totally unlooked for."

Pitt scored nine touchdowns. Three in the first quarter and one in the second to make the score 28–0 at halftime. William Flanagan tallied twice with Orville Hewitt and Charles Winterburn each earning one. "Pitt used almost a team of substitutions in the third period, and they had a picnic with the weakened Beaver Falls lads who had put their all into the first half of the game." Marsh Johnson scored three rushing touchdowns in the second half and Flanagan added another. Noble Frank fell on a blocked punt in the end zone for his touchdown. Karl Bohren fumbled going into the end zone and Geneva recovered or the Panthers would have scored 10 touchdowns. The placement kicks were converted by Frank Williams (3), Milo Gwosden (2), Marsh Johnson (2) and John Evans (1). Geneva was able to only garner 2 first downs, while the Panthers amassed 25. On the Geneva offense's only foray into Pitt territory, halfback Wild missed a field goal. The Geneva defense had no answer for the Pitt offense. Geneva finished the season with a 4–6 record.

The Pitt lineup for the game against Geneva was Lloyd Jordan (left end), Richard Simpson (left tackle), John Miller (left guard), Charles Bowser (center), John Clark (right guard), Cullen Gourley (right tackle), Frank Williams (end), Nick Shuler (quarterback), William Flanagan (left halfback), John Anderson (right halfback) and Orville Hewitt (fullback). Substitutes appearing in the game for Pitt were Milo Gwosden, Karl Bohren, Carl Sauer, Marsh Johnson, William Ashbaugh, Ulhard Hangartner, Charles Winterburn, Noble Frank, James Breen, John Evans, Mike Hartnett, Harold Haines, Roy Brubaker, Thomas Murdoch, Cronje Carnahan, Charles Harvey and Kenneth Biddle. The game was played in 15-minute quarters.

=== At Penn ===
Week 7: Pitt at Penn

Team	1	2	3	4	Total
• Pitt	7	0	0	0	7
Penn	0	0	0	6	6

- Date: November 11, 1922
- Location: Franklin Field
  Philadelphia, PA
- Game start: 2:30 p.m.
- Game attendance: 40,000
- Game weather: cold and clear
- Referee: E. J. O'Brien (Tufts)

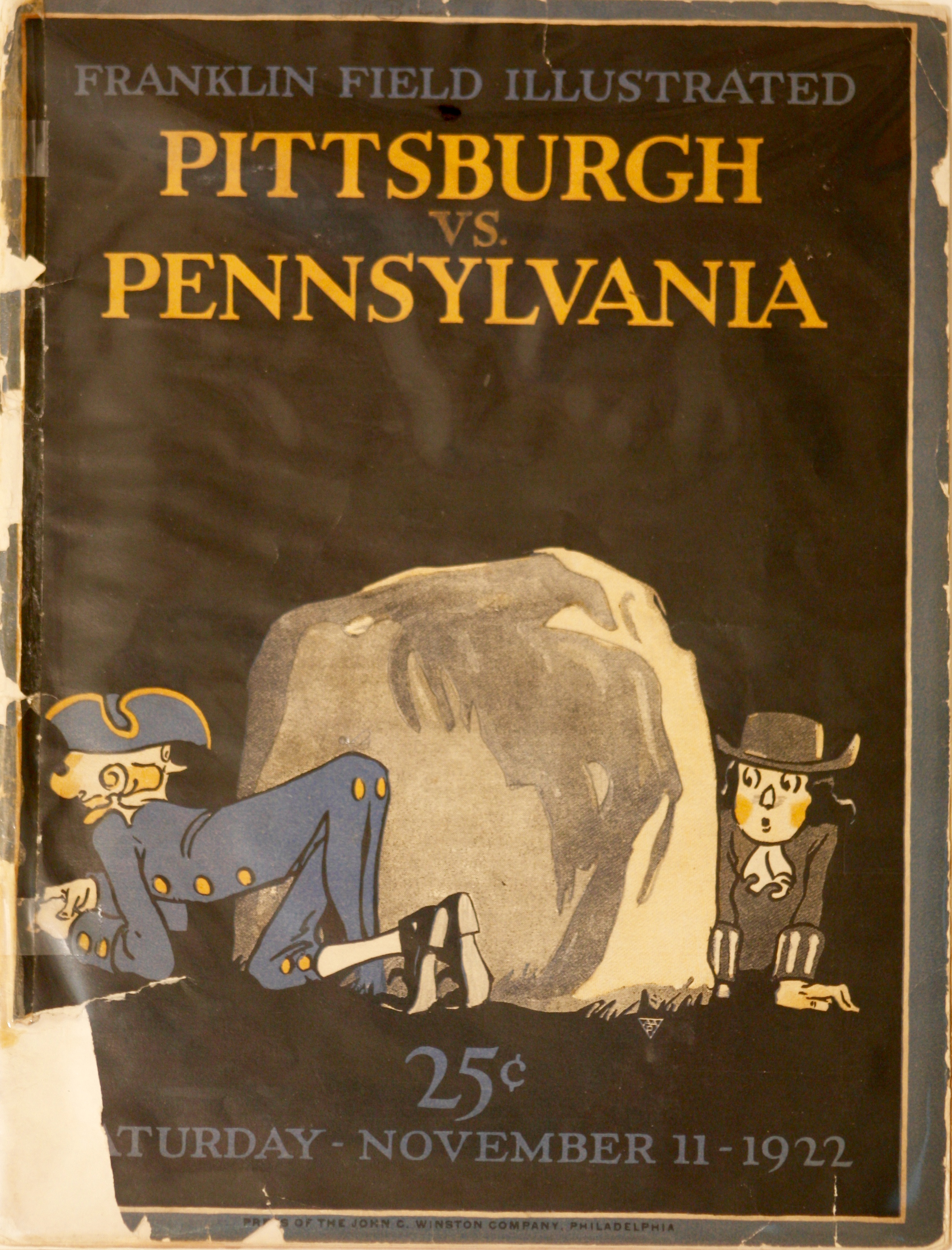
Program for November 11, 1922 Pennsylvania vs. Pitt game

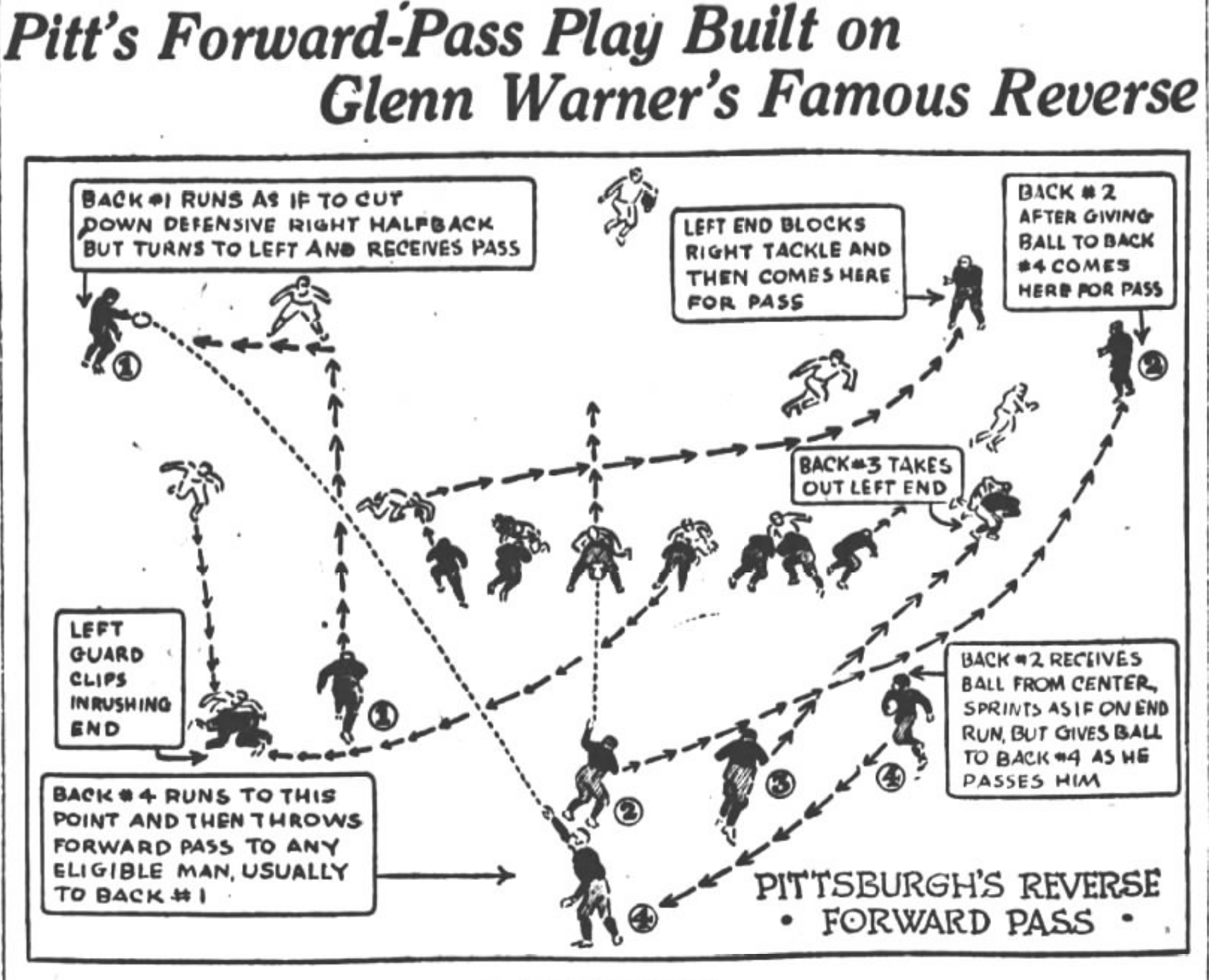
Artist's rendering of Pitt's reverse forward pass

The third road game of the 1922 season was across the state to do battle with third-year coach John Heisman's Penn Quakers on Franklin Field in Philadelphia. "Penn has never beaten Pittsburgh. Seven times the two Keystone State institutions have clashed, but only once has the Red and Blue been able to even hold the Panthers to a draw."

Penn owned a 5–1 record, the only blemish being a 9–7 loss to Alabama the previous Saturday. The Quakers' line was anchored by tackle John Thurman, a 1922 consensus All-American. Starting guard Al Papworth was injured in the Alabama game and was out of the lineup. Otherwise, Penn was ready and their Captain, halfback "Poss" Miller, addressed a pep rally: "We're going to give them h_; we might not win, but they'll know they have been in a battle."

Coach Warner had injury problems of his own. Jack Sack, starting guard, broke his thumb "and the digit is wrapped around with enough bandage to stake the Red Cross through another war." Second string quarterback Nick Shuler did not make the trip so Warner decided to start Charles Winterburn. "Everybody in the Pitt party anticipates a hard game. In short, Penn, anxious to atone for its defeat by Alabama last week, ...has its back to the wall and should be tough to beat."

The Pitt Weekly summarized: "Despite Penn's determination to wipe out all previous Panther defeats, to atone for the Alabama defeat a week ago, and to 'make Pitt join the Navy', Pitt was the possessor of a victorious end of a 7–6 score when the game terminated." The failure of Penn fullback/kicker Ernest "Tex" Hamer, who had not missed all season, to convert the extra point after halfback George Sullivan's spectacular 41 yard scamper for a fourth quarter touchdown was the difference in the game. Pitt tackle Cullen Gourley broke through the line and deflected the kick to save the victory for the Panthers.

"Pittsburgh scored a touchdown seven minutes after the initial kickoff, the gigantic Hewitt crashing through the tally. Williams, tall and lithe Panther, promptly snatched the extra point by driving the ball over the crossbar, straight and true." There was no more scoring until Sullivan's heroics in the fourth period. Pitt missed a field goal near the end of the third period, and the Pitt offense advanced the ball inside the Penn 20-yard line three times but the Penn defense kept them out of the end zone. Pitt gained 223 yards to Penn's 113, and Pitt earned 14 first downs to Penn's 6. Penn finished the season with a 6–3 record.

Coach Glenn Warner, the man of few words, had but little to say before leaving for Pittsburgh. " 'We were lucky to win,' said the dean of coaches. 'Penn has a strong team, brilliant on defense. Sullivan is a spectacular open-field runner. It was a great game'."

The Pitt lineup for the game against Penn was Lloyd Jordan (left end), Richard Simpson (left tackle), John Clark (left guard), Charles Bowser (center), Jack Sack (right guard), Cullen Gourley (right tackle), Frank Williams (right end), Charles Winterburn (quarterback), William Flanagan (left halfback), John Anderson (right halfback) and Orville Hewitt (fullback). Substitutes appearing in the game for Pitt were Milo Gwosden, Carl Sauer, Ulhard Hangartner, Nick Colonna and Karl Bohren. The game was played in 15-minute quarters.

=== Washington & Jefferson ===
Week 8: Washington & Jefferson at Pitt

Team	1	2	3	4	Total
W. & J.	0	0	0	0	0
• Pitt	0	13	6	0	19

- Date: November 18, 1922
- Location: Forbes Field
  Pittsburgh, PA
- Game start: 2:30 p.m.
- Game attendance: 35,000
- Game weather: muddy field
- Referee: Carl A. Reed (Springfield)

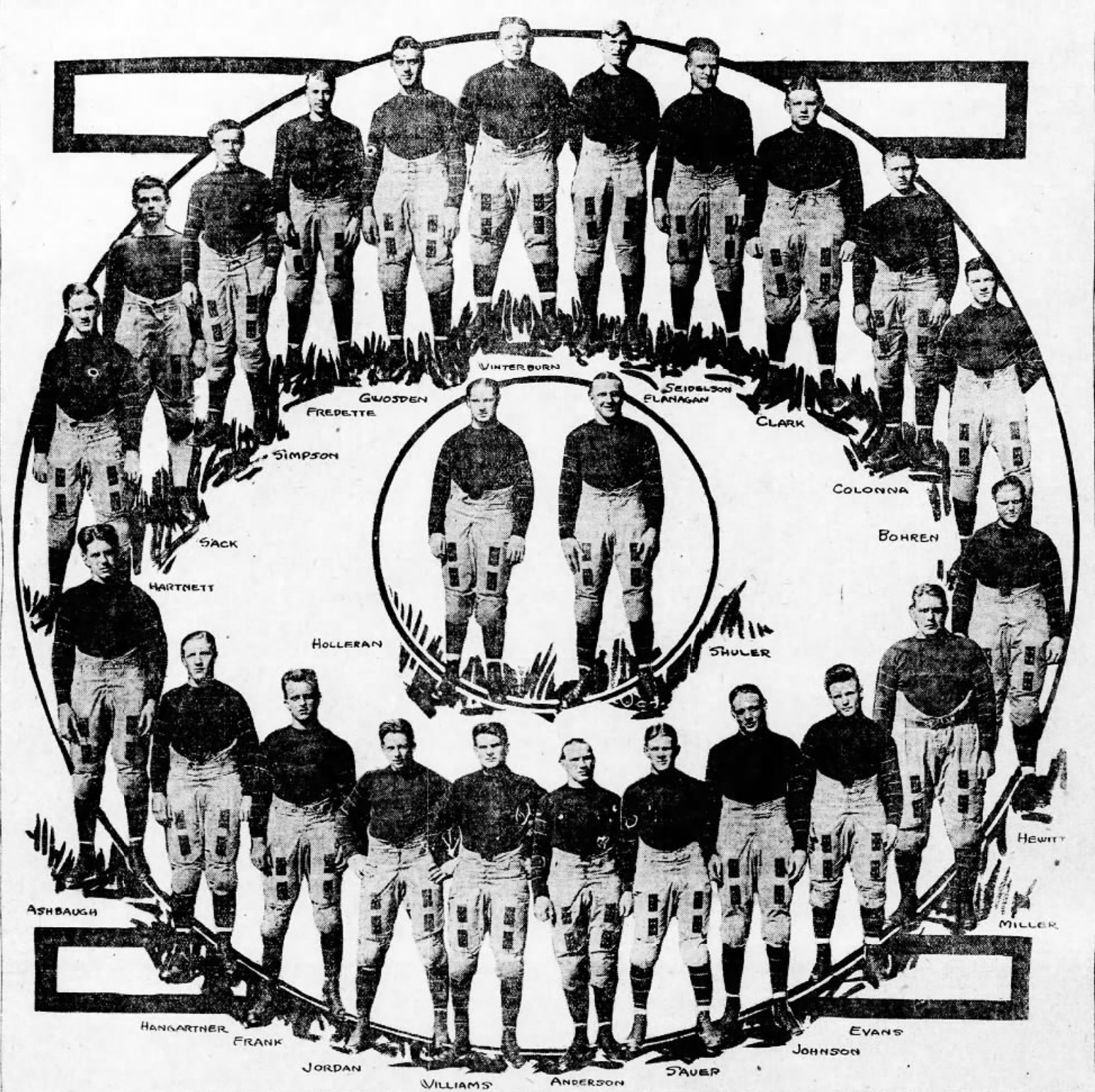
1922 Pitt Football Roster

The "game of the year" against in-state rival Washington & Jefferson College took place on November 18. The ticket demand for this game was a nightmare for the Pitt Graduate Manager. The Pittsburgh Press reported: "Any Pitt students detected scalping will be expelled from the University, a rule to this effect having been adopted by the board of trustees of the university. The students were permitted to purchase only two tickets each, and each signed a statement to the effect that, if called upon, he was willing to make affidavit that the pasteboards were for members of his immediate family." Government and city officials have the police department on alert and anyone seen offering tickets for sale on the streets will be arrested.

Last year's victory over Pitt by W. & J. spurred them on to an undefeated season and invitation to the Rose Bowl, where they tied a strong California Bear team. Second year coach Earl (Greasy) Neale had not lost a game as coach of the Red and Black (16–0–2). The Presidents presently were 6–0–1, a tie with Carnegie Tech their only blemish on the season. Ends Herb Kopf, who caught the touchdown pass in last year's victory, and Lee Spillers plus center Al Crook received All-America mentions.

The Gazette Times spoke with Coach Neale: "The players seem to be right on edge," Neale said, "but it is going to be a mighty hard game. Anyone with a different idea is wrong in my opinion."

Several thousand Pitt students held a pre-victory parade Friday night. They were led by the Pitt band and R.O.T.C. through Oakland and downtown. They carried banners that bore the legends: "White Wash-Jeff", "Pitt Panther Will Make Greasy Kneel" and "The Old Panther Doesn't Wear Any W. & J. Colors."

Coach Warner's injury problems kept mounting. Quarterback Tom Holleran was still nursing his broken wrist. Second string quarterback Nick Shuler was laid up with pneumonia. Second string fullback Nick Colonna dislocated his elbow in the Penn game. Starting halfback William Flanagan contracted a cold and may have bronchitis. Coach Warner warned: "This is not an attempt to alibi in advance, but the actual facts, as I feel it is due to the team to let their supporters know of the handicaps they are working under. Pitt will fight. There is no question about that. While Pitt appears to be outclassed, the Panthers are certainly not overawed by the seeming superiority of the 'wonder team."

Regis M. Welsh of The Pittsburgh Sunday Post wrote: "With a crash that could be heard around the football world, Wash-Jeff, (unbeaten) in 18 consecutive games, unofficial champions of the world and the alleged greatest football team in the elastic boundaries of the east during the last two years, was toppled from its high and mighty place, beaten, routed, and outclassed from start to finish yesterday by the Pitt Panther, at Forbes Field, ground into the mud and muck of the rain-soaked field and forced to admit that Glenn Warner, whom they beat last year, is head and shoulders above all other coaches when it comes to delivering a punch at the crucial moment, priming his team for their greatest test and then galloping away with the ease of a thoroughbred." The final score was 19–0.

The scoreless first quarter ended with Pitt in possession on the W. & J. 4-yard line. The Presidents defense held on the one foot line. The Wash-Jeff offense punted on first down and Pitt had the ball on the W. & J. 26-yard line. A double pass on second down went from Orville Hewitt to William Flanagan to John Anderson on the 14-yard line and he carried it across the goal line for the first touchdown. Frank Williams converted on the point after and Pitt led 7–0. Later in the period Flanagan returned a punt 43 yards to the W. & J. 20-yard line. Three plays later Hewitt went off right tackle for a touchdown from five yards out. Williams missed the point after and Pitt led 13–0. The Presidents offense then advanced the ball with forward passes to the Pitt 7-yard line but the Pitt defense stiffened and took the ball over on downs just before the half ended. The Pitt offense gained three first downs to start the third period and then punted. W. & J. back Erickson fumbled the punt on the 3-yard line and Pitt end Lloyd Jordan picked it up and bowled over Erickson into the end zone for the last touchdown. Williams missed the point and the final read 19–0 in favor of Pitt.

Pitt dominated earning 15 first downs to 4, and gaining 238 rushing yards to 18. Wash-Jeff gained 73 yards through the air to Pitt's 40, but the Pitt defense stiffened and kept the Presidents out of scoring range. Washington & Jefferson finished the season with a 6-3-1 record.

Coach Warner was pleased: "The Panthers showed what they could do when thoroughly aroused. Without Holleran, Shuler or Colonna, and with Flanagan just out of bed, they gave a wonderful exhibition. They certainly deserved to win, and every man on the team is deserving of glory." W. & J. Captain Brenkert was humbled: "We lost, that's all there is to it. Pitt outplayed us. We never expected such a fight. We knew the Panthers were strong, but they were much stronger than we supposed."

The Pitt lineup for the game against Washington & Jefferson was Carl Sauer (left end), Richard Simpson (left tackle), John Clark (left guard), Charles Bowser (center), Jack Sack (right guard), Cullen Gourley (right tackle), Frank Williams (right end), Charles Winterburn (quarterback), William Flanagan (left halfback), John Anderson (right halfback) and Orville Hewitt (fullback). Substitutes appearing in the game for Pitt were Lloyd Jordan, Edmund Fredette, Karl Bohren, Milo Gwosden, Noble Frank, Harry Seidelson, Marsh Johnson, John Evans, Mike Hartnett, William Ashbaugh, Thomas Murdoch, Cronje Carnahan, Ulhard Hangarter, John Miller and Harold Haines. The game was played in 15-minute quarters.

=== Penn State ===
Week 9: Penn State at Pitt

Team	1	2	3	4	Total
Penn State	0	0	0	0	0
• Pitt	0	0	7	7	14

- Date: November 30, 1922
- Location: Forbes Field
  Pittsburgh, PA
- Game start: 2:00 p.m.
- Game weather: fair
- Referee: E. J. O'Brien (Tufts)

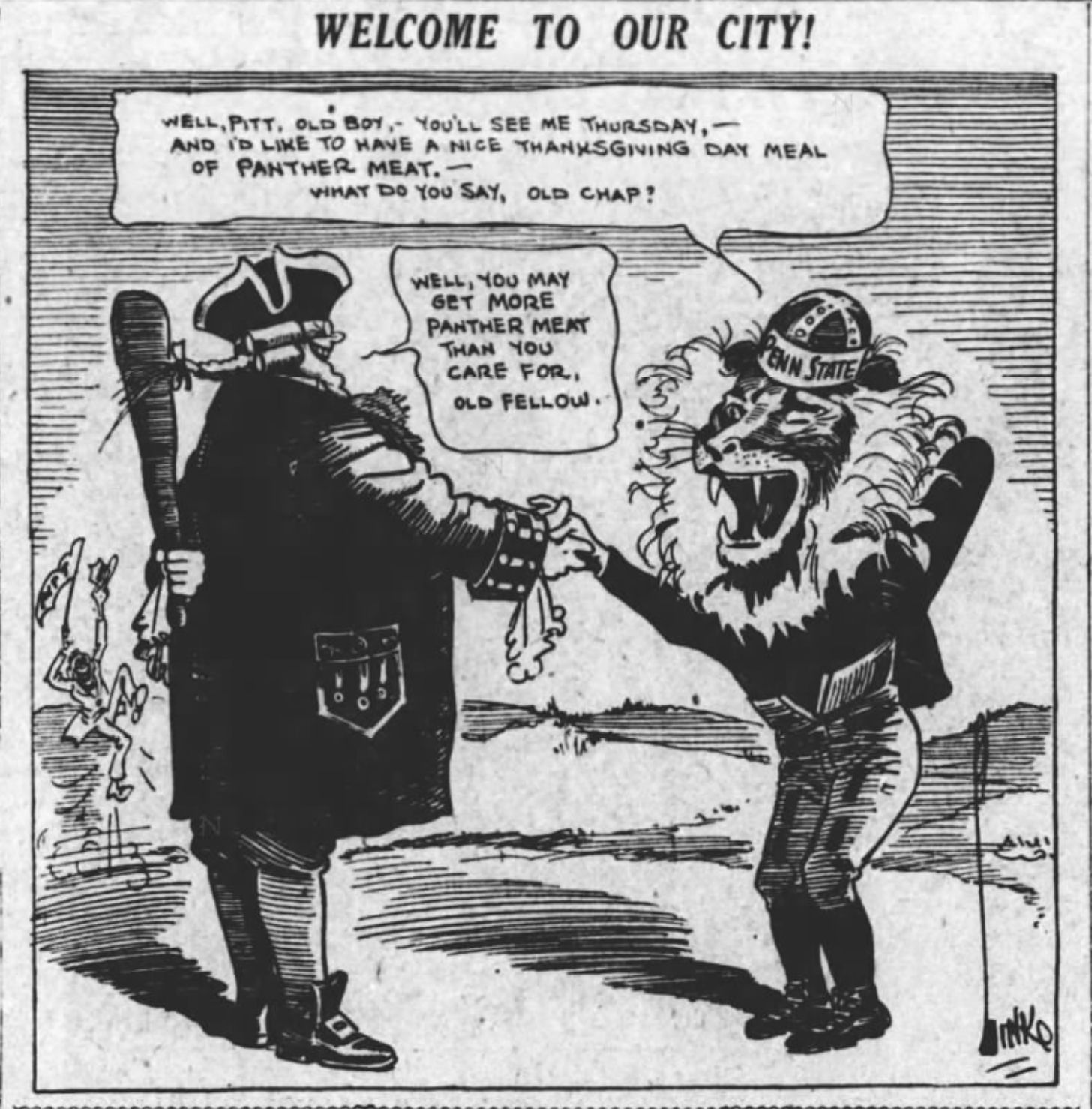
Cartoon previewing the November 30, 1922 Pitt vs. Penn State game

After two straight unbeaten seasons the Penn State eleven led by fifth year coach Hugo Bezdek visited Pittsburgh for the annual Turkey Day clash in 1922 with 6 wins, 2 losses and a tie. Penn State had a strong team with three members of the squad earning All-American honors – guard Joe Bedenk, center Newsh Bentz and halfback Harry Wilson. "Advance reports say that the Bezekians are in perfect fettle, and that, while not boasting about their ability, are grimly determined to come out on top tomorrow, and crown their season a success, in spite of their defeats by Navy and Penn."

The Pitt Weekly pleaded for more student spirit to be shown at the game: "To use the slang expression Pitt students must 'snap out of it'. 'Pop' Warner has whipped the team into shape for tomorrow's fray -- 'Pop' and his warriors have done their part in preparing for The Battle -- now it is up to every student to come out of the trance and help in spirit to Beat Penn State."

Pitt won 14–0, finally scoring against Penn State for the first time since 1918. Similarly, Penn State has now not scored against Pitt for three years.

Pitt and State continued their scoreless duel through the first half. Orville Hewitt fumbled on the Pitt 30-yard line early in the first period and State fullback Barney Wentz recovered. The Pitt defense held and State quarterback Mike Palm missed a drop kick from the 35-yard line. In the second quarter, Palm returned a William Flanagan punt 41 yards to the Pitt 36-yard line. The Pitt defense held again and Palm was short on his 43 yard field goal attempt.

The second half was all Pitt. The Panthers marched 64 yards earning five first downs to the State 8-yard line and lost the ball on downs. State punted out of danger on first down, but Flanagan returned the punt 44 yards to the State 6-yard line. Hewitt bulled into the center of the line on both first and second down to place the ball on the one yard line. "With the State defense drawn up tight against the center of the line, Flanagan dashed off right end, collided head on with the goal post and fell over the goal line, to the accompaniment of the wild cheers of the Pitt rooters and the 'Hail, Hail the Gang's All Here!' of the prancing Pitt band." Flanagan shook off the effects of his run-in with the goal post and Frank Williams kicked the goal after. Pitt led 7 to 0.

Pitt had possession on its 34-yard line at the beginning of the fourth quarter. The Pitt offense advanced the ball steadily to the State 15-yard line. A forward pass from Flanagan to John Anderson "as the latter was crossing the line gave Pitt the second and last touchdown." Williams was good on the point after and Pitt won 14–0. Penn State finished the season with a 6–4–1 record. (Ironically, Penn State with their mediocre 6–3–1 record went on to play in the Rose Bowl! The Rose Bowl committee wanted Penn State and agreed three months before the 1922 season to invite the Lions. The Nittanies lost to USC 14–3.)

The Panthers deserved to win - Pitt gained 256 total yards to 65 for the Lions; Pitt earned 13 first downs to 3 for State; Pitt completed one forward pass (for a touchdown) of 7 attempts and State completed 5 of 10 for 27 yards.

The Pittsburgh Press reported that Coach Warner said: "I may have worked with better football players, but I never toiled with better fellows, and I never got any better co-operation out of a squad. The Panthers were all for the team, with no one man thinking more of himself than of his mates."

The Pitt lineup for the game against Penn State was Carl Sauer (left end), Richard Simpson (left tackle), John Clark (left guard), Charles Bowser (center), Jack Sack (right guard), Cullen Gourley (right tackle), Frank Williams (right end), Charles Winterburn (quarterback), William Flanagan (left halfback), John Anderson (right halfback) and Orville Hewitt (fullback). Substitutes appearing in the game for Pitt were William Ashbaugh, Harry Seidelson, Lloyd Jordan, Nick Colonna, Noble Frank, John Miller, Marsh Johnson and Tom Holleran. The game was played in 15-minute quarters.

=== At Stanford ===
Week 10: Pitt at Stanford

Team	1	2	3	4	Total
• Pitt	0	10	0	6	16
Stanford	0	0	0	7	7

- Date: December 30, 1922
- Location: Stanford Stadium
  Palo Alto, CA
- Game start: 2:30 p.m.
- Game attendance: 6,000
- Game weather: rainy and cold
- Referee: George M. Varnell (Chicago)

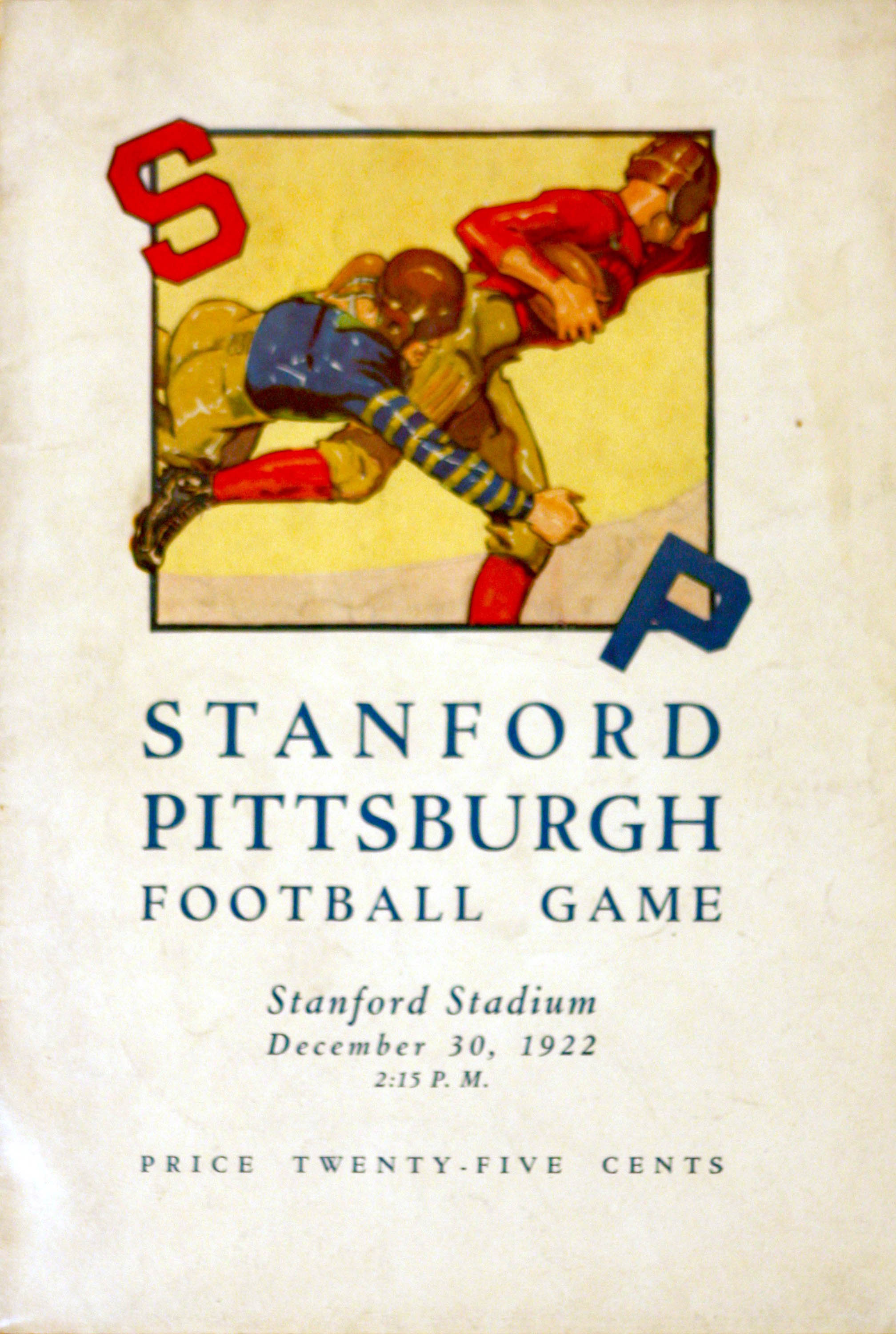
Program for December 30, 1922 Stanford vs. Pitt game

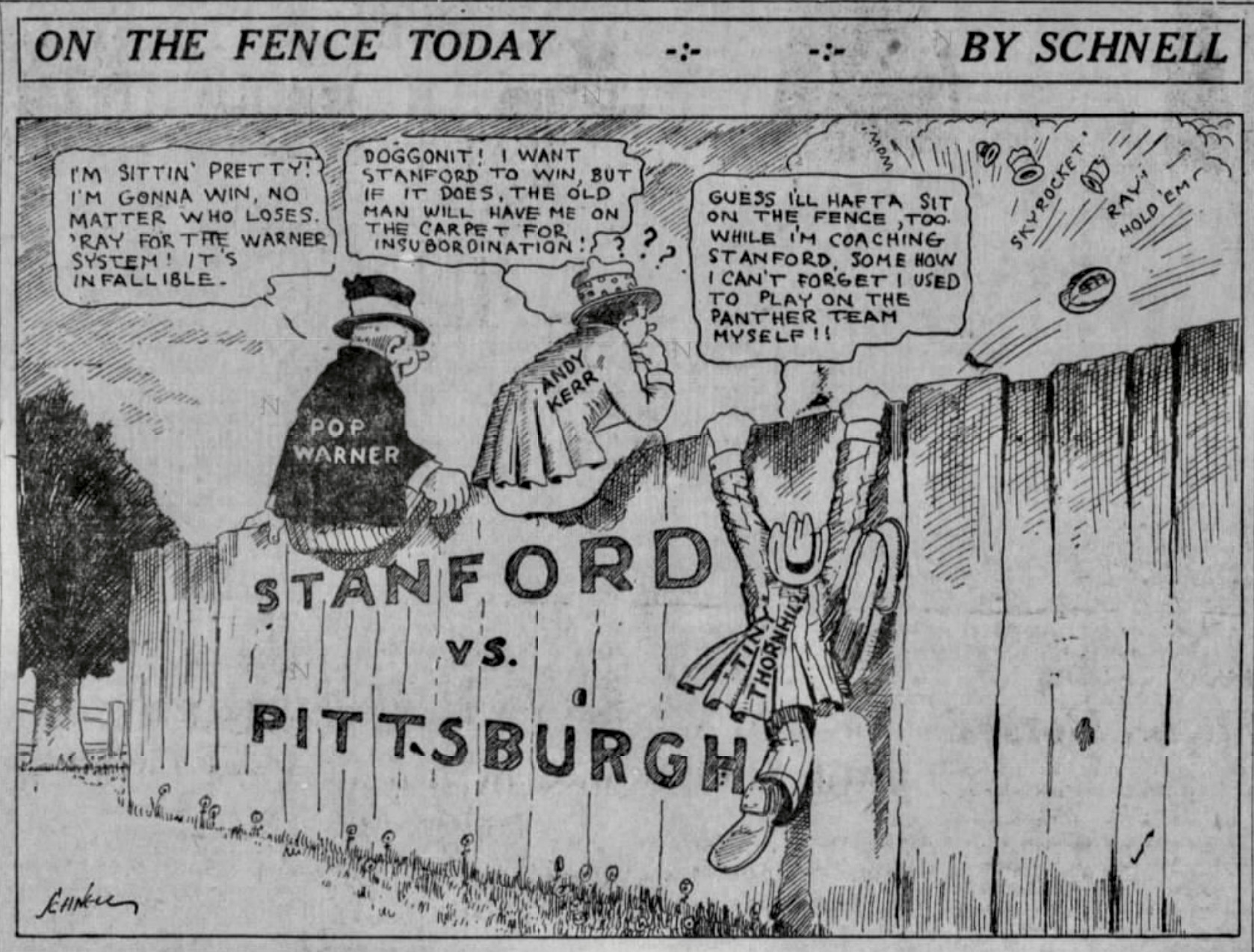
Cartoon previewing the December 30, 1922 Stanford vs. Pitt game

The final road game of the season was a holiday trip to the west coast to play Coach Warner's other team – Stanford. "Coach Warner saw the trip as an opportunity to assess progress being made by assistants (Andrew) Kerr and (Claude 'Tiny') Thornhill, and evaluate the talent of the Stanford players in game conditions."

Prior to preparing for the Stanford tussle, the coach spent a week in the hospital having his tonsils removed.

Stanford had a 4–4 record, but their showing against California in their last game enhanced their status and generated interest in the intersectional battle with Pitt.

The Panthers embarked on their 6,000 mile round trip on December 21 at 9 p.m. The next morning they were in Chicago and were feted by the Windy City Pitt alumni with breakfast at the Hotel LaSalle, while the train cars were attached to the Chicago, Milwaukee, & St. Paul Transcontinental Limited. The train departed at 11:25 a.m. and four hours later in Savanna, IL, the team got off the train and had a short workout. The next day the first workout stop was in North Platte, NE, home of the original Buffalo Bill Ranch. They stopped later for a workout in Cheyenne, WY and followed that with a 6:00 a. m. workout in Ogden, UT on Christmas eve day, prior to crossing the Great Salt Lake. "A 10-minute stop was made at Montello, Nev., where coach Warner again ordered the boys out for a gallop." The train departed Reno, NV at 8 p.m. and was to arrive in Oakland at 8 a. m. but arrived an hour late. The welcoming committee did not mind and the Panthers were treated to a special day in San Francisco. A swim and lunch at the Olympic Club was followed by a sightseeing tour. The day was capped off with a turkey dinner at the Fairmont Hotel and a show. The next morning, the team was off to Palo Alto and three days of practice before the game.

Jack James of The San Francisco Examiner had an interesting take on the game: "The Pittsburgh-Stanford football game tomorrow brings about a most peculiar situation. Here is Glenn Warner, active coach of one team, and head advisory guardian angel of the other. His right hand is meeting his left hand when Pittsburgh and Stanford take the field. In short, it's the only known case of 'heads I win, tails you lose' in intercollegiate football, and as such, unique."

Coach Warner was worried: "I am a little worried over the outcome of tomorrow's game. Our trip across the continent hasn't done us any good, and Pittsburgh probably won't play as good a game as we did against Penn State. Andy's boys will probably play the best game of the year." Andy Kerr countered: "We're going to play that crowd off its feet tomorrow.... I believe Stanford will play its best game tomorrow. All the boys are in good condition."

After the game Jack James of The Examiner posted: "The University of Pittsburgh football eleven, which is coached directly by Mr. Warner, defeated the Stanford varsity eleven, which is indirectly supervised by Mr. Warner, here today buy a score of 16 to 7. It was a sweeping triumph for Warner coaching methods."

At the end of the scoreless first quarter Pitt had possession of the ball on Stanford's 3-yard line. Orville Hewitt bulled into the end zone on the first play after the intermission. Frank Williams kicked the placement goal and Pitt led 7 to 0. Stanford received the kick-off and on second down halfback Cleaveland fumbled and John Clark recovered for the Panthers on the Stanford 8-yard line. The Panthers had to settle for a Williams 20 yard field goal to make the score 10 to 0 at halftime. The third period was scoreless. Pitt's final score came on a 31 yard scoring pass from John Anderson to William Flanagan early in the fourth quarter. Williams was unsuccessful on the point after and Pitt led 16 to 0. The Stanford offense opened up a strong passing attack and managed to advance the ball to the Pitt 1-yard line. "Dennis smashed over for the touchdown and Cuddleback kicked goal." Final score 16 to 7.

The Pitt lineup for the game against Stanford was Carl Sauer (left end), Richard Simpson (left tackle), John Clark (left guard), Charles Bowser (center), Jack Sack (right guard), Cullen Gourley (right tackle), Frank Williams (right end), Charles Winterburn (quarterback), William Flanagan (left halfback), John Anderson (right halfback) and Orville Hewitt (fullback). Substitutes appearing in the game for Pitt were Nick Shuler, Noble Frank, Nick Colonna, William Ashbaugh, Tom Holleran, John Miller, Harry Seidelson and Thomas Murdoch. The game was played in 15-minute quarters.

On December 31, the Panthers traveled to Los Angeles for the Rose Bowl festivities. On New Year's Day they had a full schedule. The first event was the Tournament of Roses Parade followed by the football game in the afternoon. In the evening they were guests at the Annual Tournament Ball where they had the pleasure of meeting Jack Dempsey.

At noon on January 2, the Panther contingent headed east and the next day the team explored the Grand Canyon. The last high point of the trip was a five hour layover in St. Louis with sightseeing and shopping the main pursuits. The team then reboarded the train for the last leg of the trip and they arrived home on Sunday January 7.

== Scoring summary ==
1922 Pittsburgh Panthers scoring summary
Player	Touchdowns	Extra points	Field goals	Safety	Points
William Flanagan	6	0	0	0	36
Orville Hewitt	6	0	0	0	36
John Anderson	4	0	0	0	24
Marsh Johnson	3	2	0	0	20
Nicolas Colonna	3	0	0	0	18
Frank Williams	0	13	1	0	16
Carl Sauer	2	0	0	0	12
J. Charles Winterburn	1	0	0	0	6
Lloyd Jordan	1	0	0	0	6
Noble Frank	1	0	0	0	6
Karl Bohren	1	0	0	0	6
Milo Gwosden	0	2	0	0	2
John Evans	0	1	0	0	1
Totals	28	18	1	0	189

== Postseason ==
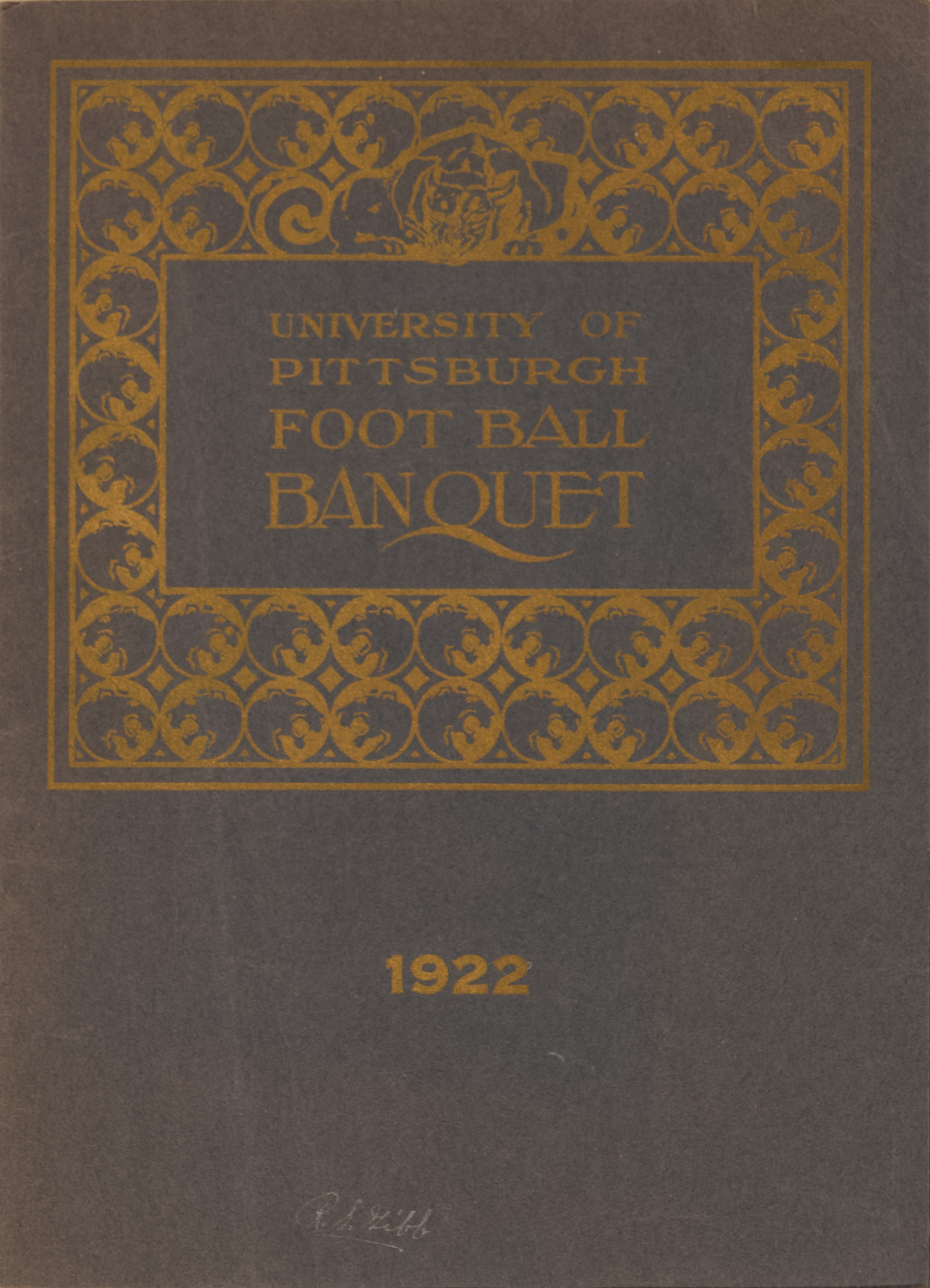
1922 annual football banquet program

In spite of a coach with two allegiances and two early season losses, the 1922 edition of the Panthers ended on a positive note with an 8-2 record and a third place tie with Penn and Syracuse in the New York Times ranking of Eastern teams.

At the football banquet, the following players received their letters: Thomas Holleran (Captain), John C. Anderson, William D. Ashbaugh, Karl Bohren, Charles W. Bowser, George I. Carson (Manager), John W. Clark, Nicholas C. Colonna, William H. Flanagan, Noble L. Frank, H.Edmund Fredette, W. Cullen Gourley, Milo Gwosden, Orville M. Hewitt, Marsh Johnson, Lloyd P. Jordan, John E. Miller, Thomas R. Murdoch, Jacob B. Sack, Carl H. Sauer, Harry Seidelson, Nicholas Shuler, Richard M. Simpson, Frank Williams and J. Charles Winterburn. Of these gentlemen Tom Holleran, John Anderson, Orville Hewitt, Frank Williams, Richard Simpson, John Clark and John Miller have played their last game for the Panthers.

Charles Bowser was elected captain by his teammates for the 1923 football season.

Reginald French Boulton, a student in the School of Economics, was named student manager for the 1923 football team.

On January 18, the University of Pittsburgh Athletic Council approved a three year contract with John Bain (Jock) Sutherland to replace Glenn S. Warner as head football coach. Dr. Sutherland was also a member of the dental faculty. "With Sutherland as head coach of football, Pitt can now boast of having three varsity coaches that are Pitt graduates, Coach (H. Clifford)Carlson of the basketball team and Coach (Frank) Shea of the track team being the other two."

=== All-American selections ===
Charles Bowser – center (2nd team Walter Camp; All-Eastern and National Honor Roll by Billy Evans; 1st team Tom Thorpe, NYU coach; 2nd team Romelke Press Clipping Bureau Consensus; 1st team Walter Eckersall; 2nd team Lawrence Perry.)

Jack Sack – guard (Honorable mention Walter Camp; All-Eastern and National Honor Roll by Billy Evans; 1st team Tom Thorpe, NYU coach; 4th team Romelke Press Clipping Bureau Consensus.)

Orville Hewitt – fullback (Honorable mention Walter Camp; 4th team Romelke Press Clipping Consensus.)

William Flanagan – halfback (Honorable mention Walter Camp.)
