= Lillian Mayfield Wright =

American poet

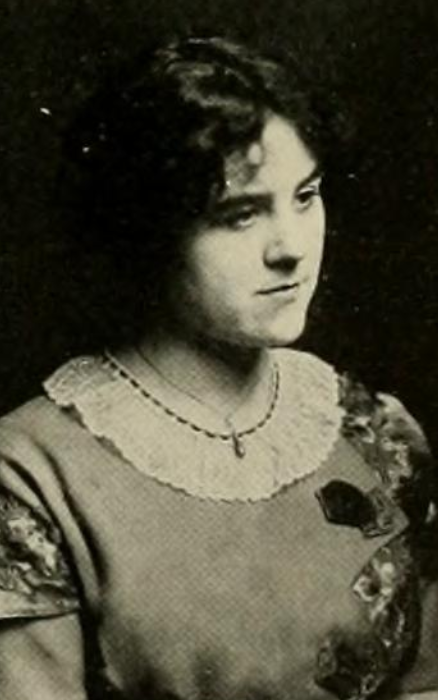
- Lillian Mayfield, from the 1915 yearbook of West Virginia Wesleyan College
- Born: October 24, 1894; Conaway, West Virginia
- Died: February 26, 1986 (aged 91); Chapel Hill, North Carolina
- Other name: Lillian Mayfield Roberts
- Occupation: Poet

Lillian Perry Mayfield Roberts Wright (October 24, 1894 – February 26, 1986) was an American poet.

== Early life and education ==
Lillian Perry Mayfield was born in Conaway, West Virginia, the daughter of Joshua Grant Mayfield and Florence May Carter Mayfield. She attended West Virginia Wesleyan College and New York University, and studied with poet Joyce Kilmer.

== Publications ==
Many of her poems and stories were published in national magazines under the name Lillian Mayfield Roberts. "The best of these mountain poets is Lillian Mayfield Roberts," commented H. L. Mencken in The American Mercury in 1926. One of her poems, "Hill Hunger", was included in the anthology Modern American Lyrics (1924). Her short story "The Fly on the Window" won $1000 from the West Virginia Review.

- "The Prayer" (1918)
- "Clarksburg Season Opens" (1919)
- "The Professor's Wife" (1921)
- "Skies are so High" (1921)
- "Tomorrow" (1921)
- "Requiem for Dead Hopes" (1921)
- "Retrospect" (1922)
- "If (for the Wife)" (1922)
- "In the Market" (1923)
- "Home" (1925)
- "Zinnias" (1927)
- "Mountain Medicine" (1964)

== Personal life and legacy ==
Lillian Mayfield married twice. Her first husband was George Paul Roberts; they married in 1916, and divorced in 1928. Her second husband, John J. Wright, was a public health professor at the University of North Carolina; they married in 1930. She died in Chapel Hill, North Carolina in 1986, aged 91 years. West Virginia University holds a collection of Wright's notebooks, including the manuscript of an unpublished novel at the West Virginia & Regional History Center.
