= West Virginia Wesleyan College =

Methodist college in Buckhannon, West Virginia, US

- Latin: Wesleyanum Collegium Virginiae Occidentalis
- Former name: Wesleyan University of West Virginia (1905–1906)
- Type: Private college
- Established: 1890; 136 years ago
- Accreditation: HLC
- Religious affiliation: United Methodist Church
- Academic affiliations: CIC; NAICU; IAMSCU
- Endowment: $88 million
- President: James Moore
- Faculty: 137
- Students: 1,055
- Undergraduates: 971
- Postgraduates: 84
- Location: Buckhannon, West Virginia, United States; 38°59′19″N 80°13′18″W
- Campus: Rural
- Colors: Orange and black
- Nickname: Bobcats and Lady Bobcats
- Sporting affiliations: NCAA Division II - MEC
- Mascot: Bobcat
- Website: wvwc.edu
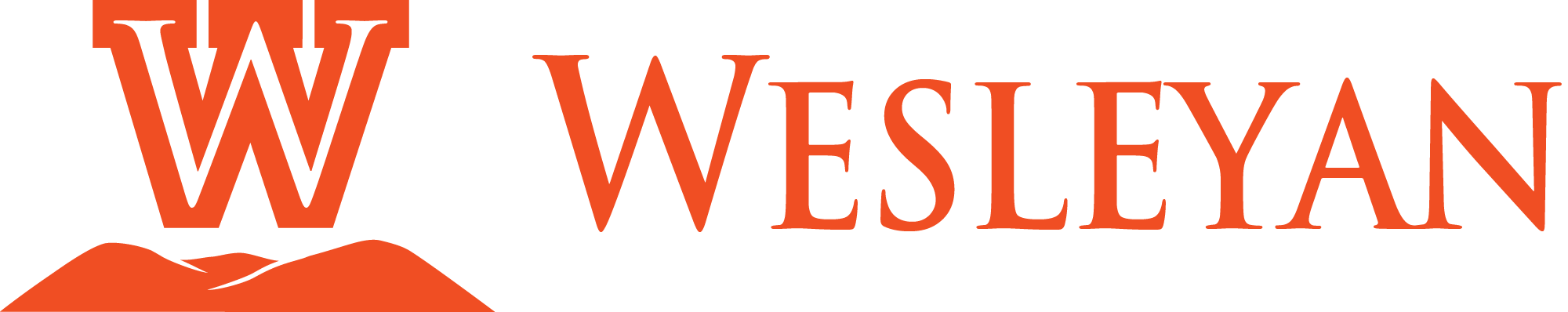

West Virginia Wesleyan College is a private college in Buckhannon, West Virginia, United States. It has an enrollment of about 1,055 students from 35 U.S. states and 26 countries. The school was founded in 1890 by the West Virginia Conference of the Methodist Episcopal Church and is currently affiliated with the United Methodist Church. West Virginia Wesleyan College is accredited by the Higher Learning Commission.

== History ==
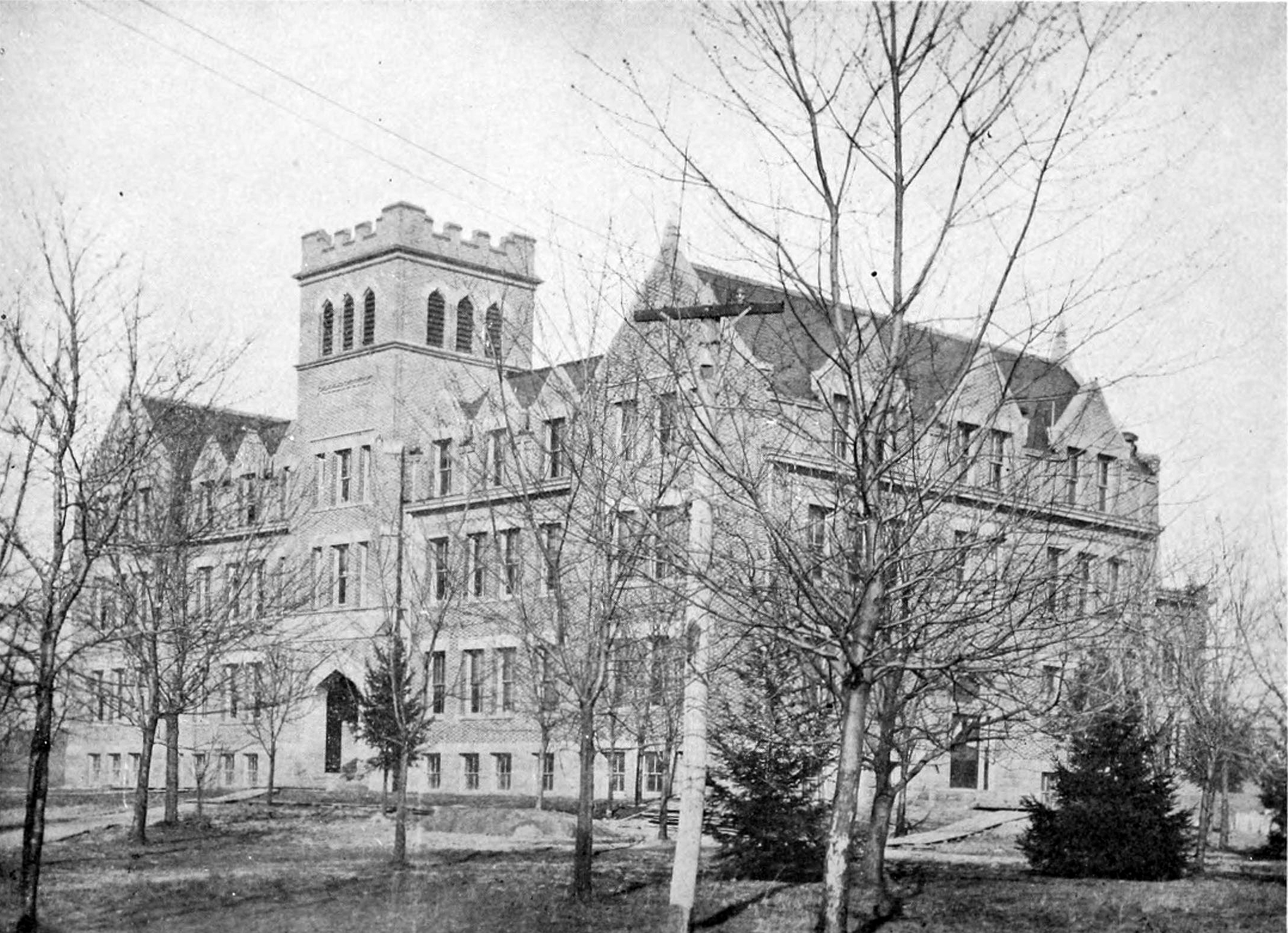
Main Hall, 1908

=== Early history ===
West Virginia Wesleyan College was founded in 1890 by the West Virginia Annual Conference of the Methodist Episcopal Church. The school opened in 1890, in a new three-story brick building where the current Lynch-Raine Administration Building now stands. Ohio Wesleyan University and Boston University School of Theology alumnus Bennett W. Hutchinson was the college's first president.

Following ten years focusing on college preparatory work, college-level instruction was first offered in 1900 culminating in the first baccalaureate degrees in 1905. For one year the institution was named Wesleyan University of West Virginia but it was quickly changed to West Virginia Wesleyan College in honor of John Wesley, the founder of Methodism. Pre-college instruction continued until 1923 when it was discontinued because the high schools in the state had grown enough to adequately perform that task.

=== Recent years ===
Pamela Jubin Balch, a 1971 graduate of Wesleyan, became the college's 18th president in July 2006. Dr. Balch is the first woman to serve as president in the college's history. At the outset of her tenure as president, Balch reinstated the college's briefly-discontinued nursing program as well as its 3-2 engineering program. The college has since expanded its academic programs, adding graduate degrees in athletic training, business administration, English Writing, and nursing.

== Academics ==
The college offers over 50 undergraduate majors and 33 minors. Wesleyan also has 3-2 engineering partnerships with Marshall University and West Virginia University. Undergraduate degrees are awarded in Bachelor of Arts, Bachelor of Science, Bachelor of Science in Nursing, and Bachelor of Music Education. Graduate degrees awarded include the Master of Science in Athletic Training, Master of Business Administration, Master of Fine Arts in Creative Writing, Master of Science in Nursing and Master of Clinical Mental Health Counseling

Approximately 80% of West Virginia Wesleyan's faculty have earned doctorates or comparable terminal degrees within their field. The student-faculty ratio is 11.6 to 1, with an average class size of 15.

== Campus ==
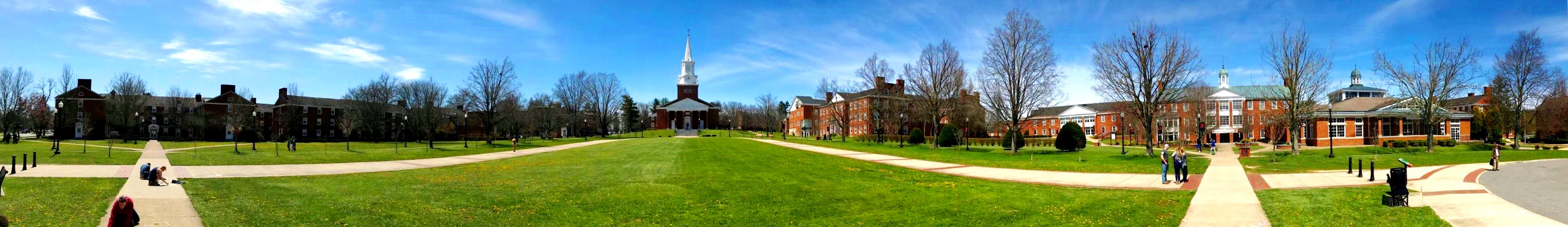
West Virginia Wesleyan College

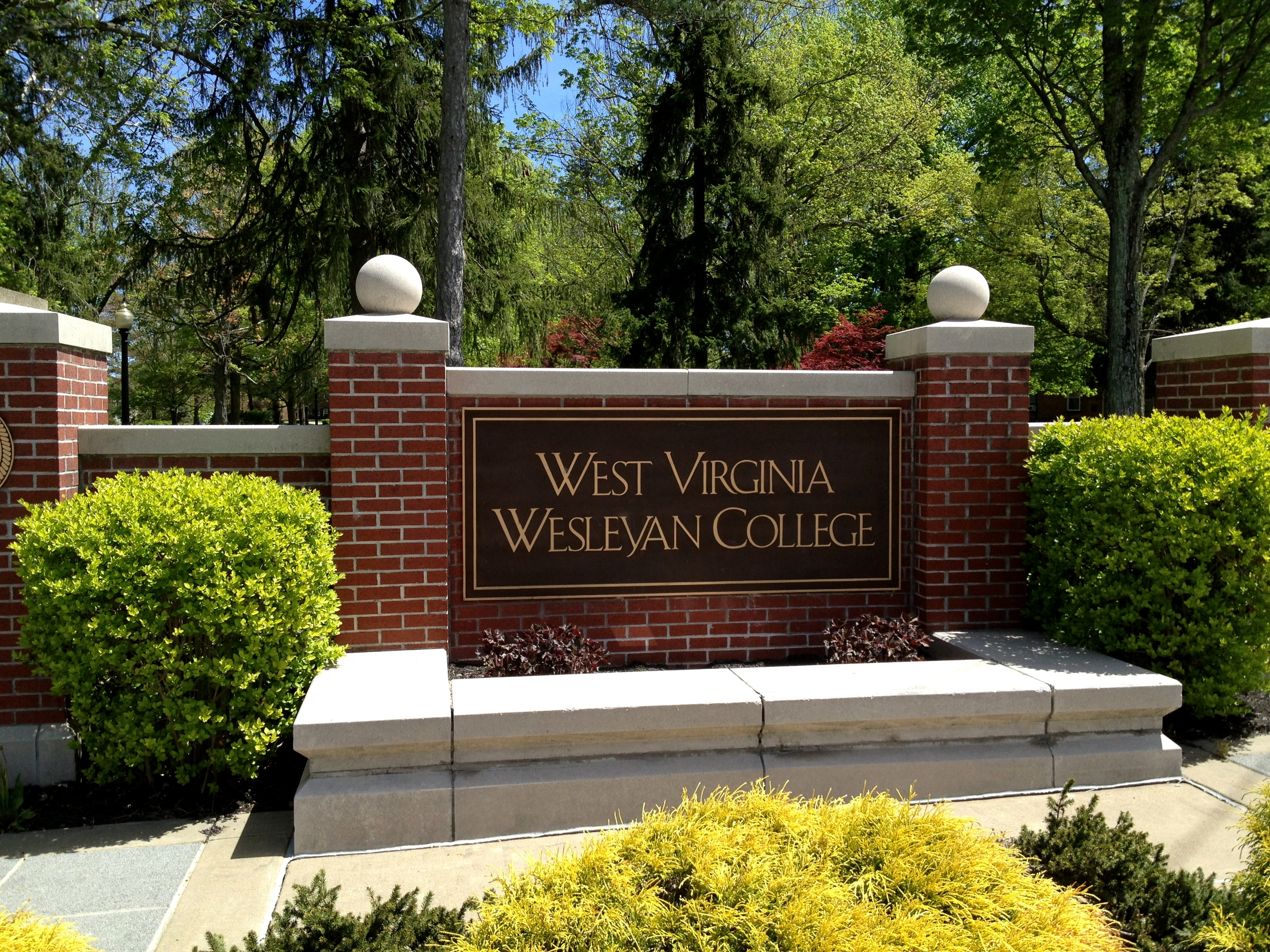
West Virginia Wesleyan College welcome sign on the corner of College Avenue and Meade Street

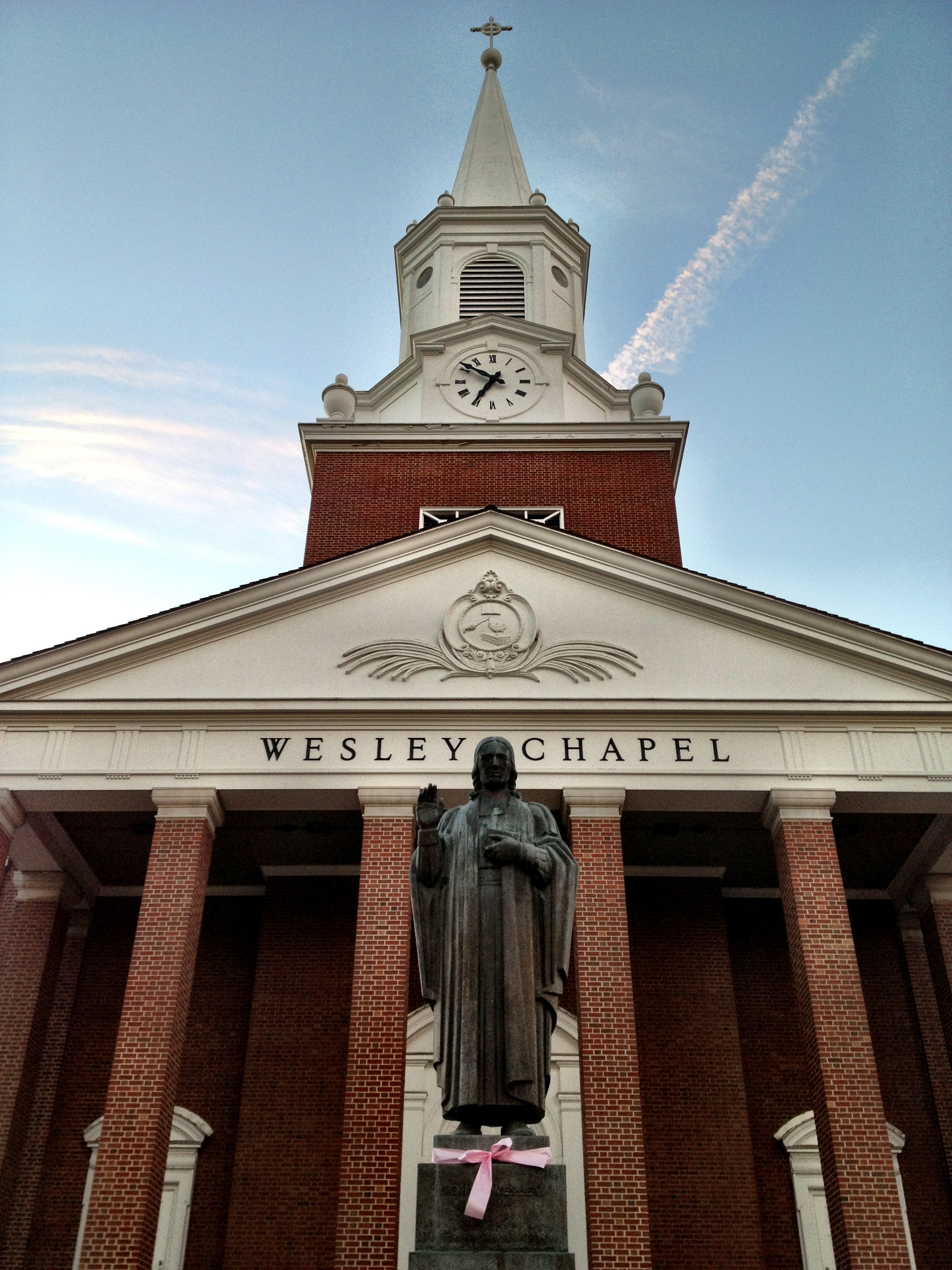
Statue of John Wesley in front of Wesley Chapel at WV Wesleyan College

The campus boasts 23 major buildings of Georgian architecture. The grounds are situated in a park-like setting of more than 100 acres.

== Student life ==
Wesleyan has retained its residential character; about 90% of the students live on campus.

There are 21 NCAA Division II sports teams, and 70 clubs and organizations.

The Greek system was initiated on campus in 1925, and many fraternities and sororities have been founded since.

Some Wesleyan students participate in community service through the Center for Community Engagement and Leadership Development (CCE). Students in the CCE also organized the first collegiate Jump Rope for Heart events in the United States.

== Wesleyan traditions ==
=== Athletics ===
The college currently sponsors 21 sports, competing in NCAA Division II. The Bobcats compete as members of the Mountain East Conference for all twenty-one varsity teams. The college offers varsity men's sports in baseball, basketball, cross country, football, golf, soccer, swimming, tennis, indoor track and field and outdoor track and field. The college offers varsity women's sports in basketball, cross country, golf, lacrosse, soccer, softball, swimming, tennis, indoor track and field, outdoor track and field and volleyball. The 21st varsity sport, women's lacrosse, formally began competition in the fall of 2010.

=== Wesley Chapel ===
With the ability to seat 1,800 people, Wesley Chapel annually hosts the West Virginia United Methodist Annual Conference each June.

== Notable alumni ==
- Maggie Anderson (born 1948), poet
- Ken Ash (1901–1979), baseball player
- Chalmers Ault (1900–1979), football player
- William E. Baker (1873–1954), judge
- Pamela Balch, president emerita of West Virginia Wesleyan College
- Len Barnum (1912–1998), football player
- Cliff Battles (1910–1981), football player
- Thomas Bickerton (born 1958), bishop
- Sheriff Blake (1899–1982), baseball player
- Shannon Breen (born 1989), football player
- Jim Brogan (born 1958), basketball player
- Lewis C. Cantley (born 1949), cell biologist
- Ted Cassidy (1932–1979), actor
- Robin Davis (born 1956), jurist
- Ray Dorr (1941–2001), football player
- William Flanagan (1901–1975), football player
- Matt Foreman, activist
- Denise Giardina (born 1951), novelist
- L. J. Hanifan (1879–1932), economist
- Charles Hoyes, actor
- John Kellison (1886–1971), football player
- Jason Koon (born 1985), poker player
- Oscar Lambert (1890–1970), athlete
- Jean Lee Latham (1902–1995), writer
- Blanche Lazzell (1878–1956), painter
- Bil Lepp, TV host
- Carl Martin, member of the West Virginia House of Delegates
- John F. McCuskey (born 1947), justice of the Supreme Court of Appeals of West Virginia
- Irene McKinney (1939–2012), poet
- Jim Miller (1908–1965), football player
- Scott Douglas Miller, president of Virginia Wesleyan University
- Ken Moore (1917–2003), American football player, New York Giants
- Robbie Morris, West Virginia Senate, from the 11th district
- Greasy Neale (1891–1973), football player
- Daniel Pitt O'Brien (1900–1957), politician
- Roy Earl Parrish (1888–1918), politician
- Okey L. Patteson (1898–1989), politician
- Anthony Peters (born 1983), soccer player
- Nelson Peterson (1913–1990), football player
- Edward G. Rohrbough (1874–1956), politician
- Harry Shriver (1896–1970), baseball player
- Stephen Skinner, politician
- Margaret Smith (born 1952), politician
- David E. Stuart, anthropologist
- Chalmers Tschappat (1896–1958), football player
- Peter D. Weaver (born 1945), bishop
- Lillian Mayfield Wright (1894–1986), poet
