= Jennifer Balch =

American scientist

- Education: B.A. - 1999 Princeton M.S. - 2004 Yale Ph.D. - 2008 Yale
- Awards: ESA Early Career Fellow (2016-2020)
- Scientific career
- Workplaces: Pennsylvania State University: 2012-2014; University of Colorado Boulder: 2014-present

Jennifer K. Balch is an American scientist best known for her work involving the Earth Lab Project at University of Colorado Boulder, primarily researches the relationship between fire and the Amazon. She specializes in research involving temperate and tropical ecosystems.

== Education and career ==
Balch discovered her interest in ecology and fire science during her undergraduate education. She graduated from Princeton with her B.A. geography in 1999. She then began her graduate work at Yale, where she graduated in 2004 and 2008 with her M.S. and Ph.D. respectively. Both of her graduate degrees revolve around geography and forest ecology.

Balch was previously an associate professor of geography at Pennsylvania State University from 2012–2014, before accepting her current position. She is a fellow of the Cooperative Institute for Research in Environmental Sciences (CIRES) and tenured faculty director and Professor of Geography in the College of Arts and Sciences at the University of Colorado Boulder. While an assistant professor in Boulder, she created and directed the Earth Lab project. At Earth Lab, data is compiled and interpreted in reference to ecosystems where fire seems imminent. This data is then utilized in several different ways: to publish papers, provide education about climate change, foster relationships with public and private sectors, and eventually train capable scientists. She works with several other climate scientists, such as William Travis, to guide the faculty and staff in their research. In addition to her work in ecology, Balch is the principal investigator for the National Science Foundation (NSF) NEON Science Summit, which gives grants to qualified individuals in the field of macrosystem biology. The grant is funded by the University of Colorado, and has provided $99,957 of aid to date.

Balch is a leading researcher on fire ecology of the Amazon. She has authored papers such as The Susceptibility of Southeastern Amazon Forests to Fire: Insights from a Large-Scale Burn Experiment and Pattern and process: Fire-initiated grass invasion at Amazon transitional forest edges, and has been interviewed for popular press articles by The New York Times, CPR News, and the Daily Camera. In her 2017 compilation of data, Balch discovered that human-caused wildfires accounted for 84% of recorded fires in the United States. These wildfires were found to not only effect ecosystems but also our own economy as well. Fire management and performance-based prevention is expensive, which could potentially cause a shift in resource allocation within Brazil.

== Achievements and honors ==
Balch was named an Ecological Society of America (ESA) Early Career Fellow (2016-2020) for her work in fire risk, prevention, and ramifications of wildfires in temperate and tropical ecosystems.

In 2017, Balch, Bethany A. Bradley, John T. Abatzoglou, Chelsea Nagy, Emily J. Fuscod, and Adam L. Mahood published a paper which examined humans' role in the recent increase in wildfires in the past few decades. Wildfires are now being set during all seasons and in places where fire is not naturally occurring. The result of this paper found that wildfires are the consequence of lightning (16%) and humans (84%).

Later in 2017, Balch brought together some of the top scientists in the fields of geography, fire ecology, and data analysis to compile extensive amounts of data to make climate models. With these people, she created the Earth Lab project at the University of Colorado, Boulder.

Balch became a member of the American Geophysical Union in 2019 and was elected a fellow in 2025.

== Selected publications ==
- Human-started wildfires expand the fire niche across the United States, Balch et al. 2017, PNAS
- Adapt to more wildfire in western North American forests as climate changes, Schoennagel et al. 2017, PNAS
- Pattern and process: Fire-initiated grass invasion at Amazon transitional forest edges, Balch, Nepstad, & Curran 2009
- Recognizing Women Leaders in Fire Science, Smith et al. 2018
- The Susceptibility of Southeastern Amazon Forests to Fire: Insights from a Large-Scale Burn Experiment, Balch et al. 2015
