= Bill Flanagan (disambiguation) =

Bill Flanagan (born 1955) is an American author, television executive and radio host.

Bill Flanagan may also refer to:

- Bill Flanagan (academic), Canadian academic
- Bill Flanagan (rugby league), Australian rugby league player
- Bill Flanagan (American football) (1901–1935), American football player

== See also ==
- William Flanagan (disambiguation)
