= David E. Stuart =

American novelist

David E. Stuart is an American anthropologist, and novelist, and Associate Provost Emeritus at University of New Mexico.

He graduated from West Virginia Wesleyan College, with a BA in Anthropology and Sociology in 1967, and from University of New Mexico with an MA in 1970 and PhD in 1972 in Anthropology.

He has conducted fieldwork in Alaska, Ecuador, Mexico, and the Southwest. He teaches at University of New Mexico. He is a Guggenheim Fellow.

== Works ==
- The magic of Bandelier, Ancient City Press, 1989, ISBN 978-0-941270-56-4
- Anasazi America. UNM Press. 2000. ISBN 978-0-8263-2179-4.
- John Martin Campbell; Thomas C. Windes; David E. Stuart; Katherine Kallestad (2007). "Chacoan Great House Society". The great houses of Chaco. UNM Press. ISBN 978-0-8263-4248-5.
- The Morganza, 1967: life in a legendary reform school, University of New Mexico Press, 2009, ISBN 978-0-8263-4641-4

=== Novels ===
- The Guaymas Chronicles. UNM Press. 2003. ISBN 978-0-8263-3188-5.
- The Guaymas chronicles: Zone of tolerance. UNM Press. 2005. ISBN 978-0-8263-3828-0.
- The Ecuador Effect. UNM Press. 2007. ISBN 978-0-8263-4099-3.
- Flight of Souls. UNM Press. 2008. ISBN 978-0-8263-4262-1.
- Angel of Vilcabamba, University of New Mexico Press, 2009, ISBN 978-0-8263-4498-4
