= Chalmer Ault =

American football player (1900–1979)

Profile
- Positions: Tackle, guard

Personal information
- Born: July 10, 1900; Jacobsburg, Ohio, U.S.
- Died: May 18, 1979 (aged 78); Buckhannon, West Virginia, U.S.
- Listed height: 5 ft 9 in (1.75 m)
- Listed weight: 195 lb (88 kg)

Career information
- High school: Moundsville
- College: West Virginia Wesleyan

Career history
- Cleveland Bulldogs (1924–1925)

Career statistics
- Games: 3
- Stats at Pro Football Reference

Chalmer Augustus Ault (July 10, 1900 – May 18, 1979) was an American professional football player who was a tackle and guard in the National Football League (NFL) for the Cleveland Bulldogs. Prior to his professional career, Ault played college football for the West Virginia Wesleyan Bobcats.
