= Tania Schoennagel =

Ecologist

- Education: Dartmouth College (B.A. in History, 1990) The University of Wisconsin-Madison (M.S. in Geography, 1995, M.S. in Conservation Biology, 1997, Ph.D. in Ecology, 2002)
- Website: https://spot.colorado.edu/~schoenna/

Tania Schoennagel is an ecologist who specializes in wildfires and insect outbreaks. She is a research scientist at the University of Colorado, Boulder and has been involved with INSTAAR (Institute of Arctic and Alpine Research) since 2011.

== Early life and education ==
Schoennagel was raised in New Jersey.

She earned a degree in history from Dartmouth College in 1990. In 1995 she earned a master's degree in geography, a second master's degree in conservation biology in 1997, and a Ph.D. in ecology in 2002, all from the University of Wisconsin–Madison, under the direction of Monica Turner.

== Career ==
In 2003, just after earning her Ph.D. from the University of Wisconsin-Madison, Schoennagel was given a fellowship through the National Science Foundation.

In 2006, she received the David H. Smith Conservation Research Fellowship through the Society for Conservation Biology and the Cedar Tree Foundation.

Schoennagel now works as a research scientist at the University of Colorado, Boulder where she has been since 2003. In 2011, Schoennagel began her position as research scientist of INSTAAR, where she continues to work. Schoennagel's research is focussed primarily on wildfires and insect outbreaks. While she conducts her studies around answering fundamental ecological questions, her research correlates to forest management, land-use policy, and climate change.

== Publications ==
- Tania Schoennagel, Thomas T. Veblen, William H. Romme, “The Interaction of Fire, Fuels, and Climate across Rocky Mountain Forests," Bioscience 2004 Jul 1;54(7):661-76. According to Google Scholar, this article has been cited 896 times
- Moritz MA, Batllori E, Bradstock RA, Gill AM, Handmer J, Hessburg PF, Leonard J, McCaffrey S, Odion DC, Schoennagel T, Syphard AD. Learning to coexist with wildfire. Nature. 2014 Nov;515(7525):58-66. According to Google Scholar, this article has been cited 519 times
- Tania Schoennagel, Jennifer K. Balch, Hannah Brenkert-Smith, Philip E. Dennison, Brian J. Harvey, Meg A. Krawchuk, Nathan Mietkiewicz, Penelope Morgan, Max A. Moritz, Ray Rasker, Monica G. Turner, Cathy Whitlock, (2017) “Adapt to More Wildlife in Western North American Forests as Climate Changes,” Proceedings of the National Academy of Sciences May 2;114(18):4582-90. According to Google Scholar, this article has been cited 287 times
- Tania Schoennagel, Thomas T. Veblen, W. H. Romme, J. S. Sibold, E. R. Cook, "ENSO and PDO Variability Affect Drought- Induced Fire Occurrence in Rocky Mountain Subalpine Forests," Ecological Applications 2005 Dec;15(6):2000-14.
- National Fire Plan Treatments Near the Wildland-Urban Interface in the Western United States, Proceedings of the National Academy of Sciences 2009 Jun 30;106(26):10706-11. According to Google Scholar, this article has been cited 146 times
