= Pamela Balch =

American academic administrator

Pamela Jubin Balch

18th President of West Virginia Wesleyan College
- In office 2006 – Dec 2016
- Preceded by: William R. Haden

Personal details
- Born: Uniontown, Pennsylvania
- Spouse: Patrick Balch
- Education: West Virginia Wesleyan

Pamela Balch is the 18th president of West Virginia Wesleyan College in Buckhannon, West Virginia. Balch is a 1971 graduate of West Virginia Wesleyan College, and was the unanimous choice as the eighteenth president of the college by the board of trustees.

Balch has spent 28 years in higher education and came to Wesleyan after serving as president of Mayville State University, North Dakota. Prior to Mayville, the Uniontown, Pennsylvania, native was the Vice President for Academic Affairs and Dean of the Faculty at Bethany College in West Virginia, Vice Provost for Academic Planning at California State University, Chico, and Associate Dean for Academic Affairs at San Diego State University, Imperial Valley Campus.

She served as the director of Wesleyan's graduate programs in education from 1985 to 1988 and was a member of the education faculty at the college from 1978 to 1988. Her professional career began as a public school teacher in West Virginia.
