= William Flanagan (American football) =

American football player (1901–1975)

No. 8, 40
- Position: Tailback / Wingback

Personal information
- Born: April 27, 1901; Buckhannon, West Virginia, U.S.
- Died: February 4, 1975; Martinsburg, West Virginia, U.S.
- Listed height: 6 ft 0 in (1.83 m)
- Listed weight: 169 lb (77 kg)

Career information
- High school: Buckhannon (WV)
- College: Pittsburgh, West Virginia Wesleyan

Career history
- Pottsville Maroons (1925–1926)
- Stats at Pro Football Reference

William Harold "Hoot" Flanagan (April 27, 1901 – February 4, 1975 ) was a professional football player from Buckhannon, West Virginia who played during the early years of the National Football League (NFL) with the Pottsville Maroons from 1925 through 1926. Flanagan attended the University of Pittsburgh and West Virginia Wesleyan College. Flanagan made his NFL debut in 1925 with the Pottsville Maroons where he helped the team win the NFL Championship, before it was stripped from the team due to a disputed rules violation. He played in Pottsville for his entire 2-year career.
